= National Register of Historic Places listings in eastern Puerto Rico =

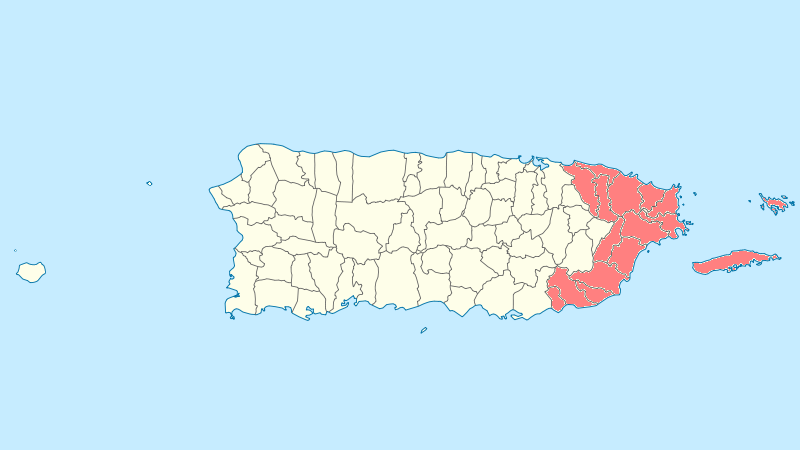
National Register entries listed below are found in the highlighted 16 municipalities of Puerto Rico.

This portion of National Register of Historic Places listings in Puerto Rico covers the eastern region of Puerto Rico, from Carolina in the northeast to Arroyo in the southeast. It also includes the islands of Culebra and Vieques.

Names of places given are as appear in the National Register, reflecting name as given in NRHP application at the date of listing. Note, the National Register name system does not accommodate Spanish á, ñ and other letters.

This National Park Service list is complete through NPS recent listings posted August 28, 2026.

== Arroyo ==
	Name on the Register	Image	Date listed	Location	Barrio	Description
1	Faro de Punta de las Figuras	Faro de Punta de las Figuras	October 22, 1981 (#81000687)	Punta de las Figuras, southeast of Arroyo Pueblo; 17°57′18″N 66°02′52″W	Palmas	Spanish-built Neoclassical lighthouse from 1893, operated by the U.S. Army during the Second World War.

== Canóvanas ==
	Name on the Register	Image	Date listed	Location	Barrio	Description
1	Villarán Bridge	Villarán Bridge	July 19, 1995 (#95000835)	Highway 9959, km 3, spanning Río Canóvanas; 18°22′45″N 65°53′32″W	Canóvanas Pueblo and Canóvanas	Built in 1892 on the 19th century highway between Río Piedras and Río Grande, this iron and masonry bridge is the best preserved example of an Eiffel pony truss bridge in Puerto Rico or the United States. By 1994, it had been replaced by an adjacent span for vehicular use, but it remained open for pedestrian use.

== Carolina ==
	Name on the Register	Image	Date listed	Location	Barrio	Description
1	Church San Fernando of Carolina	Church San Fernando of Carolina	September 18, 1984 (#84003160)	Muñoz Rivera St., Town Plaza; 18°22′52″N 65°57′23″W	Carolina Pueblo	One of the two churches designed by state engineer Antonio Maria de Vizcarrondo y Guitian. Built between 1860 and 1862.
2	Edificio Alcaldia	Edificio Alcaldia	December 28, 1983 (#83004197)	Sánchez Osorio St. at José de Diego St. 18°22′53″N 65°57′27″W	Carolina Pueblo	Former city hall built between 1927 and 1930, designed by Rafael Carmoega in a Spanish Colonial Revival style.
3	Quebrada Maracuto		August 27, 2004 (#04000909)	Address restricted	Cacao and Santa Cruz	Pre-Columbian site with petroglyphs found across seven boulders in Maracuto Creek. Part of the Prehistoric Rock Art of Puerto Rico MPS.

== Ceiba ==
	Name on the Register	Image	Date listed	Location	Barrio	Description
1	Ceiba Fire Station		February 13, 2013 (#13000012)	226 Lauro Piñero Avenue; 18°15′59″N 65°38′52″W	Ceiba Pueblo	Art Deco fire station from 1954, designed and built by the Department Public Works of Puerto Rico. Part of the Fire Stations in Puerto Rico MPS.

== Culebra ==
	Name on the Register	Image	Date listed	Location	Barrio	Description
1	Faro Isla de Culebritas	Faro Isla de Culebritas	October 22, 1981 (#81000686)	Isla Culebrita; 18°18′49″N 65°13′39″W	Fraile	Spanish-built lighthouse from 1882, it used to aid in the navigation through the Virgin Passage and the Vieques Sound. Located in the island of Culebrita, part of the Culebra National Wildlife Refuge.

== Fajardo ==
	Name on the Register	Image	Date listed	Location	Barrio	Description
1	Church Santiago Apóstol of Fajardo	Church Santiago Apóstol of Fajardo	September 18, 1984 (#84003144)	Town Plaza; 18°19′30″N 65°39′11″W	Fajardo Pueblo	A former parish church (now cathedral) from 1776. Part of the Historic Churches of Puerto Rico TR.
2	Faro de las Cabezas de San Juan	Faro de las Cabezas de San Juan	October 22, 1981 (#81000692)	Northeast of Soroco; 18°22′53″N 65°37′05″W	Cabezas	Spanish-built lighthouse from 1880, it played an important role in the Puerto Rico campaign of the Spanish–American War. Located in the Las Cabezas de San Juan Nature Reserve.
3	U.S. Custom House	U.S. Custom House	February 10, 1988 (#88000077)	Union Street; 18°20′02″N 65°37′50″W	Playa Puerto Real	Customs house from 1930, designed by Albert B. Nichols. Also served as a U.S. Post Office throughout its life. Part of the United States Custom Houses in Puerto Rico MPS.

== Humacao ==
	Name on the Register	Image	Date listed	Location	Barrio	Description
1	Casa Roig	Casa Roig	November 17, 1977 (#77001550)	66 Antonio López Street; 18°08′53″N 65°49′30″W	Humacao Pueblo	A Prairie School building from 1920, designed by Antonin Nechodoma for prominent sugarcane magnate Antonio Roig. Now a Historic house museum operated by the University of Puerto Rico at Humacao.
2	Church Dulce Nombre de Jesús of Humacao	Church Dulce Nombre de Jesús of Humacao	September 18, 1984 (#84003140)	Town Plaza; 18°09′01″N 65°49′34″W	Humacao Pueblo	Late Gothic Revival cathedral church from 1869. Part of the Historic Churches of Puerto Rico TR.
3	Guzmán Family Pantheon	Guzmán Family Pantheon	April 17, 1995 (#95000436)	Junction of Padre Rivera and Miguel Casillas Streets; 18°09′08″N 65°49′40″W	Humacao Pueblo	Eclectic style mausoleum and funerary chapel from 1864. Also known as the Guzmán Hermitage.
4	Humacao Customs House	Humacao Customs House	May 18, 1995 (#95000599)	Junction of Marina and Aduana Streets; 18°09′54″N 65°44′38″W	Punta Santiago	Spanish Colonial building built by the Department of Public Works of the Spanish Government in Puerto Rico in 1872, designed by Julian Cruellas y Rovira to be the Humacao customs house at its port in Punta Santiago.
5	Humacao District Courthouse	Humacao District Courthouse	May 18, 1995 (#95000596)	Junction of Dr. Vidal and Antonio López Streets; 18°08′58″N 65°49′27″W	Humacao Pueblo	Classical Revival Federal-style courthouse from 1925 designed by Rafael Carmoega. Also served as a city hall, reception venue and currently a local fine arts museum.
6	Palmira López de Pereyó House	Palmira López de Pereyó House	April 14, 1995 (#95000435)	Junction of Font Martelo and Minerva Streets; 18°09′02″N 65°49′20″W	Humacao Pueblo	Prairie School house from 1930 designed by Francisco Valinés Cofresí for Luis Pereyó y Rodríguez, former District judge from Humacao.
7	Antonia Sáez School		May 18, 1995 (#95000597)	Junction of Font Martelo and Isidro Ortiz Streets; 18°09′06″N 65°49′49″W	Humacao Pueblo	A Mission/Spanish Revival school from 1922. It also served as a public marketplace between 1966 and 2004.

== Las Piedras ==
	Name on the Register	Image	Date listed	Location	Barrio	Description
1	Cueva del Indio		September 4, 2003 (#03000884)	Approximately 1.2 km (0.75 mi) north of Highway 198; 18°11′50″N 65°52′24″W	Quebrada Arenas	Site of a former ceremonial ball court (batey) and containing examples of indigenous rock art found throughout large batholitic boulders. Part of the Prehistoric Rock Art of Puerto Rico MPS.

== Loíza ==
	Name on the Register	Image	Date listed	Location	Barrio	Description
1	Roberto Clemente Walker Crash Site		August 31, 2022 (#100008070)	PR 187 km. 6, Punta Maldonado and 1.5 nautical mi. offshore in the Atlantic Ocean; 18°27′45″N 65°57′30″W	Loíza vicinity	Site of the 1972 Puerto Rico DC-7 crash caused by a failed engine, where baseball legend Roberto Clemente died.
2	Cueva de Los Indios		June 24, 1982 (#82003823)	Address restricted	Torrecilla Baja	Well-preserved small cave with indigenous petroglyphs. Also known as the Cueva Punta Maldonado site, within the management boundaries of Piñones State Forest. Part of the Part of the Prehistoric Rock Art of Puerto Rico MPS.
3	Parroquia del Espiritu Santo y San Patricio (Note: The name of the Parroquia del Espiritu Santo y San Patricio is presented here without the accent on "Espíritu" in conformance with the usage in the church's National Register nomination form and Federal Register announcement of listing.)	Parroquia del Espiritu Santo y San Patricio	September 8, 1976 (#76002251)	Plaza de Loíza; 18°26′00″N 65°52′47″W	Loíza Pueblo	Historic parish church dating from 1729, representative of the local Afro-Puerto Rican heritage.

== Luquillo ==
	Name on the Register	Image	Date listed	Location	Barrio	Description
1	Williams Products Corporation	Williams Products Corporation	November 14, 2012 (#12000938)	Highway 992, km 0.3; 18°22′16″N 65°43′07″W	Mata de Plátano	Historic factory building from 1957 designed in the Modernist style. Also known as La Williams Factory.

== Maunabo ==
	Name on the Register	Image	Date listed	Location	Barrio	Description
1	Casa Alcaldia de Maunabo	Casa Alcaldia de Maunabo	August 23, 2022 (#100008050)	Calle Santiago Iglesias #8; 18°00′25″N 65°53′59″W	Maunabo Pueblo	Historic city hall building from the early 20th century.
2	Faro de Punta de la Tuna	Faro de Punta de la Tuna	October 22, 1981 (#81000688)	Southeast of Puerto Maunabo; 17°59′18″N 65°53′07″W	Emajagua	Historic Neoclassical lighthouse from 1892. Part of the Lighthouse System of Puerto Rico TR.

== Naguabo ==
	Name on the Register	Image	Date listed	Location	Barrio	Description
1	Bridge No. 122	Bridge No. 122	July 19, 1995 (#95000836)	Highway 3, km 9, spanning the Santiago River; 18°11′18″N 65°43′30″W	Río and Húcares	Historic reinforced concrete bridge designed by Félix Benítez Rexach spanning the Santiago River notable for its ornamental details.
2	Church Nuestra Señora del Rosario of Naguabo	Church Nuestra Señora del Rosario of Naguabo	December 10, 1984 (#84000456)	Town Plaza; 18°12′43″N 65°44′09″W	Naguabo Pueblo	One of the oldest structures in the town of Naguabo, built in 1856 in a Spanish Colonial style with Eclectic ornamentations being added at the beginning of the 20th-century.
3	Icacos Petroglyph Group	Icacos Petroglyph Group	December 1, 2015 (#15000855)	Address restricted	Address restricted	Ensemble of Taino petroglyphs found across several large boulders at the confluence of the Icacos and Cubuy Rivers in El Toro Wilderness of El Yunque National Forest. Also known as the Río Blanco Petroglyphs site.
4	Villa Del Mar	Villa Del Mar	June 23, 1983 (#83002293)	Highway 3, km 66.2; 18°11′21″N 65°42′54″W	Húcares	Now ruined 1917 Queen Anne-inspired Criollo-style residence formerly owned by a wealthy sugarcane plantation owner also known as "El Castillo" located in the Malecón of Naguabo.

== Patillas ==
	Name on the Register	Image	Date listed	Location	Barrio	Description
1	María Dávila Semidey School	María Dávila Semidey School	November 14, 2012 (#12000939)	300 Muñoz Rivera Street; 18°00′21″N 66°01′01″W	Patillas Pueblo	Mission Revival-style school building from 1925, designed by Francisco Gardón Vega.

== Río Grande ==
	Name on the Register	Image	Date listed	Location	Barrio	Description
1	Baño de Oro	Baño de Oro	January 21, 2020 (#100004891)	Highway 191, km 12.1; 18°18′02″N 65°47′12″W	Mameyes II	Historic Civilian Conservation Corps-built visitor infrastructure named after the natural area of the same name in El Yunque National Forest.
2	Baño Grande	Baño Grande	February 28, 2017 (#100000685)	Highway 191, km 11.85; 18°18′06″N 65°47′07″W	Mameyes II	Former swimming pool built by the Civilian Conservation Corps by damming a section of La Mina River in El Yunque National Forest. Also known as La Mina Pool.
3	Jimenez Petroglyph Site		May 28, 2024 (#100008398)	Address Restricted	Río Grande vicinity	Ancient Taino petroglyph site with rock art uniquely carved onto red clay, located in El Yunque National Forest.
4	Mt. Britton Tower	Mt. Britton Tower	May 30, 2024 (#100010421)	181 metres (594 ft) southeast of FS Road 10 at km. 1.3; 18°18′04″N 65°47′36″W	Río Grande vicinity	Civilian Conservation Corps tower located in the summit of Mount Britton, the 8th tallest peak in El Yunque National Forest. Built in the 1930s.
5	Río Grande Fire Station		January 29, 2013 (#12001248)	6 Juan R. González Street; 18°22′46″N 65°49′49″W	Río Grande Pueblo	Historic Art Deco firehouse built in 1951 by the Department of Public Works of Puerto Rico. Part of the Fire Stations in Puerto Rico MPS.

== Vieques ==
	Name on the Register	Image	Date listed	Location	Barrio	Description
1	Rafael Acevedo House		March 17, 1994 (#94000249)	Víctor Duteil Street between San José and Baldorioty Streets; 18°09′00″N 65°26′35″W	Isabel Segunda	Historic house built in a Neoclassical Vieques Creole-style in 1900, representative of architectural influences from the British and French West Indies. Also known as the Mirella Acevedo Sanes House.
2	Algodones 2 (12VPr2-204)		August 21, 1991 (#91001037)	Address restricted	Puerto Diablo	An archeological site of an indigenous village with evidence of inhabitation throughout different cultural periods since 600 CE. Located in the former Vieques Naval Reservation.
3	Algodones 3 (12VPr2-205)		August 21, 1991 (#91001038)	Address restricted	Puerto Diablo	Another village archeological site, found within the borders of the Vieques National Wildlife Refuge.
4	Algodones 6 (12VPr2-229)		August 21, 1991 (#91001032)	Address restricted	Puerto Diablo	Another village archeological site, found within the borders of the Vieques National Wildlife Refuge.
5	Camp Garcia (Campo Asilo) 3 (12VPr2-164)		August 21, 1991 (#91001041)	Address restricted	Puerto Ferro	Site of petroglyphs, also found within the borders of the Vieques National Wildlife Refuge.
6	Casa Alcaldía de Vieques	Casa Alcaldía de Vieques	March 17, 1994 (#94000174)	Junction of Carlos LeBrun and Benítez Guzmán Streets; 18°08′59″N 65°26′30″W	Isabel Segunda	Former "casa del rey" founded in 1850 in the settlement of Isabel Segunda to re-establish Spanish colonial control of the island of Vieques. Today it serves as the municipal city hall.
7	Casa Augusto Delerme		February 2, 1994 (#93001555)	7 Benítez Guzmán Street; 18°09′00″N 65°26′31″W	Isabel Segunda	A 4-Room Vieques Creole vernacular-style house built in 1850 for a local prominent French-born landowner.
8	Casa Delerme-Anduze No. 2		November 22, 1993 (#93001205)	355 Antonio Mellado Street; 18°08′55″N 65°26′29″W	Isabel Segunda	A six-room Vieques Creole vernacular-style house from 1876 owned by a wealthy landowner from Guadeloupe.
9	Casa de Jaime Puig Lemoine		April 14, 1994 (#94000363)	161 65 de Infantería Street; 18°08′55″N 65°26′35″W	Isabel Segunda	Bungalow/Craftsman house from 1930, designed by Jaime Puig.
10	Central Playa Grande	Central Playa Grande	September 10, 1992 (#92001236)	Address restricted	Llave	An archaeological site consisting of a former sugarcane plantation and mill with architecture by Matias Hjardemaal and others.
11	Delerme-Anduze House		February 2, 1994 (#93001556)	361 Antonio Mellado Street; 18°08′55″N 65°26′29″W	Isabel Segunda	A vernacular French Caribbean Creole-style gallery house from 1850.
12	Faro de Vieques	Faro de Vieques	November 17, 1977 (#77001551)	Punta Mulas; 18°09′16″N 65°26′38″W	Puerto Diablo	Spanish-built lighthouse from 1896. Now also houses a maritime history museum.
13	Fuerte de Vieques	Fuerte de Vieques	November 18, 1977 (#77001552)	Calle del Fuerte; 18°08′51″N 65°26′21″W	Isabel Segunda	Well-preserved Spanish-built fortress from 1845 established to provide protection to Isabel Segunda and its harbor. Now it also houses the Vieques Museum of Art and History.
14	Hacienda Casa del Francés	Hacienda Casa del Francés	November 18, 1977 (#77001548)	Near Esperanza; 18°06′09″N 65°28′15″W	Puerto Real	Historic residence and plantation manor of Henri Muraille from 1910. Also known as the Sportsmen's House. Destroyed by fire in 2005.
15	Laguna Jalova Archeological District		September 10, 1992 (#92001237)	Address restricted	Puerto Diablo	Archaeological district consisting of different pre-Columbian village sites. Also known as "Western Friendly Front Line".
16	Llave 13 (12VPr2-175)		August 21, 1991 (#91001036)	Address restricted	Llave	Pre-Columbian archaeological site.
17	Loma Jalova 3 (12VPr2-219)		August 21, 1991 (#91001034)	Address restricted	Puerto Diablo	Pre-Columbian archaeological site.
18	Monte Largo 2 (12VPr2-172)		August 21, 1991 (#91001042)	Address restricted	Puerto Diablo	Pre-Columbian archaeological site.
19	Paramayon 2		September 10, 1992 (#92001241)	Address restricted	Llave	Pre-Columbian archaeological site.
20	Le Pistolet (12VPr2-168)		August 22, 1991 (#91001040)	Address restricted	Punta Arenas	Pre-Columbian archaeological site.
21	Playa Grande 9 (12VPr2-212)		August 21, 1991 (#91001035)	Address restricted	Llave	Pre-Columbian archaeological site.
22	Playa Vieja		September 10, 1992 (#92001235)	Address restricted	Punta Arenas	Archaeological evidence of prehistoric human inhabitation, particularly from the Saladoid and Ostionoid cultures. Also known as Site 12VPr2-70.
23	Punta Jalova		September 10, 1992 (#92001239)	Address restricted	Puerto Diablo	Pre-Columbian archaeological site.
24	Resolucion Historic District (Note: The name of the Resolucion Historic District is presented here without the accent on "Resolución" in conformance with the usage in the site's National Register nomination form and announcement of listing.)		September 10, 1992 (#92001242)	Address restricted	Punta Arenas	Industrial archaeological site of the first sugarcane plantations and mills established in the island of Vieques and designed by T. J. J. M. Le Guillou and others.
25	Smaine–Ortiz House		February 2, 1994 (#93001554)	341 Antonio Mellado Street; 18°08′49″N 65°26′29″W	Isabel Segunda	Vieques Creole vernacular residence. Also known as the Porfirio Ortiz House.
26	Las Tumbas de J. J. María le Guillou		August 26, 1994 (#94000923)	Highway 200, near Isabel Segunda; 18°09′10″N 65°25′57″W	Puerto Diablo	Graveyard from 1843 built in a Classical Revival style for the Le Guillou family, who founded the modern municipality of Vieques and established its first modern sugarcane plantations.
27	Ventana Archeological District		September 10, 1992 (#92001238)	Address restricted	Llave	Pre-Columbian archaeological site.
28	Ventana 4 (12VPr2-171)		August 21, 1991 (#91001039)	Address restricted	Punta Arenas	Pre-Columbian archaeological site.
29	Vieques Pharmacy	Vieques Pharmacy	March 2, 1994 (#94000061)	Junction of Carlos LeBrun and Víctor Duteil Streets; 18°08′58″N 65°26′30″W	Isabel Segunda	Former town general store, pharmacy, post office and customs house, established by the vice-consul of Denmark in Vieques to tighten the ties between the Spanish and Danish Virgin Islands. Today a restaurant.
30	Yanuel 8 (12VPr2-173)		August 21, 1991 (#91001043)	Address restricted	Puerto Diablo	Pre-Columbian archaeological site.
31	Yanuel 9 (12VPr2-220)		August 21, 1991 (#91001033)	Address restricted	Puerto Diablo	Pre-Columbian archaeological site.

== Yabucoa ==
	Name on the Register	Image	Date listed	Location	Barrio	Description
1	Yabucoa Fire Station	Yabucoa Fire Station	February 13, 2013 (#13000015)	22 Luis Muñoz Rivera Street; 18°03′07″N 65°52′38″W	Yabucoa Pueblo	Historic Art Deco fire station from 1943. Also known as the Parque de Bombas de Yabucoa.

== See also ==
- National Register of Historic Places listings in Puerto Rico
- National Register of Historic Places listings in southern Puerto Rico
- National Register of Historic Places listings in northern Puerto Rico
- National Register of Historic Places listings in western Puerto Rico
- National Register of Historic Places listings in central Puerto Rico
- National Register of Historic Places listings in San Juan, Puerto Rico
- History of Puerto Rico
