= Las Tumbas de J. J. María le Guillou =

Historic graveyard in Vieques, Puerto Rico

- Las Tumbas de J. J. Maria le Guillou
- U.S. National Register of Historic Places
- Puerto Rico Historic Sites and Zones
- Location within Puerto Rico
- Location: Highway 200, near Isabel Segunda, Vieques, Puerto Rico
- Coordinates: 18°09′10″N 65°25′57″W
- Built: 1843
- Architectural style: Classical Revival
- NRHP reference No.: 94000923
- RNSZH No.: 2000-(RE)-18-JP-SH

Significant dates
- Added to NRHP: August 26, 1994
- Designated RNSZH: May 16, 2001

The J. J. María le Guillou Tombs (Spanish: Tumbas de J. J. María le Guillou), better known as the Guillou Tombs (Tumbas Guillou), refers to a historic graveyard consisting of six tombs belonging to the Le Guillou family, the founders of Isabel Segunda, the main town in the island-municipality of Vieques, Puerto Rico. The site, listed in the National Register of Historic Places in 1994 and on the Puerto Rico Register of Historic Sites and Zones in 2001, can be found in what is today the Puerto Diablo barrio, just outside of the town of Isabel Segunda. This is the site of a former sugarcane plantation, Hacienda La Pacience, the first of its kind to be established in the island of Vieques. It was established by Teófilo José Jaime María Le Guillou, a Spanish-naturalized French immigrant from Quimperlé, Brittany who is considered the founder of the modern municipality of Vieques. The site today consists of six individual tombs that were built between 1843 and 1855 in a Neoclassical style for the members of the Le Guillou family.

== See also ==
- French immigration to Puerto Rico
- National Register of Historic Places listings in eastern Puerto Rico
