= Casa Alcaldía de Vieques =

Historic civic building in Puerto Rico

- U.S. National Register of Historic Places
- Puerto Rico Historic Sites and Zones
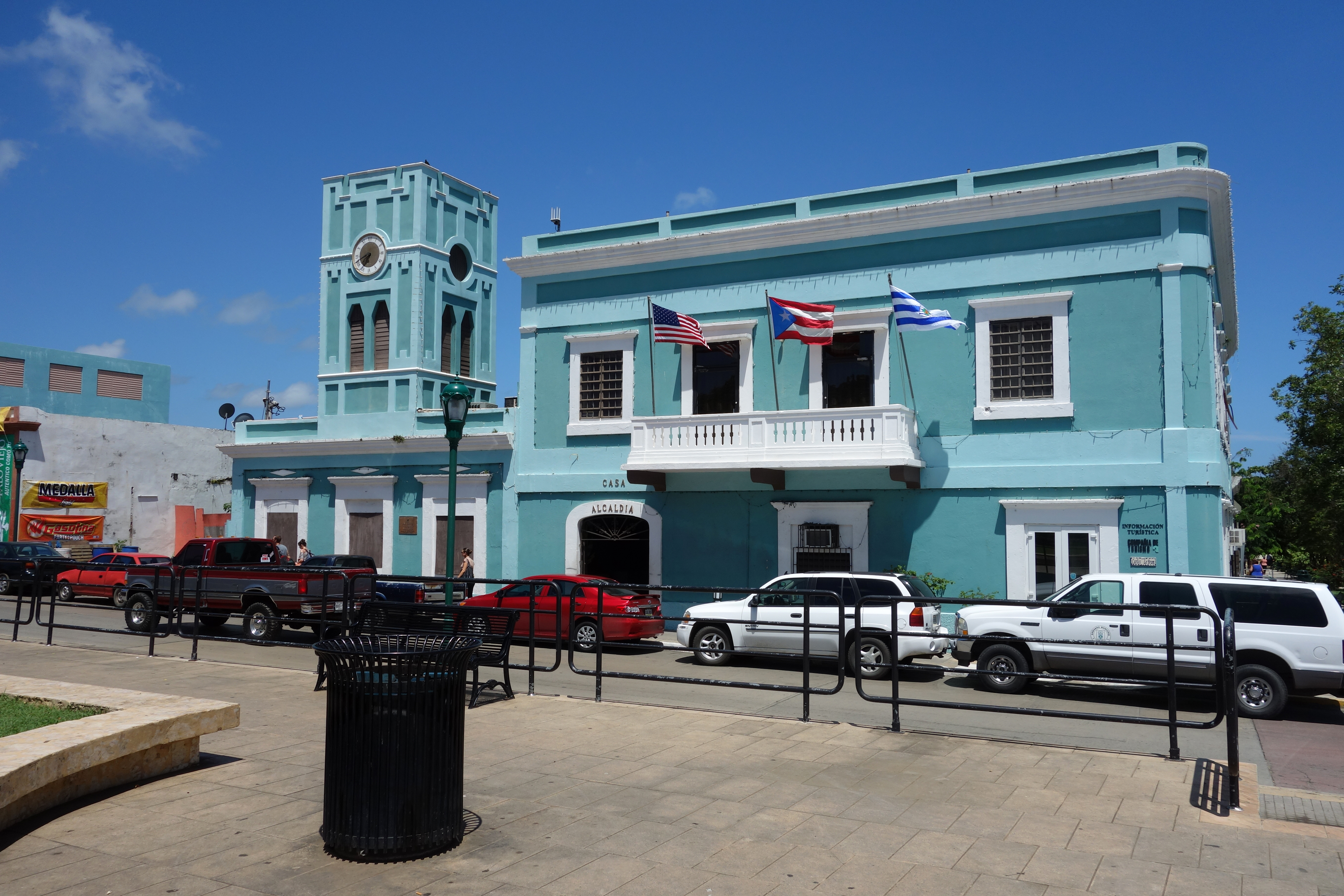
- Vieques City Hall in 2013

- Location within Puerto Rico
- Location: Junction of Carlos LeBrun and Benítez Guzmán Streets Isabel Segunda, Vieques, Puerto Rico
- Coordinates: 18°08′57″N 65°26′29″W
- Built: 1850
- Architect: Francisco María Belgodere
- Architectural style: Spanish Colonial Vernacular
- NRHP reference No.: 94000174
- RNSZH No.: 2000-(RE)-18-JP-SH

Significant dates
- Added to NRHP: March 17, 1994
- Designated RNSZH: May 16, 2001

The Vieques City Hall (Spanish: Casa Alcaldía de Vieques), also known as the Vieques Municipal House (Casa Municipal de Vieques) and formerly known as Casa del Rey, is a historic civic building located in the main town square (plaza pública) of Isabel Segunda, the administrative center and main settlement of the island-municipality of Vieques, Puerto Rico. It was added to the National Register of Historic Places in 1994, and to the Puerto Rico Register of Historic Sites and Zones in 2001.

The formal establishment of a city hall and a town plaza in Isabel Segunda, the largest town of the island of Vieques happened as the result of a widespread reform in civic and social developments around Cuba and Puerto Rico during the mid 19th-century, then the two last remaining Spanish colonies in the Caribbean. The project was designed by civil engineer Francisco M. Belgodere in 1843, with support of the then Spanish governor Francisco Sainz. Construction of a cabildo and civic center, then referred to as a Casa del Rey (Spanish for 'king's house'), began in 1850 using primarily a vernacular style popular in civic buildings at the time that incorporated elements of Spanish Colonial and Neoclassical architecture. The original structure of the Casa del Rey can still be appreciated today in the northwestern single-story portion of the building. The city hall underwent further additions, including the modern principal two-storey core of the building, that lasted until 1903, under the mayorship of Luis Amadée. The distinctive castellated clock tower was lastly added in 1937. Additional renovations and minor modifications to the roofing were made in 1948.

== See also ==
- National Register of Historic Places listings in eastern Puerto Rico
