= Guzmán Family Pantheon =

- U.S. National Register of Historic Places
- Puerto Rico Historic Sites and Zones
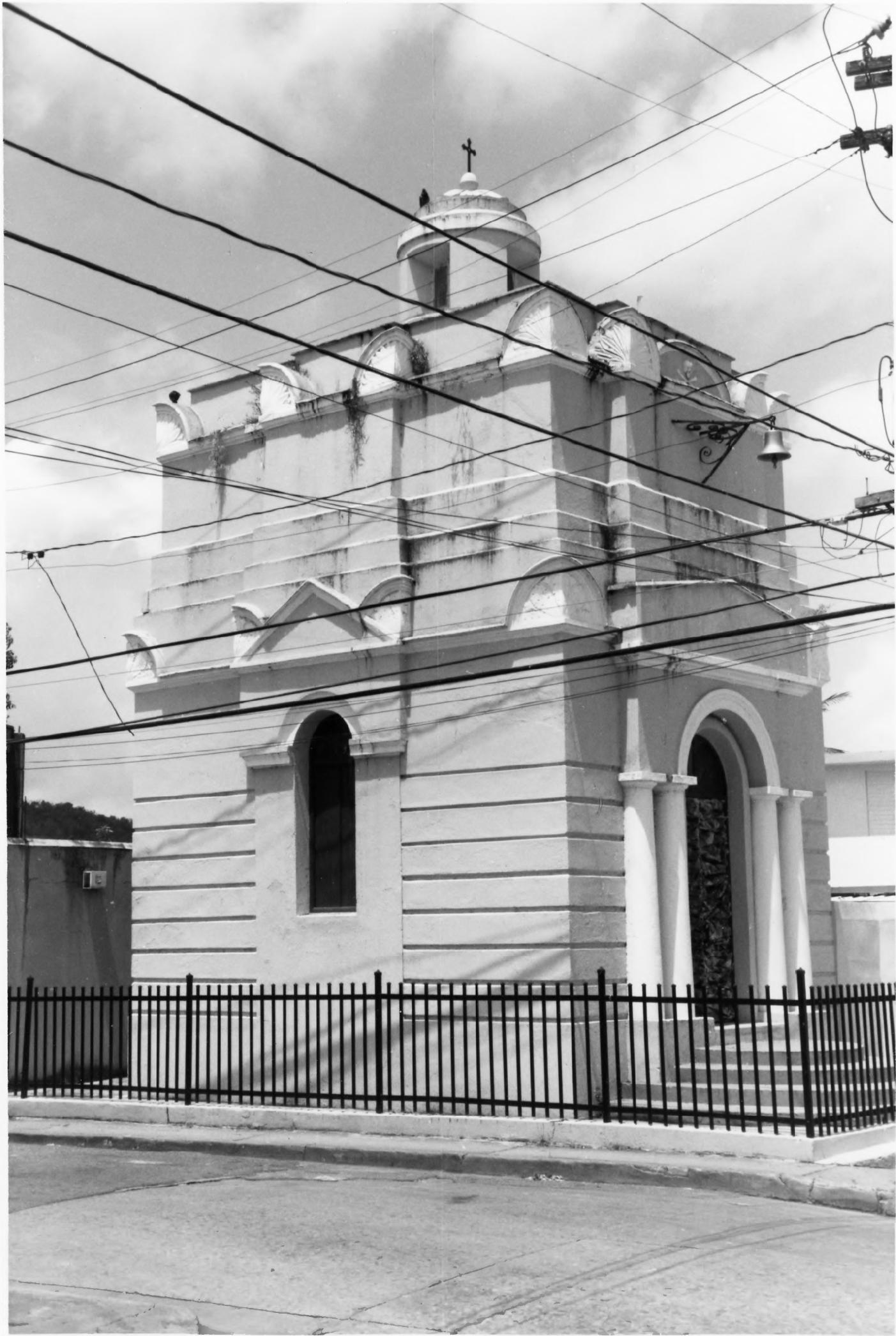
- The chapel in 1995.

- Location within Puerto Rico
- Location: Junction of Padre Rivera and Miguel Casillas streets in Humacao, Puerto Rico
- Coordinates: 18°9′8″N 65°49′40″W
- Built: 1864
- NRHP reference No.: 95000436
- RNSZH No.: 2000-(RE)-18-JP-SH

Significant dates
- Added to NRHP: April 17, 1995
- Designated RNSZH: May 16, 2001

The Guzmán Family Pantheon (Spanish: Panteón de la Familia Guzmán), also known as the Guzmán Hermitage (Ermita Guzmán), is a single story, lime-stuccoed, brick masonry funerary chapel located in Humacao Pueblo (downtown Humacao), in the Puerto Rican municipality of the same name. The structure was built in 1864 the Eclectic style, with Classic, Renaissance and Exotic architectural elements.

The so-called Ermita Guzman, built in 1864, was originally built as a funerary pantheon to house the mortal remains of the Guzman family. It is possible that it was also originally intended to house the celebration of certain religious activities to honor their memory.

The chapel was added to the National Register of Historic Places in 1995, and to the Puerto Rico Register of Historic Sites and Zones on May 16, 2001.

== Gallery ==
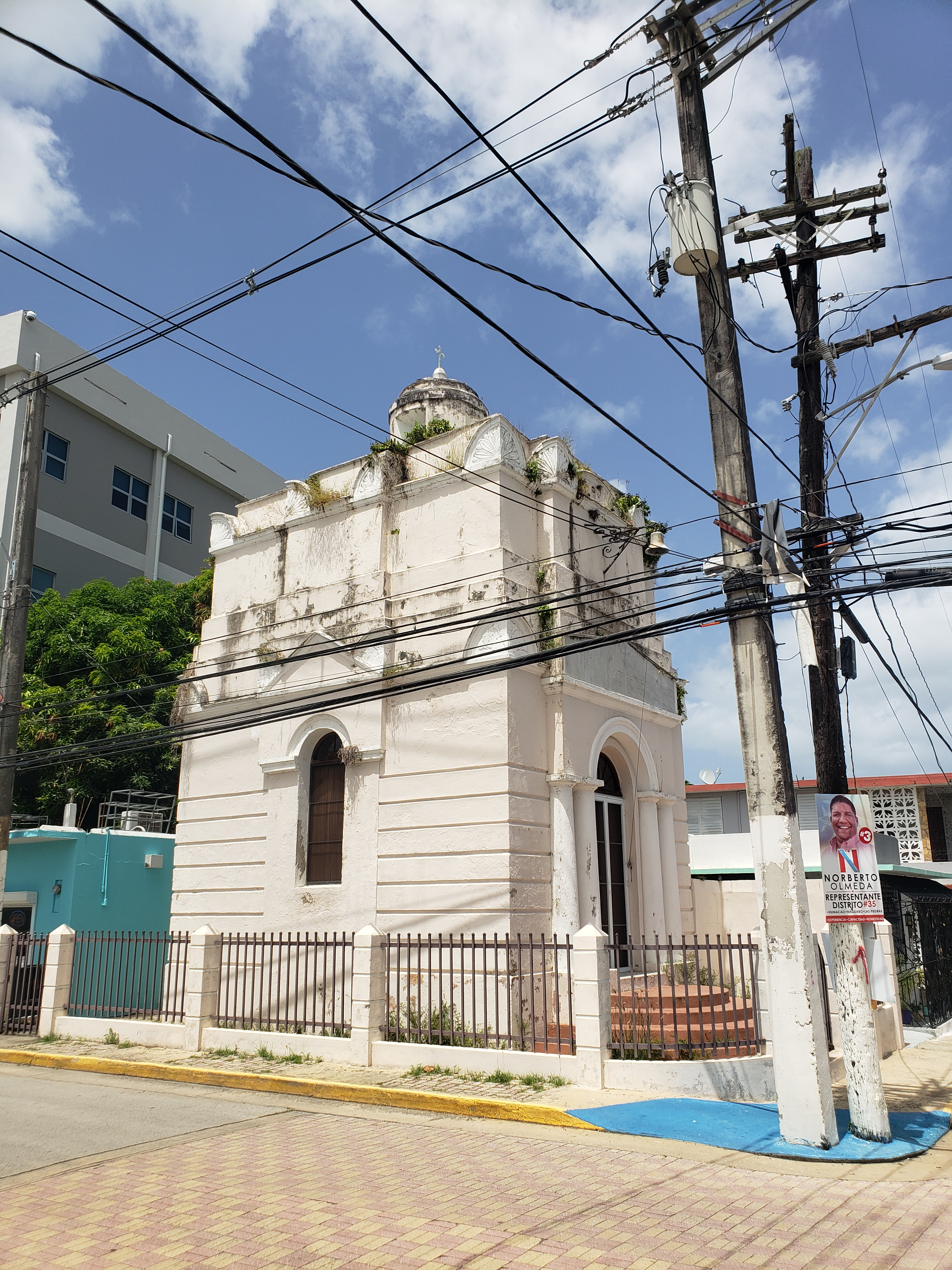
The chapel in 2020.

== See also ==
- Panteón Otero-Martínez: NRHP listing in Vega Baja, Puerto Rico
- National Register of Historic Places listings in eastern Puerto Rico
