= Playa Vieja =

Historic site in Vieques, Puerto Rico

- Playa Vieja (12VPr2-70)
- U.S. National Register of Historic Places
- Location: Address restricted in Punta Arenas, Vieques, Puerto Rico
- NRHP reference No.: 92001235
- Added to NRHP: September 10, 1992

The Playa Vieja site (Spanish for "old beach"), also known as Site 12VPr2-70, is an archaeological site located in Punta Arenas in the Puerto Rican island-municipality of Vieques. The site was first uncovered in 1978 by a Navy-sponsored archaeological survey led by Marvin Keller, and later archaeological surveys in 1980 uncovered additional prehistoric material including 2,738 artifacts and additional biological human evidence belonging to the Saladoid and Ostionoid cultures. The site has been listed in the National Register of Historic Places since 1992 and it is located within the borders of the Vieques National Wildlife Refuge.

== See also ==
- Taino archaeology
