= Algodones 3 (12VPr2-205) =

Historic site in Vieques, Puerto Rico

- U.S. National Register of Historic Places
- Location: Address restricted in Puerto Diablo, Vieques, Puerto Rico
- NRHP reference No.: 91001038
- Added to NRHP: August 21, 1991

Algodones 3 (12VPr2-205) is an archaeological site located in the Puerto Diablo barrio of the island-municipality of Vieques, Puerto Rico. The site, first uncovered in May 1982 as part of an archaeological survey of the Vieques Naval Reservation, consists of a former indigenous village. The site contained ceramics in addition to scattered shells and stones used by the aboriginal inhabitants between 900 and 1300 AD, the Elenoid period. The site today is found within the borders of the Vieques National Wildlife Refuge. It was added to the National Register of Historic Places along with other archaeological sites in the area.

== See also ==
- Taino archaeology
