= Panteón Otero-Martínez =

- Panteon Otero-Martínez
- U.S. National Register of Historic Places
- Puerto Rico Historic Sites and Zones
- Location within Puerto Rico
- Location: Old Vega Baja Cemetery, PR 670, Vega Baja, Puerto Rico
- Coordinates: 18°26′49″N 66°23′34″W
- Built: 1886
- Architectural style: Classical Revival
- NRHP reference No.: 84003135
- RNSZH No.: 2000-(RMSJ)-00-JP-SH

Significant dates
- Added to NRHP: July 30, 1984
- Designated RNSZH: February 3, 2000

Panteón Otero-Martínez, also known as Otero-Martinez Mausoleum, is a mausoleum which was built in 1886. It is located in the Old Vega Baja Cemetery, in Vega Baja, Puerto Rico. It was listed on the National Register of Historic Places as "Panteon Otero-Martinez" in 1984, and on the Puerto Rico Register of Historic Sites and Zones in 2000.

It is a mausoleum that measures 10.25 feet (3.12 m) by 11.833 feet (3.607 m) and is located in a fenced lot that is 19 feet (5.8 m) by 17.667 feet (5.385 m).

== See also ==
- Guzmán Family Pantheon: NRHP listing in Humacao, Puerto Rico
- National Register of Historic Places listings in northern Puerto Rico
