= Williams Products Corporation =

- Williams Products Corp.
- U.S. National Register of Historic Places
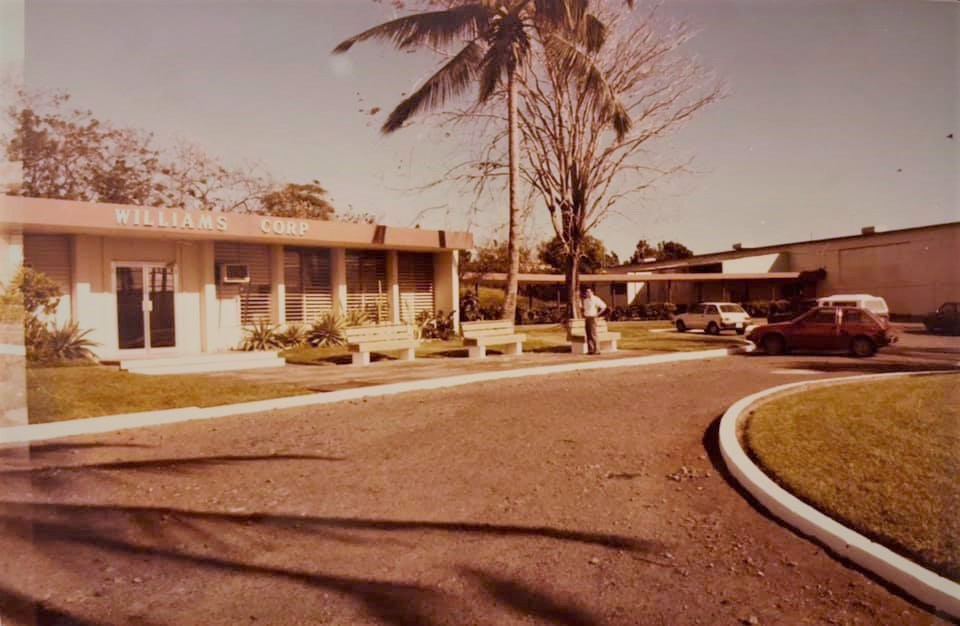
- The Williams Corporation Building, unknown date.

- Location within Puerto Rico
- Location: Highway 992, km 0.3, Mata de Plátano, Luquillo, Puerto Rico
- Coordinates: 18°22′16″N 65°43′7″W
- Built: 1957
- Architect: René O. Ramírez
- Architectural style: Modernist
- NRHP reference No.: 12000938
- Added to NRHP: November 14, 2012

The Williams Products Corporation Factory (Spanish: Fábrica de Fomento de la Williams Products Corporation), popularly referred to as La Williams, is a historic factory building located in the municipality of Luquillo, Puerto Rico. It was added to the United States National Register of Historic Places in 2012.

The plant, enlarged two times throughout the years, sits amongst several similar prototypical buildings at an industrial park southwest of town, alongside Road PR-992, Kilometer 0.3. The plant occupies a lot measuring 6,170 square meters. The building adheres to Prototype L, one of a number of alphabetically labeled design alternatives endorsed by the Puerto Rico Development Corporation to encourage the island's industrialization by building plants to expedite the establishment of investors. René O. Ramírez, one of Puerto Rico's earliest and most resolutely modern architects, was responsible for the prototype's design. Combining steel, concrete, and cement masonry units - supporting an A-frame above concrete beams and columns - the rectangular-shaped property embodies key stylistic, architectural tenets pertaining to the Modern Movement.
