= Yabucoa Fire Station =

Historic building in Yabucoa, Puerto Rico

- U.S. National Register of Historic Places
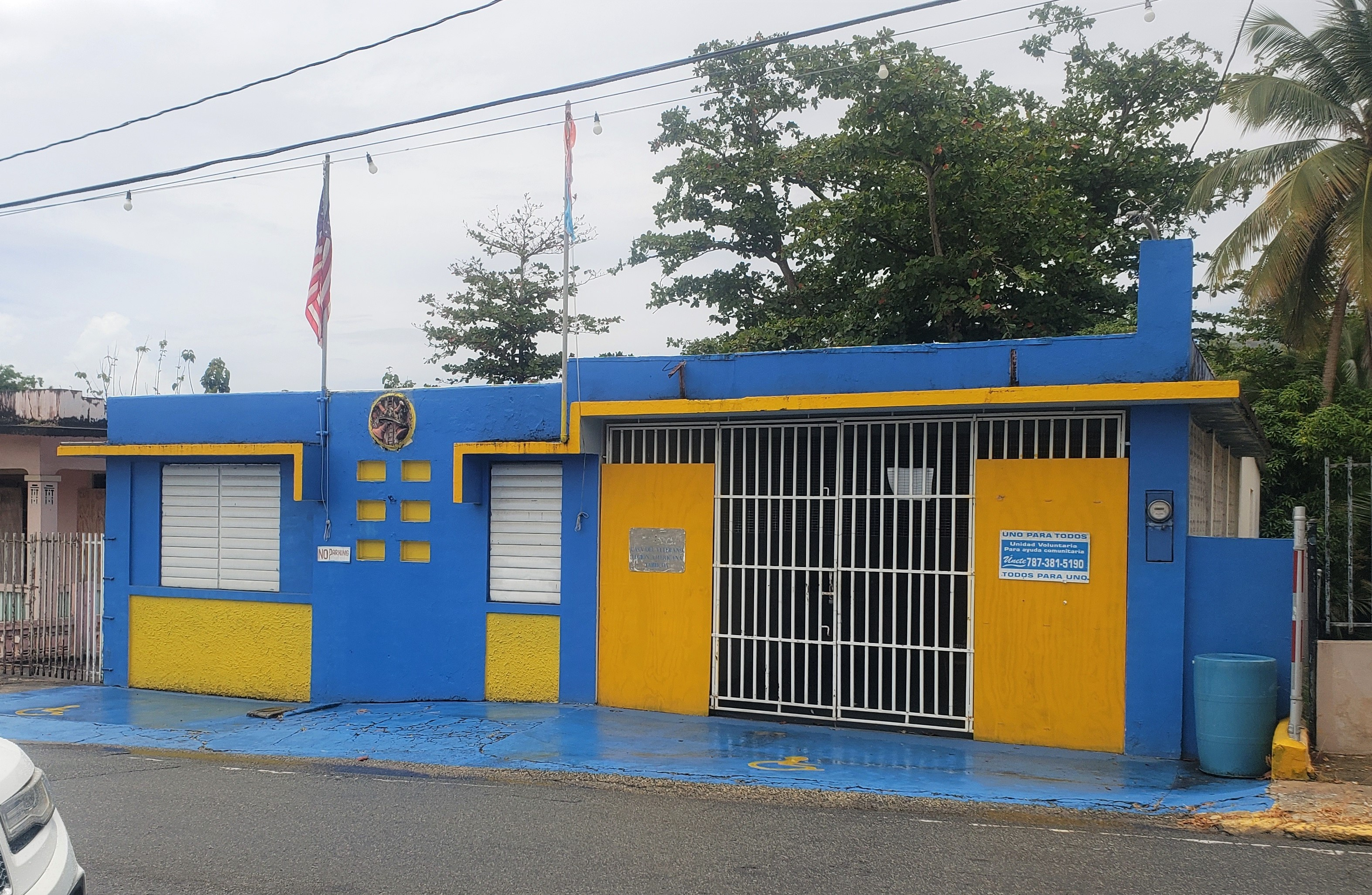
- Yabucoa Fire Station

- Location within Puerto Rico
- Location: 22 Luis Muñoz Rivera St., Yabucoa, Puerto Rico
- Coordinates: 18°03′07″N 65°52′38″W
- Area: 0.1 acres (0.040 ha)
- Built: 1943
- Architect: Dept. Public Works of Puerto Rico
- Architectural style: Art Deco
- MPS: Fire Stations in Puerto Rico MPS
- NRHP reference No.: 13000015
- Added to NRHP: February 13, 2013

The Yabucoa Fire Station, at 22 Luis Munoz Rivera St. in Yabucoa, Puerto Rico, was built in 1943. It was listed on the National Register of Historic Places in 2013.

It has also been known as Parque de Bombas de Yabucoa.
