= Casa Alcaldía de Maunabo =

- U.S. National Register of Historic Places
- Puerto Rico Historic Sites and Zones
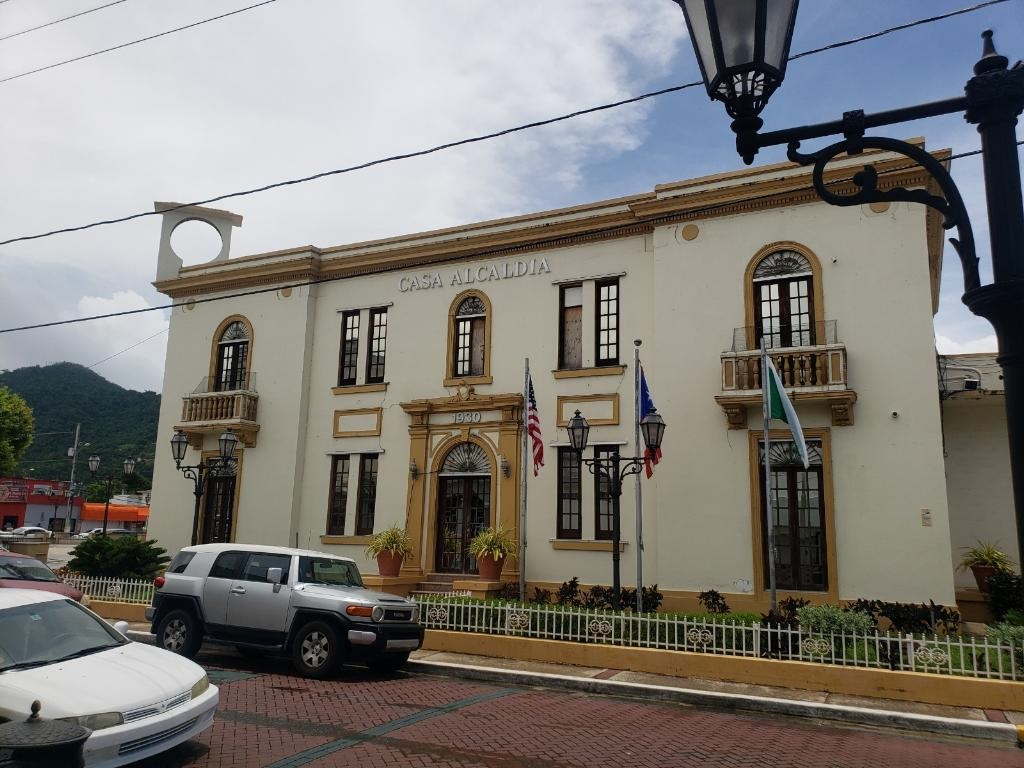
- Casa Alcaldía de Maunabo in 2024

- Location within Puerto Rico
- Location: Calle Santiago Iglesias #8 Maunabo, Puerto Rico
- Coordinates: 18°00′25″N 65°53′50″W
- Built: 1930
- Architect: Rafael Carmoega
- Architectural style: Spanish architecture
- NRHP reference No.: 100008050
- RNSZH No.: 2000-(RMSJ)-00-JP-SH

Significant dates
- Added to NRHP: August 23, 2022
- Designated RNSZH: February 3, 2000

Casa Alcaldía de Maunabo (Maunabo City Hall) is a historic civic building from the early 20th century listed on the National Register of Historic Places in August 23, 2022. Located in the southern quadrant of the main square and next to the Catholic parish of the town of Maunabo, Puerto Rico, the construction of the town hall came to represent the final piece in the old Spanish urban trilogy on the island: square, church, and town hall.
