= Baño Grande =

- U.S. National Register of Historic Places
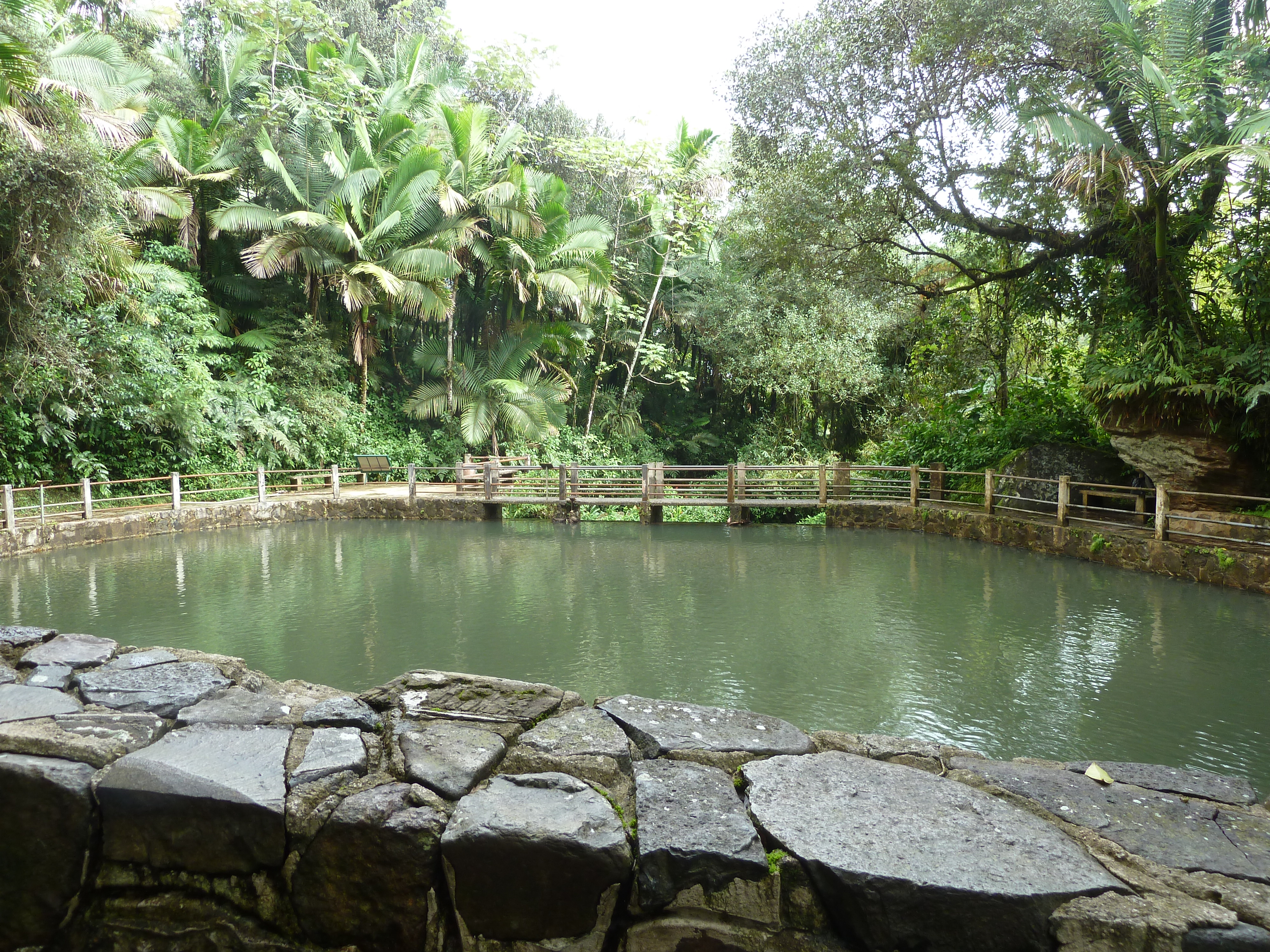
- Baño Grande in 2013

- Location within Puerto Rico
- Location: Road 191 km 11.85 Río Grande, Puerto Rico
- Coordinates: 18°18′06″N 65°47′07″W
- Built: 1935-1938
- Architect: R.E. Pidgeon, H. Randolph, Civilian Conservation Corps
- Architectural style: International Craftsman style
- NRHP reference No.: 100000685
- Added to NRHP: February 28, 2017

Baño Grande (Spanish for big bath) is a former swimming pool and historic site located in El Yunque National Forest in Río Grande, Puerto Rico. It is also known as La Mina Pool (Piscina de la Mina or just La Piscina), after La Mina River. It is the larger of the two swimming pools built by the Civilian Conservation Corps (CCC) in El Yunque, being three times larger than the nearby Baño de Oro pool. Baño Grande is 18 feet (5.5 meters) deep, and it is reinforced by a stone and masonry dam of an unnamed creek belonging to the La Mina River watershed.

The pool was designed by architects R.E. Pidgeon and H. Randolph (who also designed the Baño de Oro pool and related recreational infrastructure), and it was built by the Civilian Conservation Corps between 1935 and 1938 using stone masonry and reinforced concrete as the material. It was operational between the years 1935 and 1968 when it was closed due to safety issues. Although the pool was closed and swimming is no longer permitted, it remained well-maintained, and today it is preserved as a historic site open to the public as a scenic spot. The pool was listed on the National Register of Historic Places on February 28, 2017, as one of the New Deal Era Constructions in the Forest Reserves in Puerto Rico (1933–1942).

Baño Grande is located in the La Mina Recreational Area within the Palo Colorado section of El Yunque, and it is connected to the trail network of the forest.

== Gallery ==
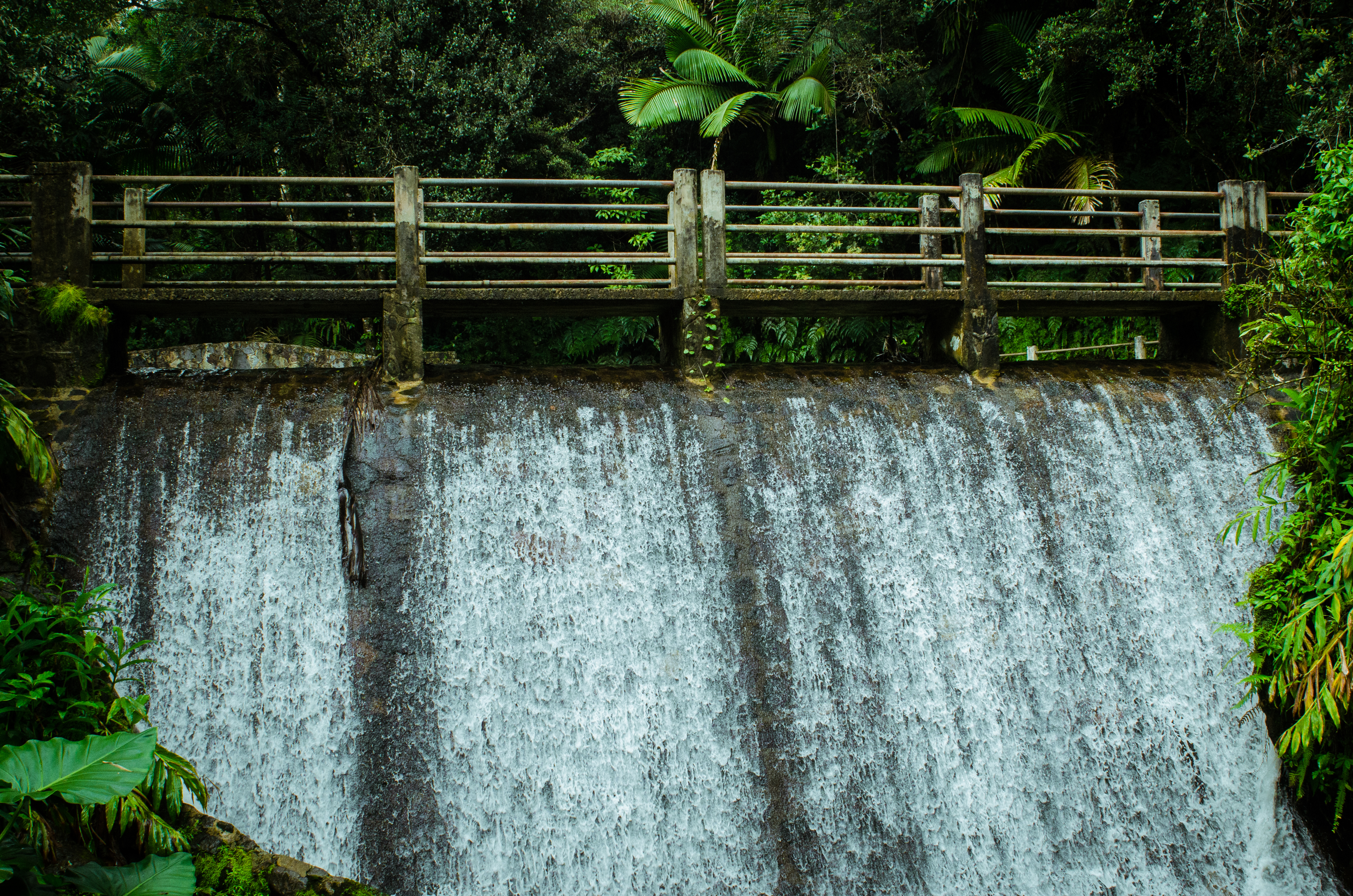
Masonry dam of Baño Grande

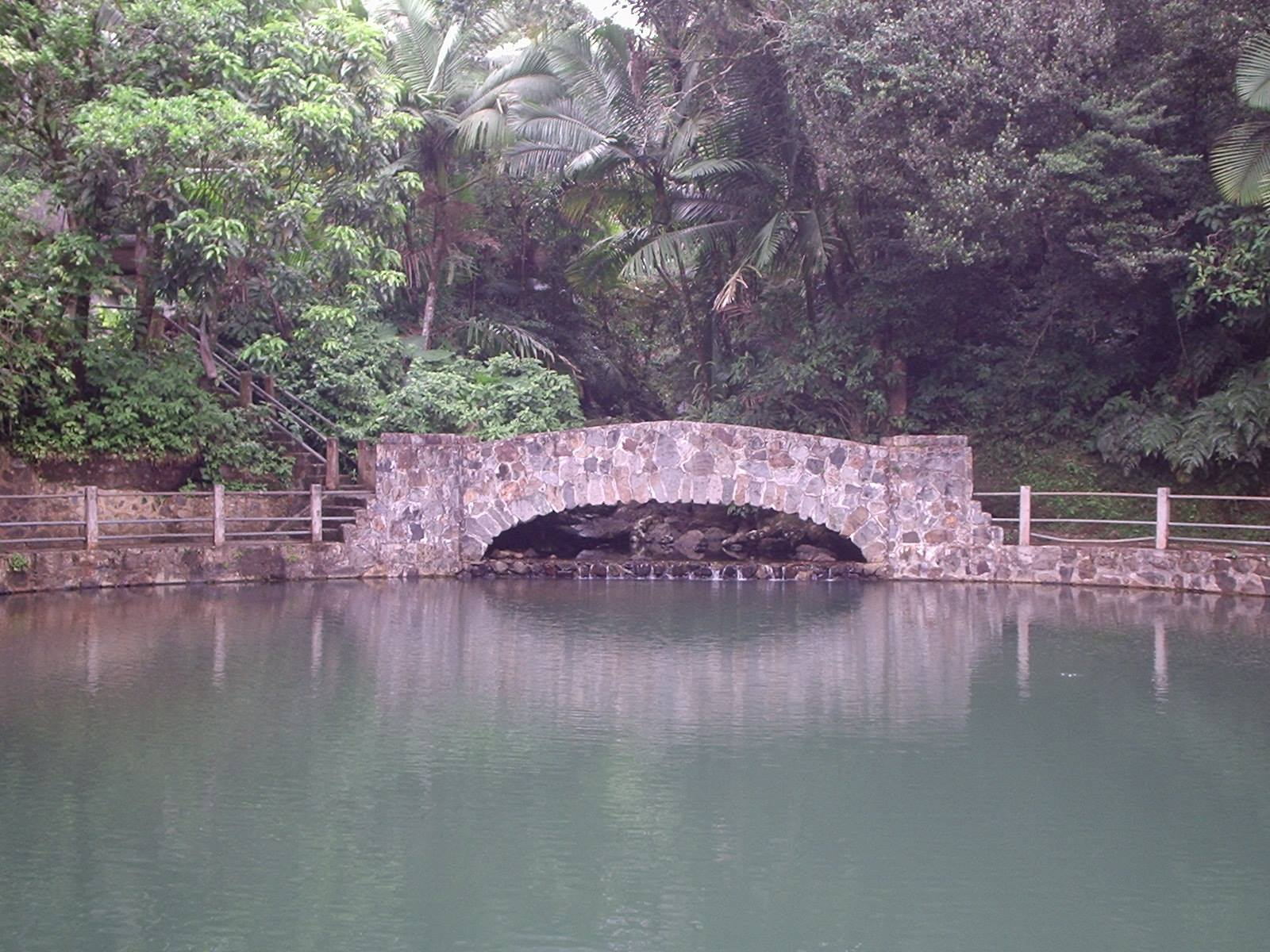
Baño Grande stone bridge
