= Ceiba Fire Station =

Historic place in Ceiba, Puerto Rico

- U.S. National Register of Historic Places
- Location within Puerto Rico
- Location: 226 Lauro Piñero Avenue, Ceiba, Puerto Rico
- Coordinates: 18°15′59″N 65°38′52″W
- Area: 0.1 acres (0.040 ha)
- Built: 1954
- Built by: Department Public Works of Puerto Rico
- Architectural style: Art Deco
- MPS: Fire Stations in Puerto Rico MPS
- NRHP reference No.: 13000012
- Added to NRHP: February 13, 2013

The Ceiba Fire Station, at 226 Lauro Piñero Avenue in Ceiba, Puerto Rico, was built in 1954. It was listed on the National Register of Historic Places in 2013.

It is a two-story 15 feet (4.6 m) wide, 35 feet (11 m) deep, building, set back about 20 feet (6.1 m). Fire hoses were cleaned and hung to dry on its second floor terrace.
