= Algodones 2 (12VPr2-204) =

Historic site in Vieques, Puerto Rico

- U.S. National Register of Historic Places
- Location: Address restricted in Puerto Diablo, Vieques, Puerto Rico
- NRHP reference No.: 91001037
- Added to NRHP: August 21, 1991

The Algodones 2 (12VPr2-204) site is an archaeological site located in the Puerto Diablo barrio of the Puerto Rican island municipality of Vieques. The archaeological site, first documented in 1982 by Ecology and Environment, Inc. in the former Vieques Naval Reservation, consists of a former indigenous village with scattered pieces of pottery. The site shows evidence of inhabitation throughout different cultural periods including the Late Saladoid culture (600-800 CE), the Ostionoid culture (800-900 CE), the Elenoid culture (900-1300 CE), and the Chicoid culture (1300-1500 CE). The site constitutes an important archaeological resource and it was added to the National Register of Historic Places in 1991.

== See also ==
- Taino archaeology
