= Quebrada Maracuto =

- U.S. National Register of Historic Places
- Location: Address restricted
- Nearest city: Carolina, Puerto Rico
- MPS: Prehistoric Rock Art of Puerto Rico MPS
- NRHP reference No.: 04000909
- Added to NRHP: August 27, 2004

Quebrada Maracuto, in the municipality of Carolina, Puerto Rico, is a prehistoric rock art site. It was listed on the National Register of Historic Places in 2004.

The site includes seven boulders with petroglyphs.

Images in the petroglyphs include faces and a carved clockwise spiral.
