= Río Grande Fire Station =

Historic place in Luquillo, Puerto Rico

- U.S. National Register of Historic Places
- Location within Puerto Rico
- Location: 6 Juan R. González St., Río Grande, Puerto Rico
- Coordinates: 18°22′46″N 65°49′49″W
- Area: less than one acre
- Built: 1951
- Built by: Dept Public Works Puerto Rico
- Architectural style: Art Deco
- MPS: Fire Stations in Puerto Rico MPS
- NRHP reference No.: 12001248
- Added to NRHP: January 29, 2013

The Río Grande Fire Station, at 6 Juan R. González Street at Del Carmen Street in Río Grande, Puerto Rico. It was noted in the NRIS database of the National Register of Historic Places in 2012, but may not have actually been listed then; its listing status was "DR".
