= Río de la Mina (Río Grande, Puerto Rico) =

River of Puerto Rico

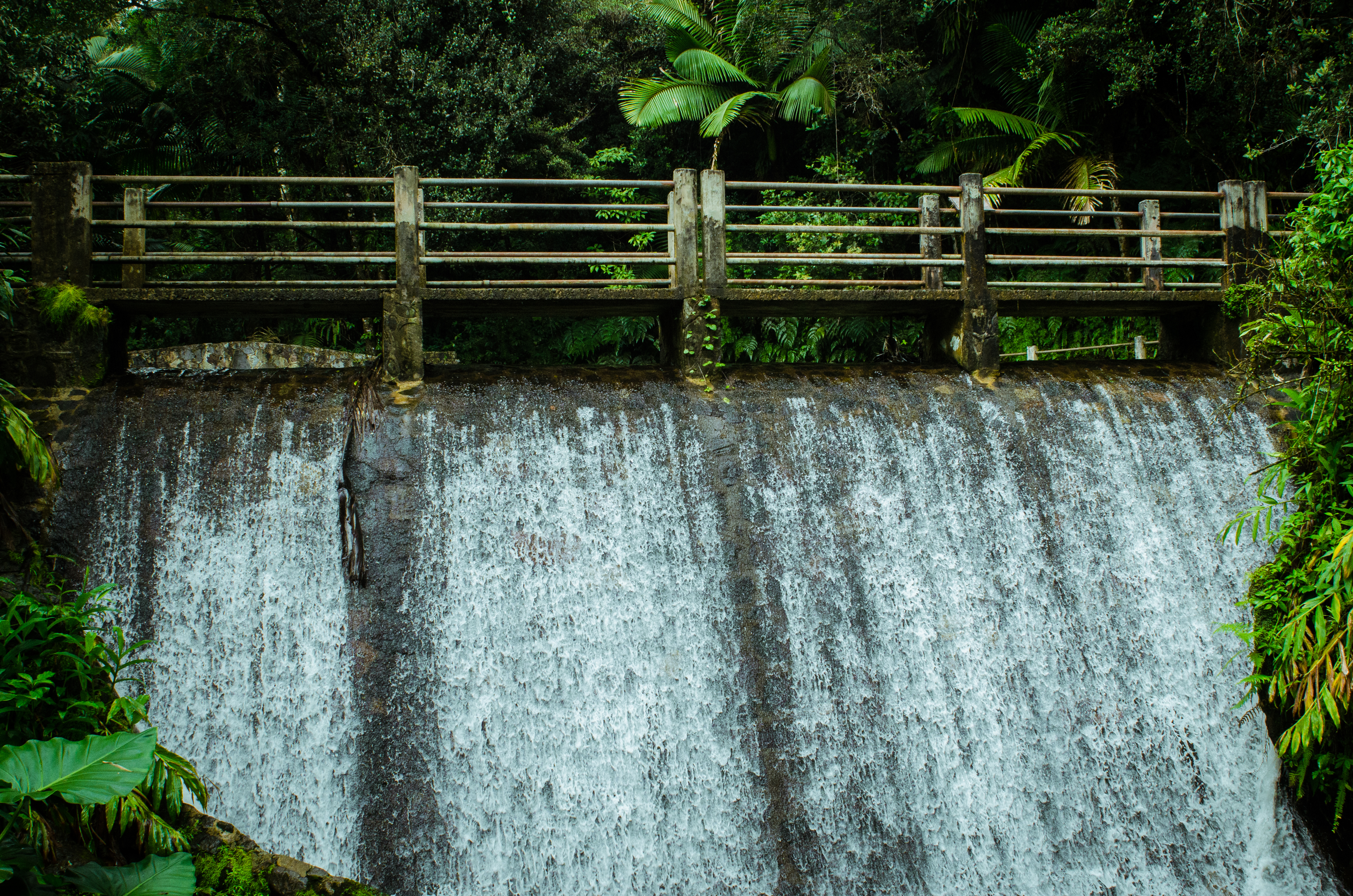
- Masonry dam of Baño Grande

- Location within Puerto Rico

Location
- Commonwealth: Puerto Rico
- Municipality: Río Grande, Luquillo

Physical characteristics
- Source
  - coordinates: 18.3080090°N 65.7615515°W
  - elevation: 2408 ft.
- Length: 2.1 m (6 ft 11 in)

National Wild and Scenic River
- Type: Scenic
- Designated: December 19, 2002

The Río de la Mina is a river of Río Grande and Luquillo in Puerto Rico. It is near La Mina Trail and Big Tree Trail in Luquillo, Puerto Rico and it is 2.1 miles (3.4 km) long.

== Variant names ==
- Rio de la Mina
- Rio la Mina

== See also ==
- List of rivers of Puerto Rico
