= Vieques Pharmacy =

Historic building in Vieques, Puerto Rico

- U.S. National Register of Historic Places
- Puerto Rico Historic Sites and Zones
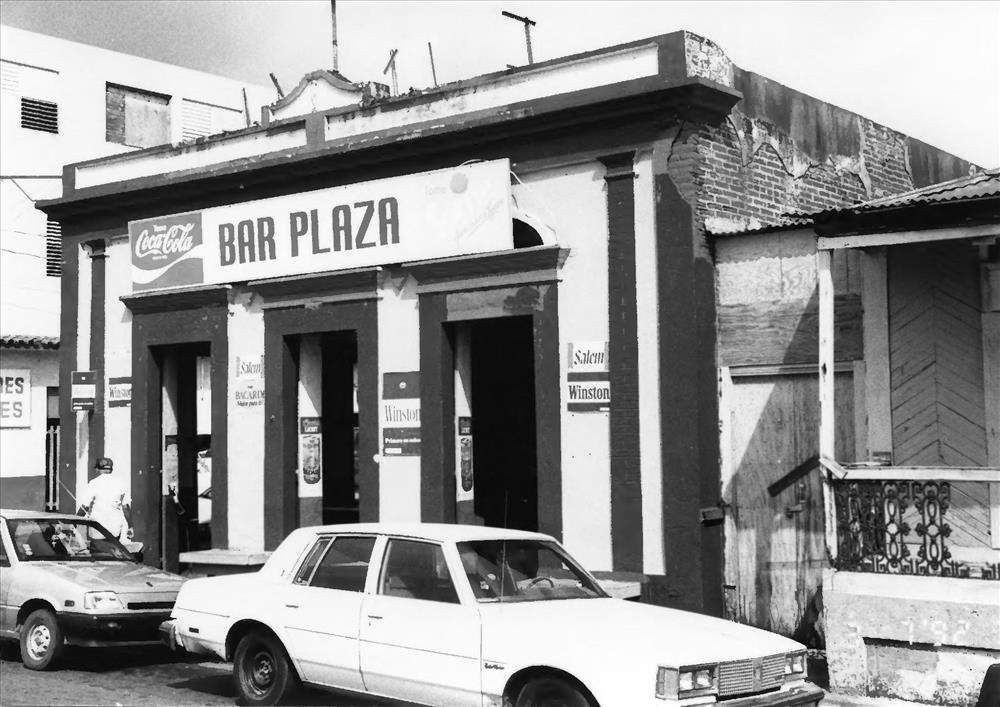
- The building in 1992.

- Location within Puerto Rico
- Location: Junction of Carlos LeBrun and Víctor Duteil Streets Isabel Segunda, Vieques, Puerto Rico
- Coordinates: 18°08′58″N 65°26′30″W
- Built: 1898
- Architectural style: Vernacular
- NRHP reference No.: 94000061
- RNSZH No.: 2000-(RE)-18-JP-SH

Significant dates
- Added to NRHP: March 2, 1994
- Designated RNSZH: May 16, 2001

Vieques Pharmacy (Spanish: Farmacia de Vieques) is a historic building that has formerly housed a pharmacy and the main post office of the island-municipality of Vieques, Puerto Rico. The building is located in front of the main town square (plaza pública) of Isabel Segunda, the main settlement and administrative center of Vieques. The building is a one-story masonry structure originally intended to be a commercial building. It dates to 1898 when it functioned as a pharmacy, the then called Farmacia de Vieques Liberty Drug underwent remodeling between 1900 and 1903 when the building was under the ownership of Victor Molinary Duteil, a French-Puerto Rican pharmacist and vice-consul of Denmark in Vieques. He was responsible for strengthening the diplomatic and economic ties between Vieques and the then Danish Virgin Islands and later, during and after the Spanish-American War, he helped establish various federal institutions in the island such as a post office and worked as an official translator for the U.S. government until 1910 when he was elected mayor of the island-municipality. Throughout the rest of its history the building continued to serve as a convenience store and as a bar. The building today maintains its architectural integrity and today is the oldest and best-preserved building of its type in Vieques, and the building was added to the National Register of Historic Places in 1994, and to the Puerto Rico Register of Historic Sites and Zones in 2001.
