= Teófilo José Jaime María Le Guillou =

Founder of Vieques municipality, Puerto Rico

- Born: May 4, 1790; Quimperlé, France
- Died: July 9, 1843 (aged 53); Santa Isabel, Vieques, Puerto Rico
- Spouse: Madame Guillermina Ana Susana Poncet

Notes
- Le Guillou was the founder of the municipality of Vieques, Puerto Rico.

Teófilo José Jaime María Le Guillou (May 4, 1790 – July 9, 1843) was the founder of the municipality of Vieques, Puerto Rico.

== Early years ==
Le Guillou was born in Quimperlé, France. He immigrated from France to the Island of Guadeloupe in the French West Indies where he became a land owner.

== Founder of Vieques Municipality ==
In 1823, Le Guillou went to the island of Vieques with the intention of purchasing hardwoods. The island at the time had a few residents who were dedicated woodcutters. He was impressed with the island of Vieques and saw the agricultural potential of the island. He returned the following year and purchased lands from a woodcutter named Patricio Ramos. Soon, he established the largest sugar plantation on the island which he named "La Pacience". He then got rid of the pirates and those involved in contraband activities an action which in itself pleased the Spanish colonial government. Le Guillou is considered to be the founder of the municipality of Vieques.

== Military commander of Vieques ==
In 1832, Le Guillou succeeded Francisco Rosello as the military commander of Vieques after Rosello's death. Between 1832 and 1843, Le Guillou who had been given the title of "Political and Military Governor of the Spanish Island of Vieques" by the Spanish Crown, developed a plan for the political and economic organization of the island. He established five sugar plantations in the island named Esperanza, Resolucion, Destino, Mon Repos and Mi Reposo.

== French immigrants ==
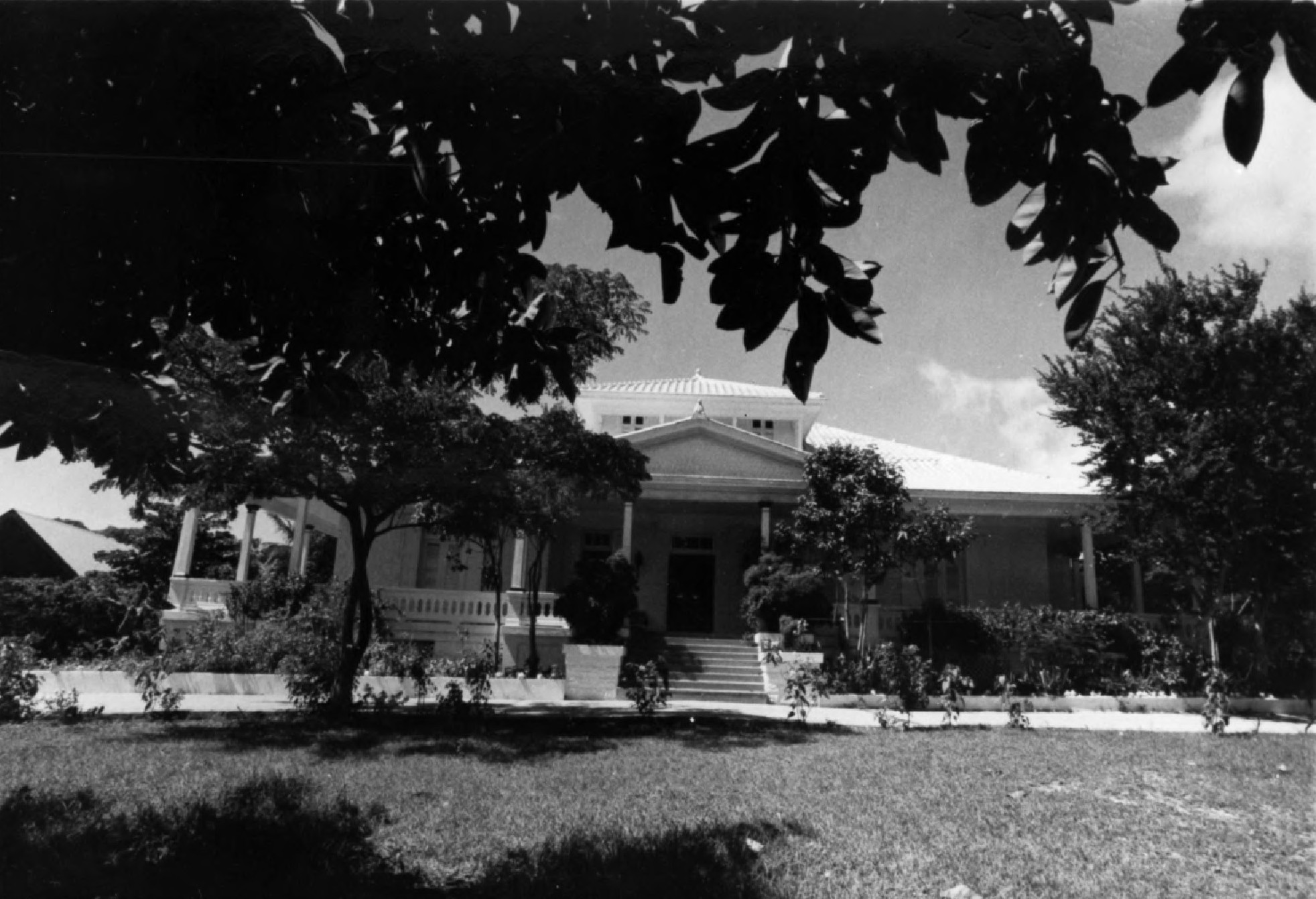
House of Henri Muraille

Le Guillou, who was the most powerful landlord and owner of slaves in the island, requested from the Spanish Crown permission to allow the immigration of French families from the Caribbean Islands of Martinique and Guadalupe which at the time were French possessions. Attracted by the offer of free land as one of the concessions stipulated in the revised Spanish Royal Decree of 1815, dozens of French families, among them the Mouraille, Martineau and Le Brun families, immigrated to Vieques and, with the use of slave labor, established sugar plantations. By 1839, there were 138 "habitaciones," from the French word "habitation," meaning plantation. These habitaciones were located from Punta Mulas to Punta Arenas.

== Later years ==
Le Guillou died in 1843 and is buried in Las Tumbas de Le Guillou in Isabel Segunda, Vieques Municipality. The town of Isabel II of Vieques was founded in 1844. His wife Madame Guillermina Ana Susana Poncet died in 1855 and is buried alongside Le Guillou. The cemetery where Le Guillou and his wife are buried was officially named "Las Tumbas de J. J. María le Guillou" by the United States Department of the Interior and was listed in the National Register of Historic Places on August 26, 1994, reference #94000923.

== See also ==
- List of Puerto Ricans
- French immigration to Puerto Rico
