= Vieques National Wildlife Refuge =

Refuge in Puerto Rico

- IUCN category IV (habitat/species management area)
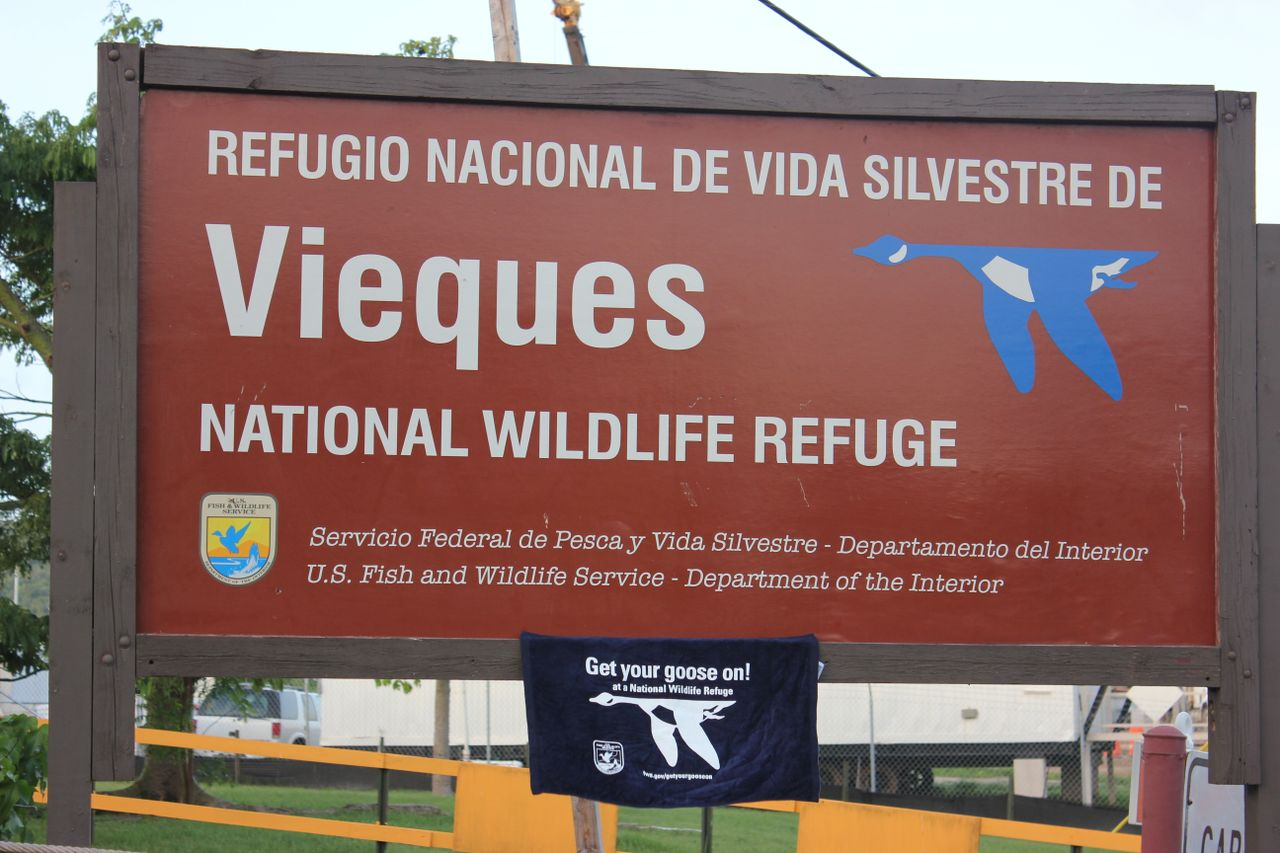

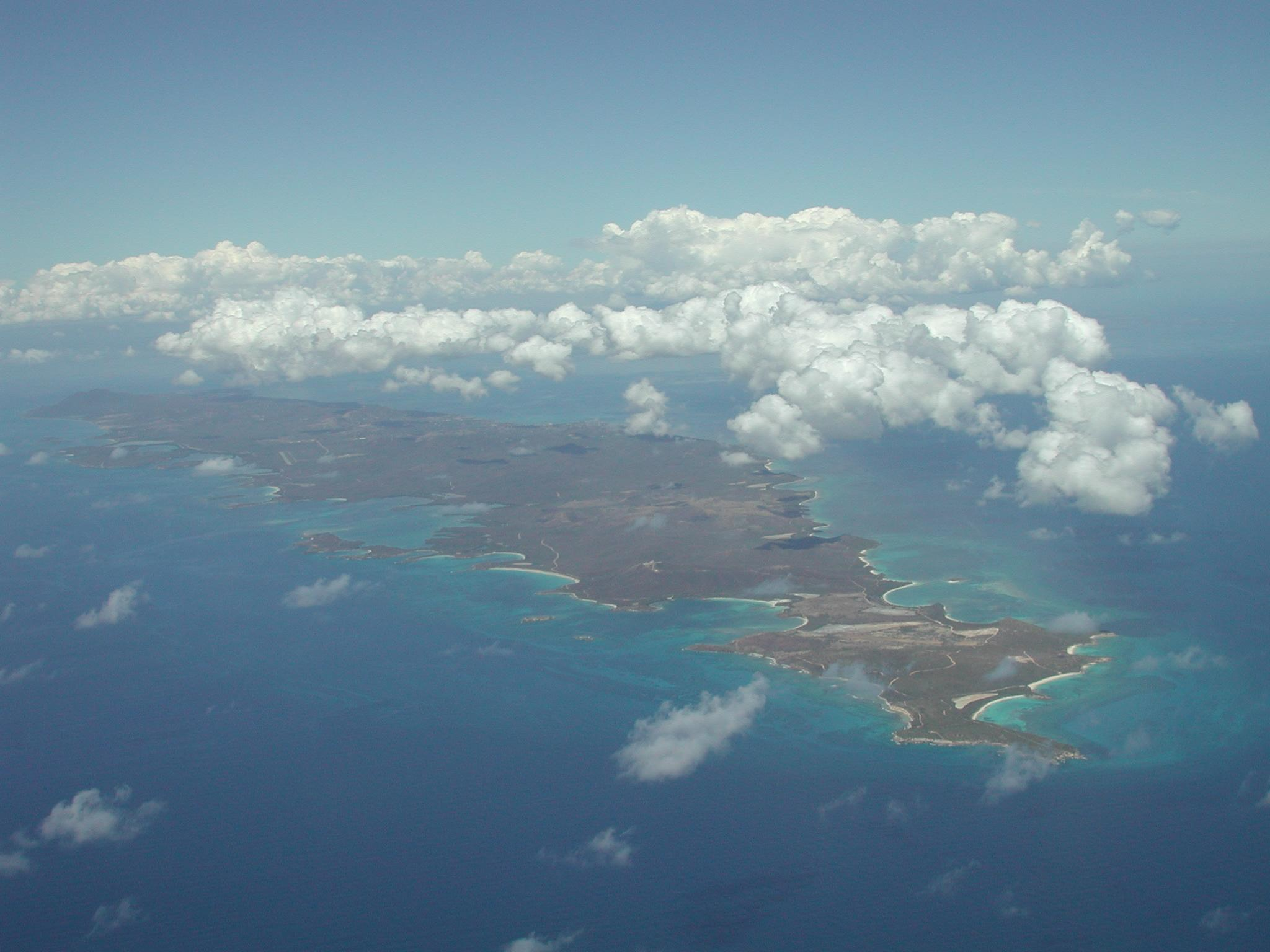
- Aerial view of Vieques

- Location within Puerto Rico
- Location: Vieques, Puerto Rico, Caribbean
- Coordinates: 18.1167°N 65.4167°W
- Area: 17,771 acres (71.92 km^{2})
- Established: 2001
- Governing body: U.S. Fish and Wildlife Service
- Website: Vieques National Wildlife Refuge

The Vieques National Wildlife Refuge (Spanish: Refugio nacional de vida silvestre de Vieques) is a National Wildlife Refuge on the island of Vieques in the Puerto Rico archipelago. It is part of the Caribbean Islands National Wildlife Refuge Complex.

The refuge contains several ecologically distinct habitats including; beaches, coastal lagoons, mangrove wetlands, and upland forested areas. Some of the best examples of sub-tropical dry forest in the Caribbean can be found on refuge lands.

The marine environment surrounding the refuge contains coral reefs and sea grass beds. The refuge and its surrounding waters are home to at least two plants and eight animals on the Federal endangered species list including; the Antillean manatee (Trichechus manatus manatus), the brown pelican (Pelecanus occidentalis), and four species of sea turtles.

In addition to its ecological value, the refuge contains important resources of archeological and historic significance, a legacy of the Taíno culture and sugarcane era.

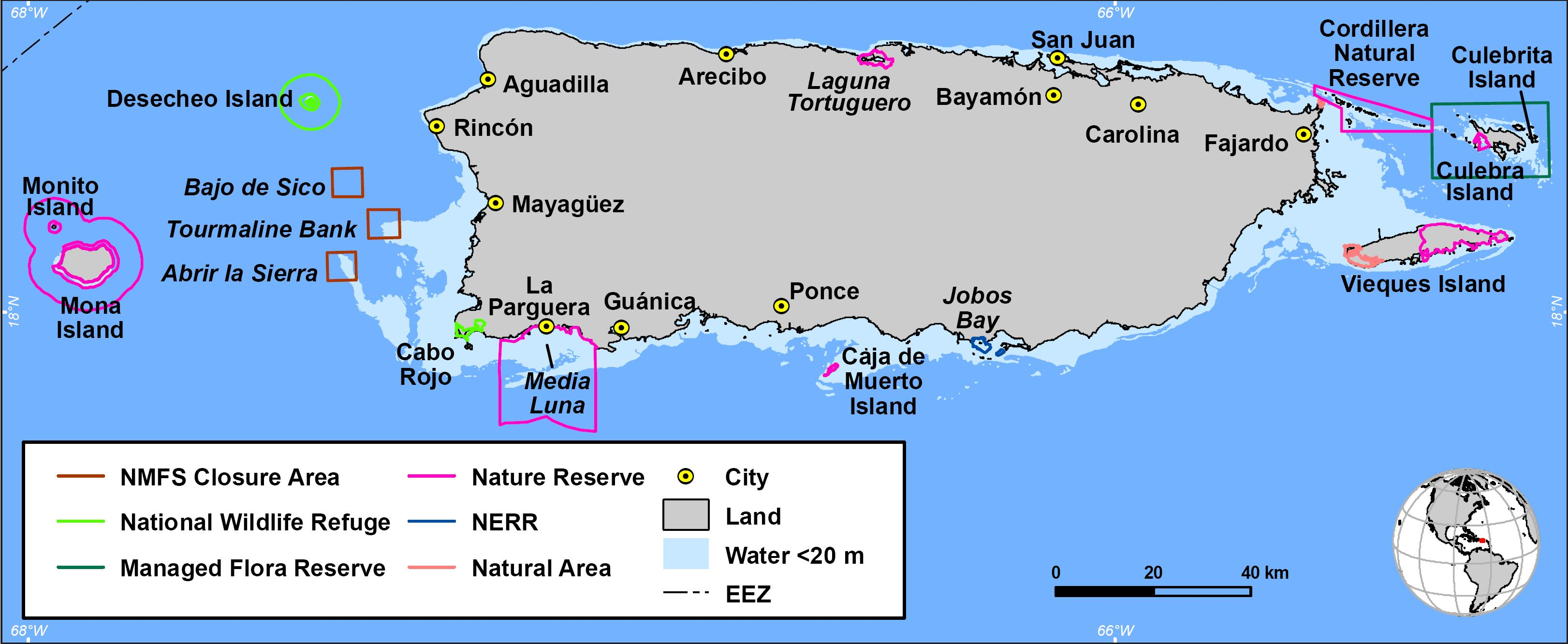
Coral reef ecosystem of Puerto Rico
