= Washington Lloréns =

Puerto Rican writer and lexicographer

Washington Lloréns Lloréns
- Born: 28 November 1899; Ponce, Puerto Rico
- Died: 21 June 1989; San Juan, Puerto Rico
- Education: Temple University
- Occupation(s): Writer, linguist, literary critic, lexicographer, journalist
- Known for: Holder of multiple offices in the area of Puerto Rican Spanish: President of the Institute of Puerto Rican Literature; President of the Puerto Rico Academy of Arts and Sciences; Co-founder of the Academia Puertorriqueña de la Lengua Española; Member of the Real Academia Española

Washington Carlos Lloréns Lloréns (28 November 1899 – 21 June 1989) was a Puerto Rican writer, linguist, lexicographer, journalist and literary critic. Trained as a pharmacist and chemist, he applied his knowledge of science to vocabulary and linguistics, for which he had a passion. As a lexicographer, one of his notable achievements was the inclusion of over 50 Puerto Rican words in the nineteenth edition of the Dictionary of the Royal Academy of the Spanish Language in 1970.

== Synopsis ==
Lloréns was born on 28 November 1899, in Ponce, Puerto Rico. He studied in elementary school in Arroyo and high school in Guayama. He attended Temple University Preparatory School in Philadelphia, where he earned a degree in Pharmacy and Chemistry in 1925. He returned to Puerto Rico and became president of the Association of Chemists and the Puerto Rico Pharmacy Examining Board, director of the Revista Farmacéutica journal and co-editor of the Boletín del Colegio de Químicos. From 1943 through 1963, he worked for the federal government as a chemist in the Federal Laboratory of the Internal Revenue Service Division of Alcohol and Tobacco Taxation, and then retired.

== Writer ==
=== Essays and short stories ===
Lloréns cultivated his passion for literature through his essays and short stories. During his youth, he contributed to the monthly publication Páginas de Juventud and the newspapers El Día and El Aguila de Puerto Rico and to the San Juan weekly titled Puerto Rico Ilustrado. As a professional, he wrote for El Carnaval, El Mundo, Puerto Rico Ilustrado and Alma Latina, among other publications. These articles addressed his literary appreciation for Puerto Rican authors such as Enrique Laguerre, María Cadilla de Martínez, José P.H. Hernández, Manuel Zeno Gandía, Antonio Pedreira, Carmelina Vizcarrondo and Luis Villaronga, and foreign authors such as Azorín, Maeterlinck, Juan Ramón Jiménez and Pirandello. His first book was printed in 1936 and was titled "Críticas Profanas". It included articles on many of these authors.

In the genre of the short story, Lloréns wrote the tales that make up the anthology "Cazador de imposibles (unpublished)", which includes "Montaña en flor". He had two other anthologies: "Catorce pecados de humor y una vida descabellada" (1959) and "La rebelión de los átomos" (1960). In all these three anthologies, Lloréns reveals "the desire to collect, with a realistic vision, the environmental essence and the people who characterize Puerto Rican life, both in the urban centers of the small towns and in the rural interior of the island."

He also wrote essays which addressed linguistic studies. For example, he prepared the unpublished "Antología de barbarismos en Puerto Rico", which collected the grammatical and lexical errors that had filtered into the spoken language and into literary use in Puerto Rican Spanish. In 1955, he became a member of the Academia Puertorriqueña de la Lengua Española (English: Puerto Rican Academy of the Spanish Language) after presenting the lecture "Los dedos de la mano: novela de Enrique Laguerre o la vitalidad del español en Puerto Rico", when he was named a member of the organization. As a member of the Academy, he represented Puerto Rico at the 1956 Congress of Academies of Language held in Madrid and participated in other congresses as well. In 1956, he became secretary of the Lexicographical Committee of the Academy, as well as editorial writer for the magazine "Alma Latina" in San Juan.

=== Literary criticism, linguistics and lexicography ===
Among Lloréns's works on literary criticism, linguistics and lexicographical studies are "Un intruso en el jardín de Academo" (1957), "El español de Puerto Rico y la decimoctava edición del Diccionario de la Real Academia Española" (1957) and "Comentarios a refranes, modismos, locuciones de 'Conversao en el batey' de Ernesto Juan Fonfrías" (1962). In these essays, Lloréns was critical and unyielding toward the transgressions of Puerto Ricans in the spoken vernacular, which, according to him, were the result of the imposition of English by the United States authorities as the official language of instruction.

Among the lectures Lloréns presented are "Los grandes amores del poeta Luis Lloréns Torres" (1959), "El humorismo, el epigrama y la sátira en la literatura puertorriqueña" (1960), "Hamlet visto por Hostos y Goethe" (1962), "Tres temas sobre Hostos" (1962), "Dos mujeres del Quijote" (1964), "Anatomía de un gramaticastro" (1967), "El habla popular de Puerto Rico" (1968), "Augusto Malaret: crítica a la crítica" (1972) and "La magia de la palabra" (1981).

He contributed to periodicals in Puerto Rico and beyond, such as El Imparcial, El Mundo, El Día, La Milagrosa, la Revista del Instituto de Cultura Puertorriqueña, Rumbos (Barcelona, Spain), ABC de España (Spain), Boletín de la Academia de Artes y Ciencias de Puerto Rico and "Prensa", of which he was a member of the editorial board and later (in 1963) became its manager, at a time when it was known as "Prensa Literaria: the official organ of the Puerto Rican Society of Journalists and Writers". For El Nuevo Día, he wrote a column called "Academo". He was also an advisor to the Revista de la Universidad Interamericana.

Washington Lloréns was a corresponding member of the Paraguayan Institute of Historic Research and the Real Academia Española (English: Royal Academy of the Spanish Language), a founding member of the Puerto Rican Academy of the Spanish Language and second vice president of the Puerto Rican Institute of Hispanic Culture. He was also president of the Institute of Puerto Rican Literature and the Puerto Rico Academy of Arts and Sciences.

== Death ==
He died in San Juan on 21 June 1989. He was 90 years old.

== Accolades ==
- In 1960, the Spanish government named him Commander of the Order of Civil Merit.
- Recipient of two awards from the Institute of Puerto Rican Culture (1956 and 1964)
- Received an honorary degree from Temple University for his contributions in the field of pharmacy.
- Recognized at Ponce's Tricentennial Park for his contributions in the field of literature.
- His 1954 short story "Montaña en flor" won a prize from the Coffee Producers Cooperative of Puerto Rico.

== Books by Washington Lloréns ==
The following are books written by Lloréns since 1960:

- Catorce pecados de humor y una vida descabellada (1959)
- El humorismo, el epigrama y la satira en la literatura puertorriqueña (1960)
- Comentarios a Refranes, modismos, locuciones de Coversao en el Batey de Ernesto Juan Fonfrias (Club de la Prensa, 1956) (1962)
- Dos mujeres del Quijote: la mujer de Sancho, Maritornes (1964)
- El habla popular de Puerto Rico (1968)
- Transculturacion en Puerto Rico (1969)
- Diez pecados de humor (1977)

== See also ==
- List of Puerto Rican writers
- List of Puerto Ricans
- Puerto Rican literature
- People from Ponce, Puerto Rico
