= Plaza del Quinto Centenario =

Square in San Juan, Puerto Rico

Coordinates: 18°28′05″N 66°07′09″W

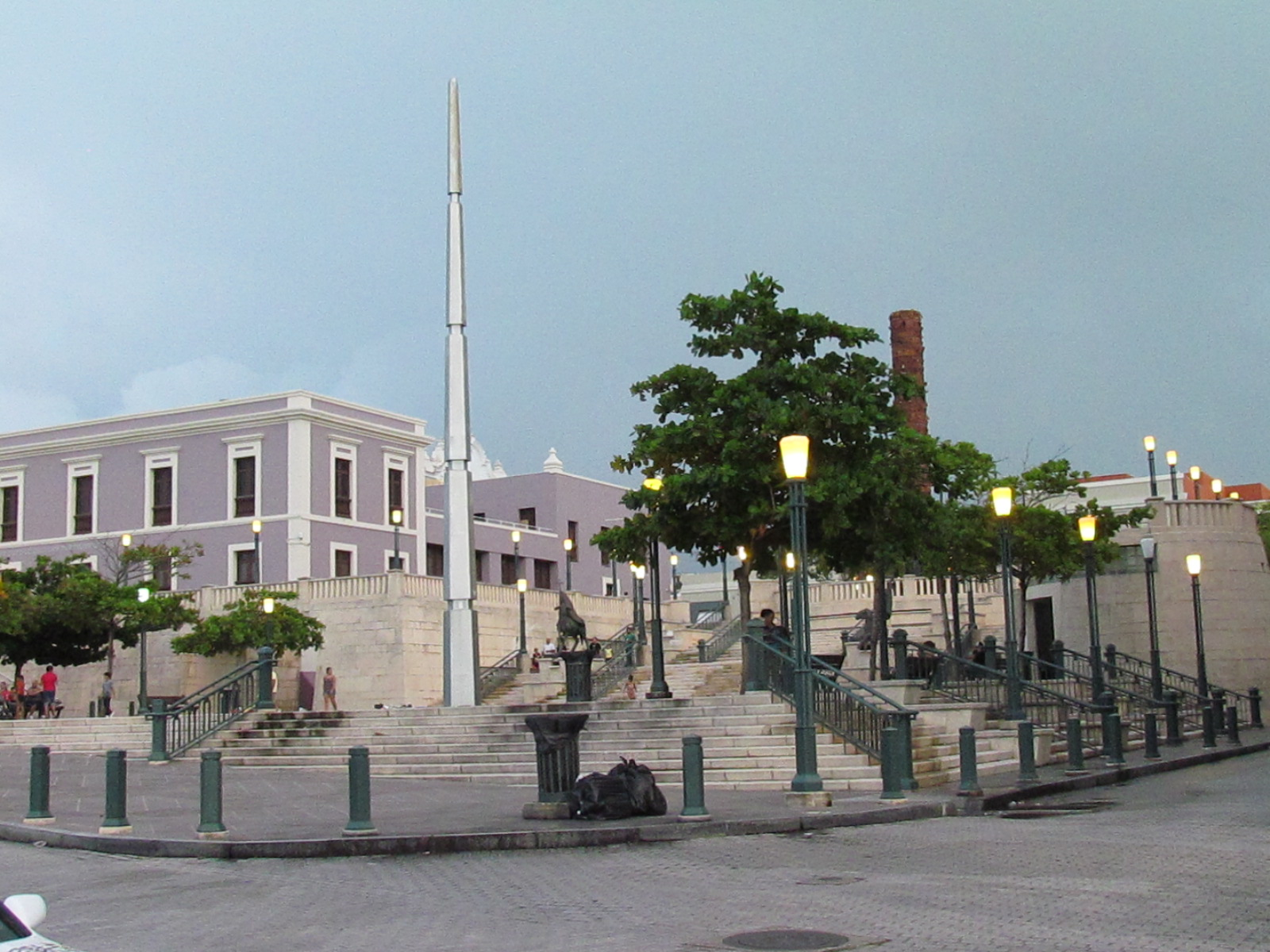
Plaza del Quinto Centenario in 2011

Plaza del Quinto Centenario (Spanish for 'Square of the Fifth Centenary'), also Plaza del V Centenario, popularly referred to as Plaza del Tótem ('Totem Square'), is a modern square in Old San Juan, Puerto Rico, inaugurated in 1992 to commemorate the 500th anniversary of the European discovery and Spanish conquest of Puerto Rico and the Americas and the first European settlement of San Juan. The square is located between the Ballajá and Mercado neighborhoods of the San Juan Antiguo barrio of San Juan, Puerto Rico. It is located next to the Ballajá Barracks, the Puerto Rican National Gallery and the San José Church, close to El Morro and the San Juan National Historic Site.

== History ==
At the time of the Spanish settlement of San Juan, the site of the Plaza del Quinto Centenario originally belonged to the Catholic Dominican Order, which established a monastery during the 16th century. The main structure of the monastery still stands today, and it serves as the headquarters of the National Gallery operated by the Institute of Puerto Rican Culture. Throughout the 19th century, the lot was owned by the Spanish Army, which established the Ballajá Barracks, and later during the first half of the 20th century it was home to the US Army's Fort Brooke. The site and its surrounding buildings were abandoned during the second half of the 20th century, and by the late 1960s the entire area was in a rapid state of urban decay. After the institution of the San Juan National Historic Site as a UNESCO World Heritage Site in 1983, and in an attempt to revitalize the area in 1986, the Puerto Rico State Office of Historic Preservation began a series of projects aimed at restoring the historic heritage of the neighborhood and reviving the economic, cultural and tourism industries in the area.

As its current name describes, the modern square was built and finished in 1992 in time for the celebration of the 5th centenary (500th anniversary) of the European discovery of Puerto Rico and the Americas, during a period of extensive renovation and redevelopment of the Ballajá neighborhood along other important historic sites in Old San Juan. The square hosted a series of cultural programs including traditional arts and crafts, cultural performances and a carnival. It also hosted the Puerto Rico Symphony Orchestra, and a celebratory concert honoring Puerto Rican composer Rafael Hernández Marín, and other important figures of the cultural history of Puerto Rico. Some of the musical performers included Rocío Jurado, José Feliciano, Celia Cruz, Ruth Fernandez, Ednita Nazario and Danny Rivera.

The Plaza del Quinto Centenario today is one of the main staging locations for the annual San Sebastián Street Festival during the month of January. The square was also the site for the celebration of the 500th anniversary of the official founding of the city of San Juan on September 12 of 2022, officiated by Mayor Miguel Romero Lugo.

== Description ==
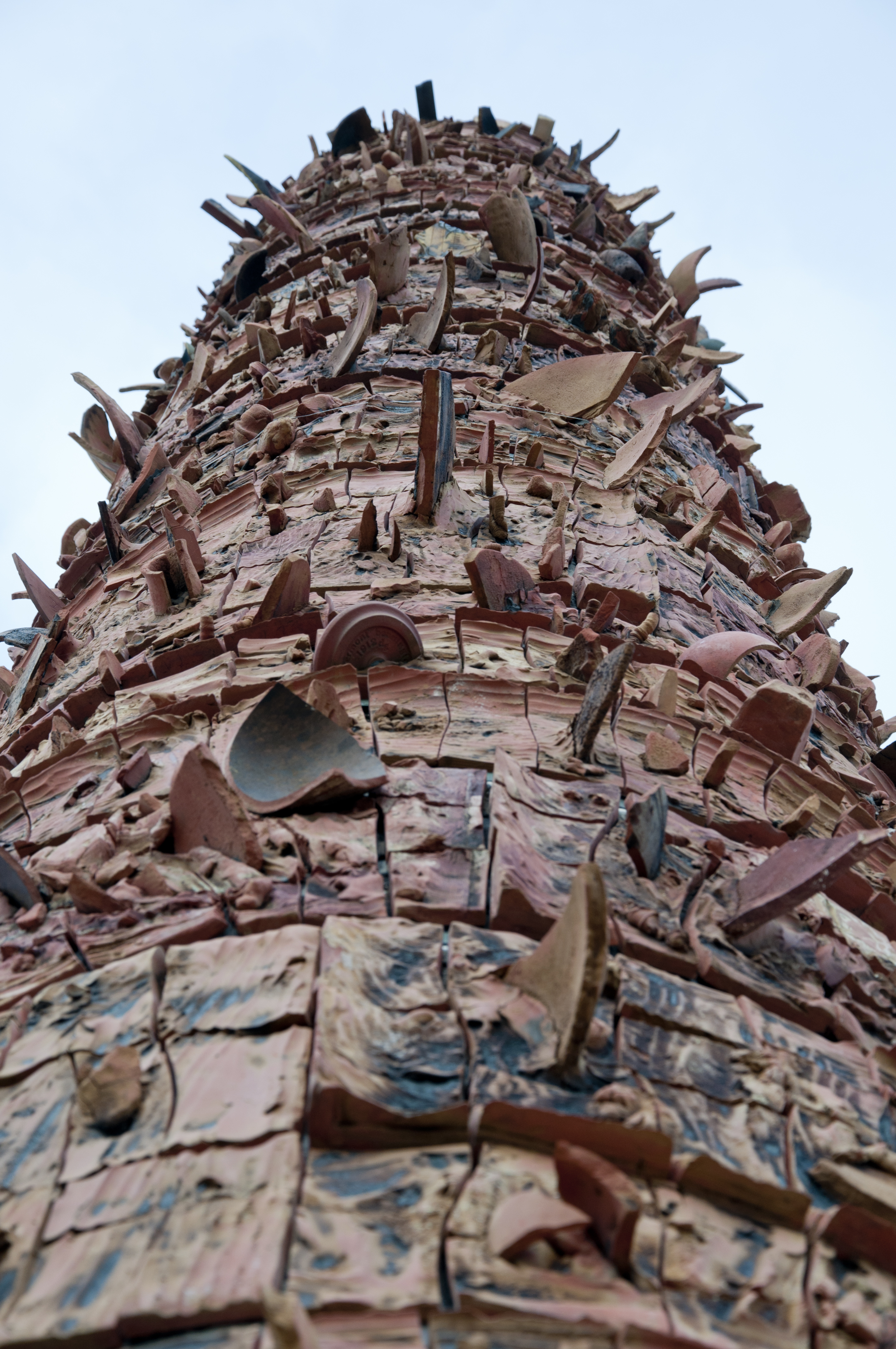
Close-up of the Tótem telúrico by ceramist Jaime Suárez.

The main feature of the square is the 'Teluric Totem' (Tótem Telúrico), which lends its name to the Plaza del Tótem ('Totem Square'), the name popularly and locally used for the Plaza del Quinto Centenario. The "totem" is actually an art sculpture created by Puerto Rican ceramist Jaime Suárez, and it is made from broken fragments of ceramic vases and other types of clay pottery from the Americas, which allude to the pottery fragments of the indigenous Taino found in archaeological sites throughout Puerto Rico. As such, this sculpture represents the historic but violent first meeting between the original native inhabitants of Puerto Rico and the European colonizers. The totem has a base or pedestal built from black granite, and the entire sculpture rises to 40 feet (12 m) in height. The square at the base of the totem portrays a wind rose pointing at the cardinal directions. A similar sculpture by the same artist can be found in front of the Federico Degetau Federal Building in Hato Rey.

The square is bound by sculptures representing the Agnus Dei, and the Lamb of God, one of the symbols of San Juan and the main feature of the escutcheon of the coat of arms of Puerto Rico. The art designs and steps setup, and their arrangement in the square, represent the 500-year history period of the history of Puerto Rico since the European settlement in 1492, and each level of the square represents a centennial or 100 years in the history of the island. The southern end of the square is also marked by needle-shaped columns which point towards the North Star. The Plaza del Quinto Centenario is bound by Norzagaray Street to the north, del Cristo Street to the east, Dr. Francisco Rufino de Goenaga Street to the south, and Morovis Street to the west, and it hosts an extensive parking garage underground.

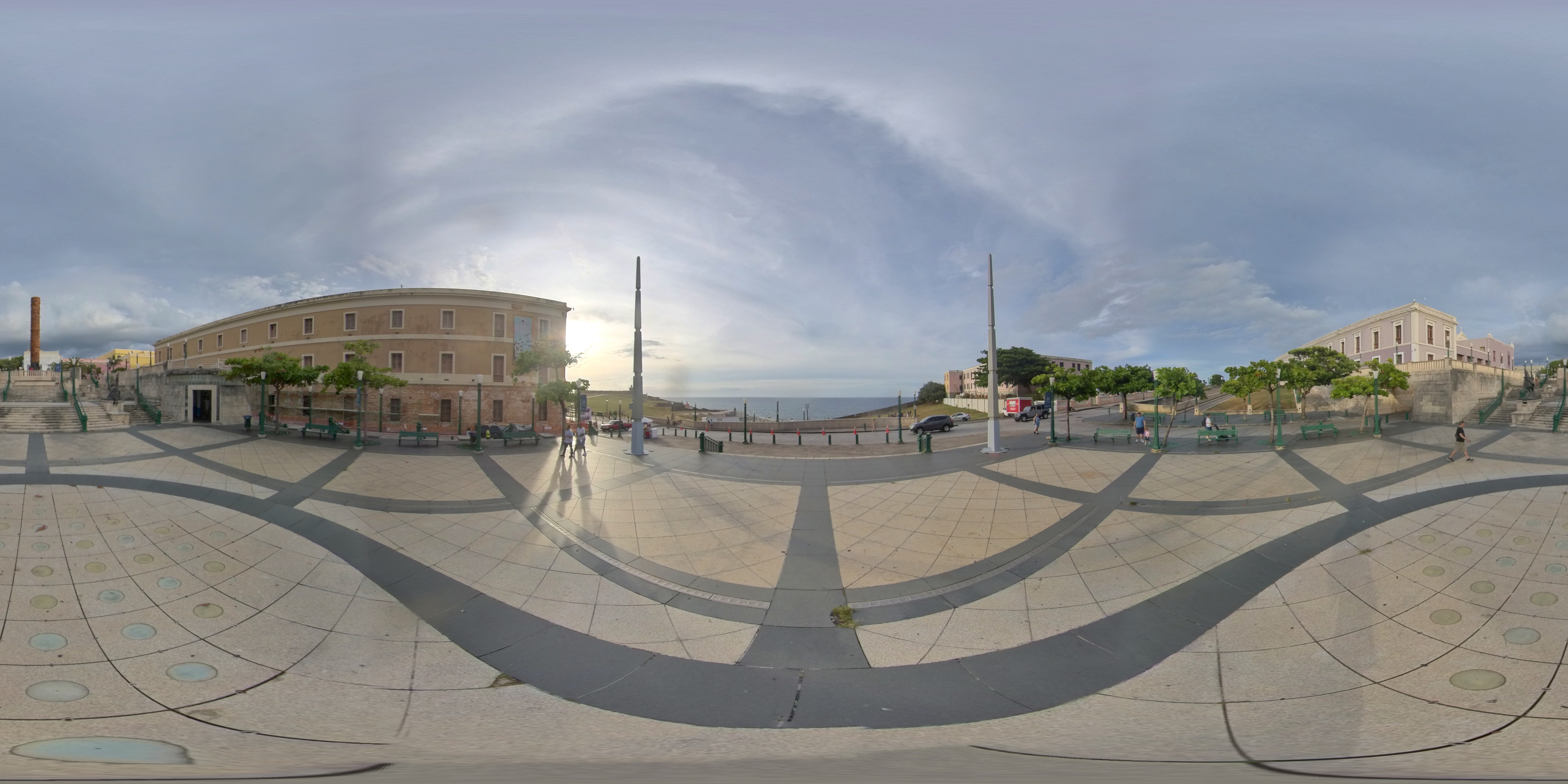
Panoramic view of the square (June 2022)

== Gallery ==
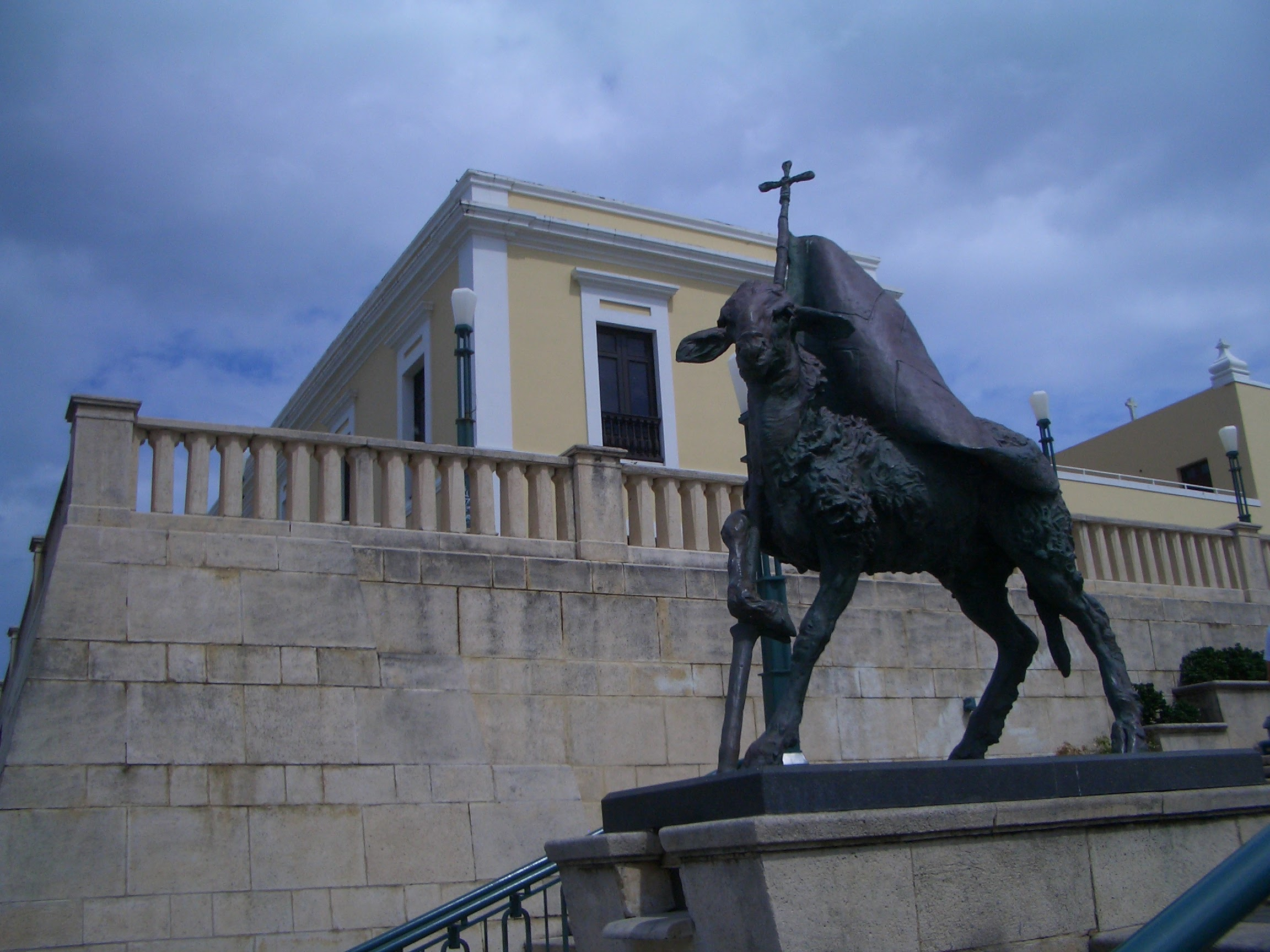

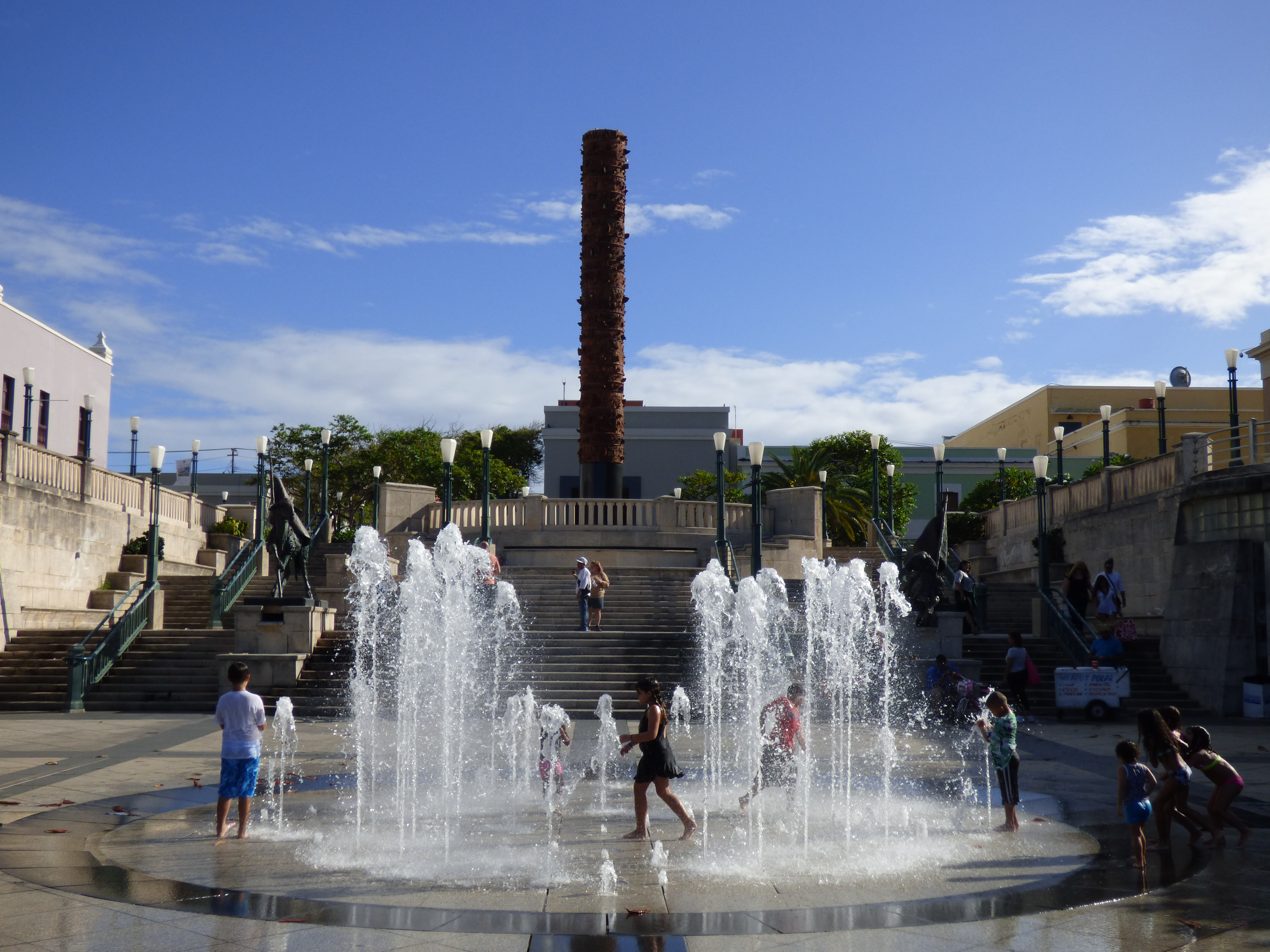

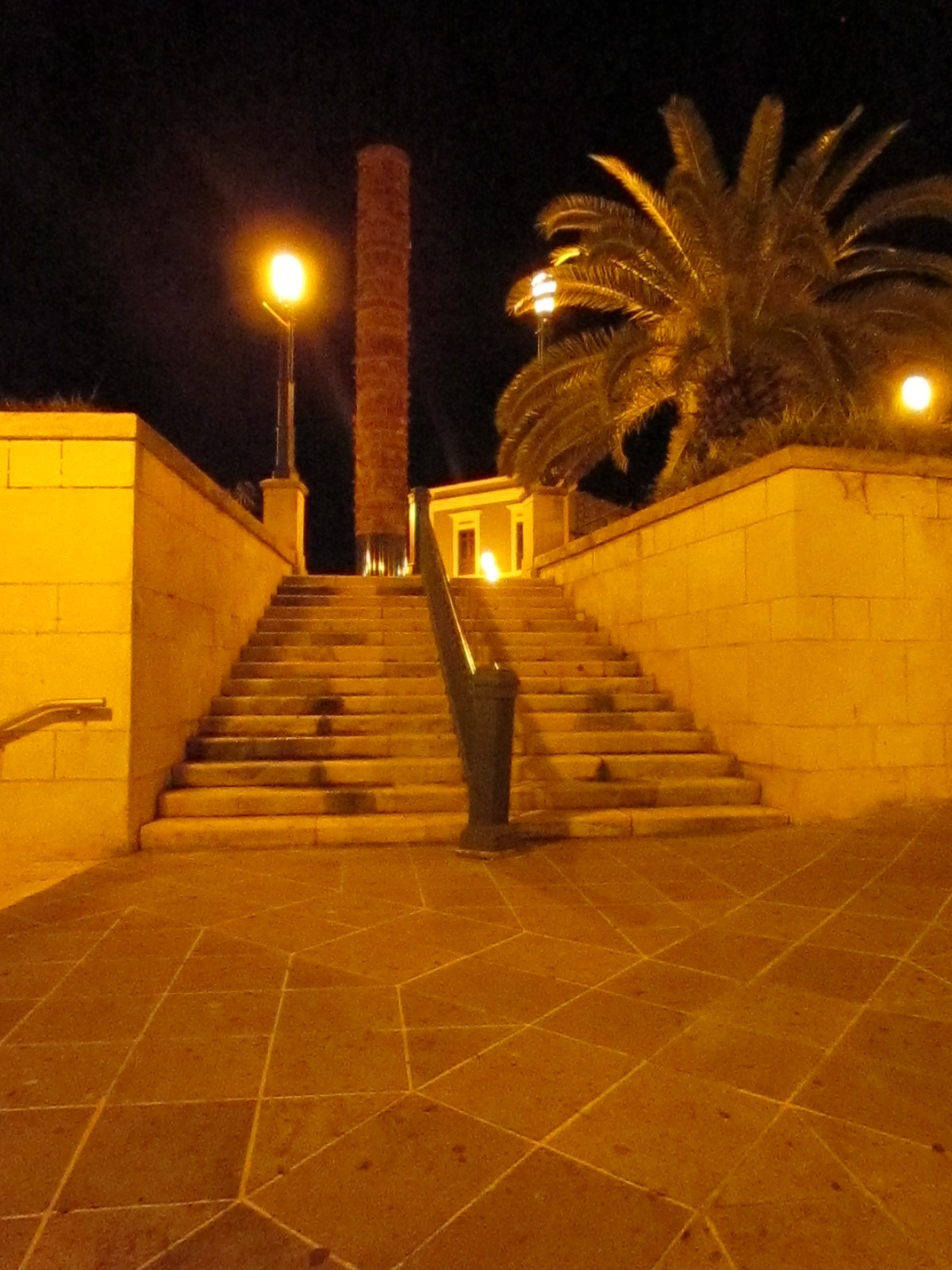

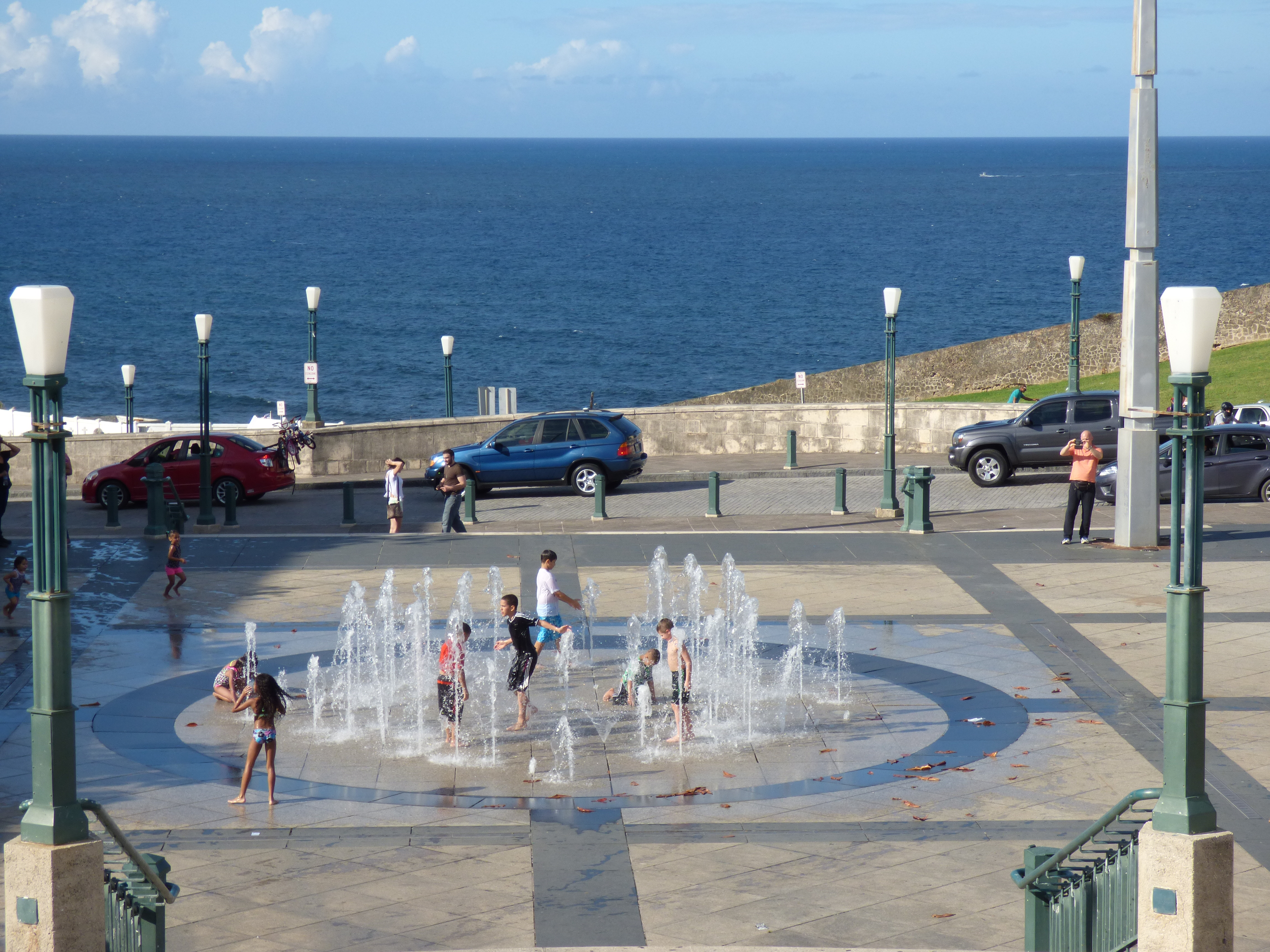

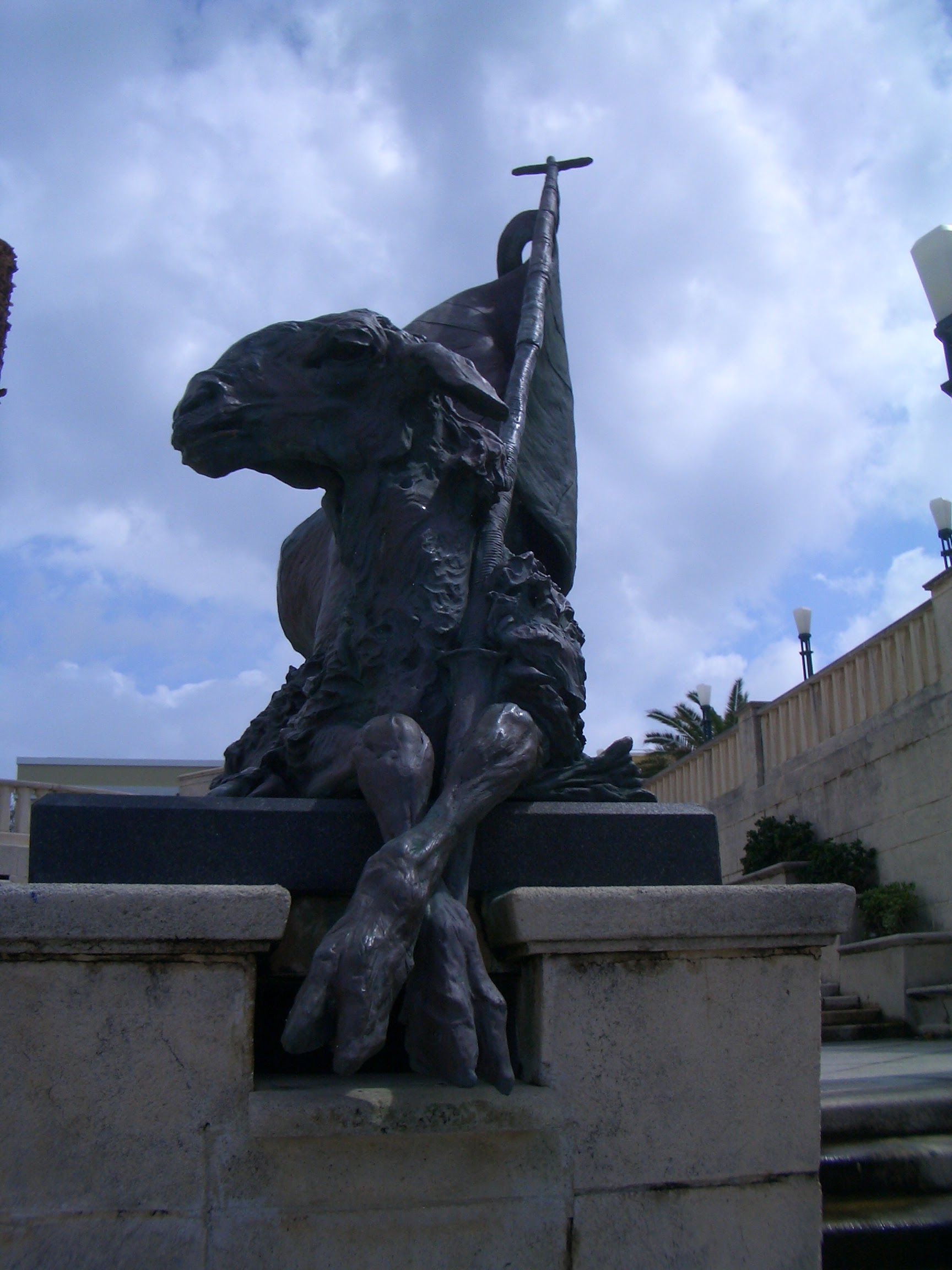
