= List of Puerto Rican slang words and phrases =

This article is a summary of common slang words and phrases used in Puerto Rico. Idiomatic expressions may be difficult to translate fully and may have multiple meanings, so the English translations below may not reflect the full meaning of the expression they intend to translate. This is a short list and more may be found on the Academia Puertorriqueña de la Lengua Española website.

== List ==
ataque de nervios
a sudden nervous reaction, similar to hysterics, or losing control, experienced in response to something.
¡Bendito!
variants are ¡Ay bendito! and dito - “aww poor you” or “oh my God”; “ay” meaning lament, and “bendito” meaning blessed.
abombao / abombá
referring to food; rotten or damaged.
al garete
wild, off the rails, disastrous. Doing something rash. Comes from the Arabic phrase meaning "adrift" (Arabic: على غير هدى (/ʕa.'laː.ɣajr.'hu.dan/), romanized: ealaa ghayr hudaa).
asicalao
flawless, clean, immaculate. From standard Spanish acicalado.
bembé
a big party.
bichote
important person. From English big shot.
birras
beer.
bochinche
gossip.
boricua
the name given to Puerto Rico people based on the Taíno name for the island.
bregar
to work on a task, to do something with effort and dedication.
broki
brother or friend.
cafre
a lowlife. Comes from Arabic (Arabic: كافر (/kafir), romanized: Kafir).
cangri
a badass, hunk or hottie. An influential person. From English congressman.
cariduro
person who should be ashamed of their actions but isn't; a stubborn person.
chacho
short for muchacho - Guy, male.
chavo

in Mexico this can mean dude or guy relating to someone younger, but in Puerto Rican slang it is used in replacement of money (dinero).

chulería
while in other countries this word means "insolence", in Puerto Rico it has an entirely different meaning and is used to describe that something is good, fun, funny, great or beautiful.
corillo
friend, or group of friends.
dura
normally means “hard”, but in Puerto Rican slang means that someone is really good at what they do.
embustería
series of lies, something that is completely false, a "pack of lies".
¡Fo!
literally translates to "eww!" or "yuck!" it is often used as an exclamation in reaction to a bad smell.
fregao, fregá
a shameless person.

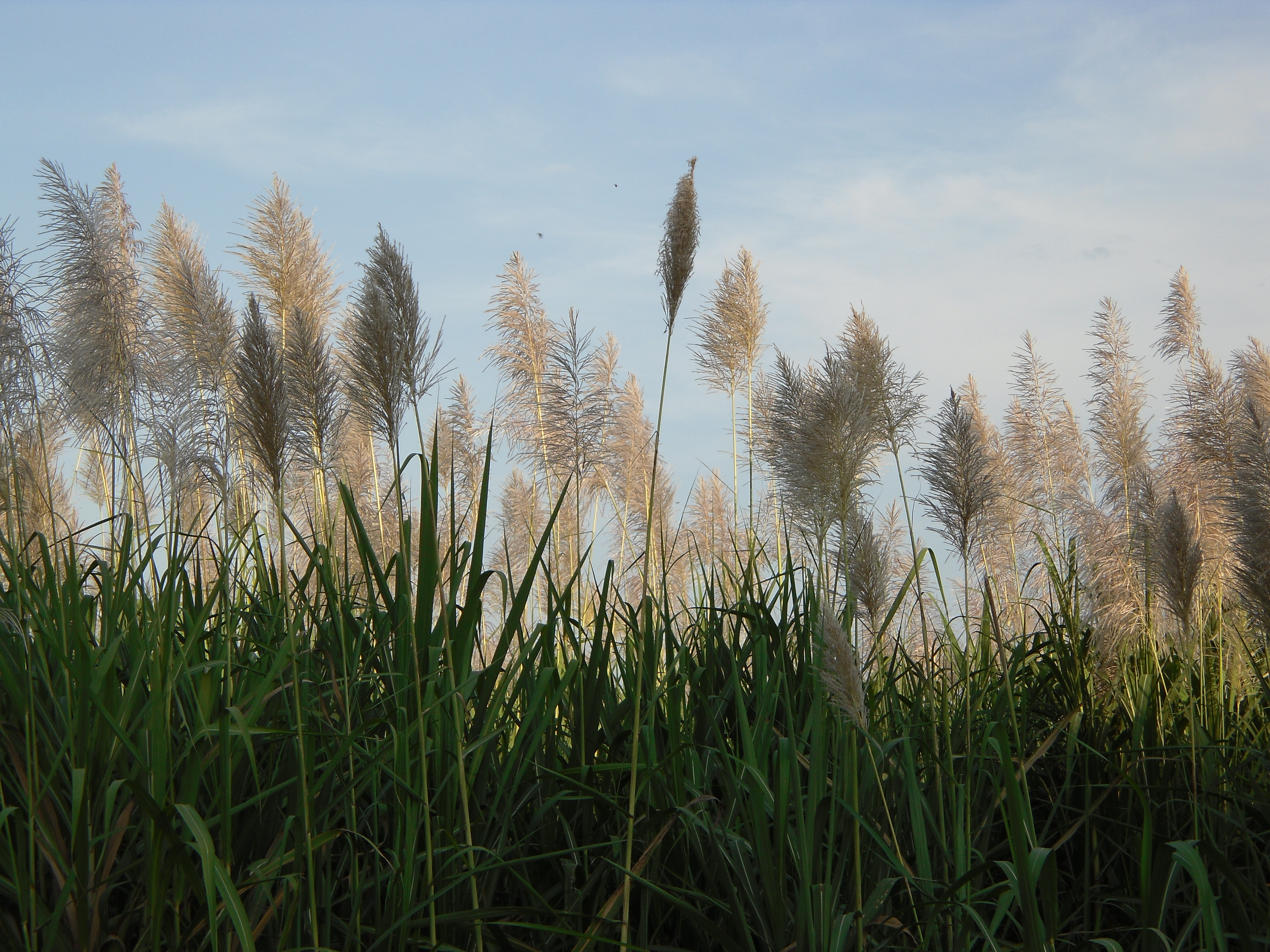
guajana is the "flower" of the sugarcane

guajana
The flower of the sugarcane.
guinda
a steep slope.
gufear
to act goofy.
janguear
“to hang out”. Comes from the American expression “hang out”.
jartera
to be full.
jevo/a
boyfriend / girlfriend.
jíbaro
A person who lives in the countryside, mountain people, the agricultural worker, who cuts sugarcane, for example. From a Taino compound word ("Jiba" meaning mountain or forest, and "iro" meaning man or men) though commonly mistaken for originating from the Arabic (Mofarite Arabic: جبري (Jabre), romanized: Jabre), in the Mofarite related Ethiopian Semitic languages ገበሬ(Gabre), romanized: Gabre).
jumeta
drunk.

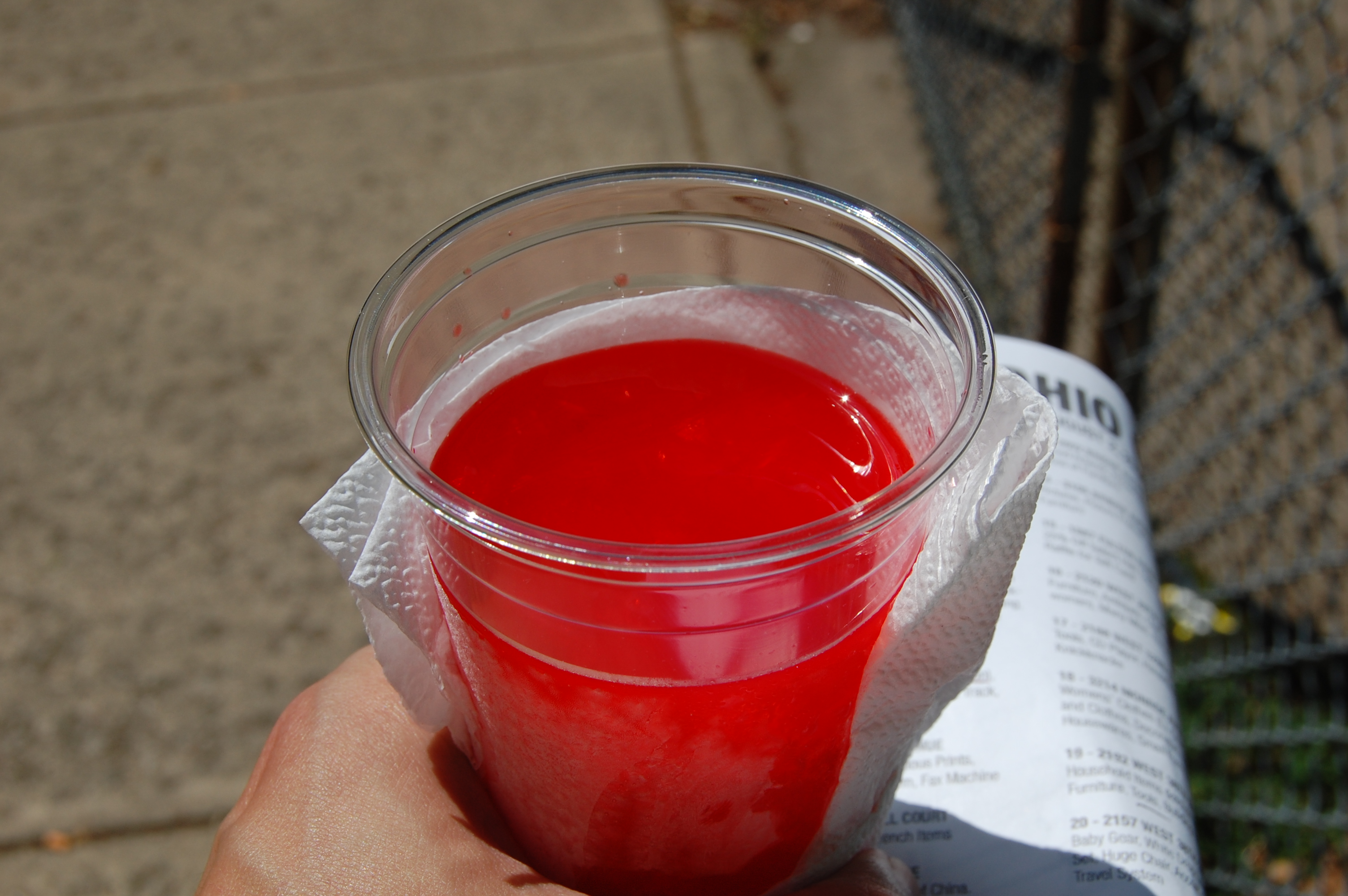
Cold cherry limber

lambeojo
lackey, brownoser, toady, sycophant.
ligar
to peep.
ligón
a Peeping Tom.
limber
also "limbel". A home-made flavored frozen treat usually made from natural fruits or sweet milk mixtures and often served on a small piece of water-resistant paper, a plastic or paper cup, or a popsicle stick. The name is said to have originated from the last name of Charles Lindbergh after the islanders noticed how "awfully cold as ice" he was as compared to the warmth of the locals during Lindbergh's visit to the Island in 1928.
mamey
used when referring to something that is easy to do.
mami, papi
terms of endearment; mami when referring to a cute woman, papi when referring to a handsome man, or to address a lover
nene, nena
boy/girl In standard Spanish it means "niño/niña".
pana
friend / buddy. "Pana" is also a name for breadfruit in Puerto Rico. From "partner".
pasárselas con la cuchara ancha
to get away with murder, or to get away with it.
perreo, perrear
a way of dancing ("grinding") or a danceable song.
pichea
“forget about that”, disregard.
por encima de los gandules
expression of admiration, to say that something is outstanding or beyond good.
revolú
used to describe chaotic situations.
servirse con la cuchara grande
to get away with murder, or to get away with it.
soplapote
a nobody, or a worker low on the hierarchy, or an enabler.
tapón
a traffic jam. In standard Spanish, "a bottle top" or "a clog".
tráfala
a lowlife.
wepa

typically used at parties, dances, or general hype events to express of joy or excitement, hence the direct translation "That's awesome!".

== See also ==
- Puerto Rican Spanish
- Spanish dialects and varieties
