= Fort Brooke, Puerto Rico =

United States Army military post established in 1943

Coordinates: 18°28′15″N 66°7′27″W

Fort Brooke
- Old San Juan, Puerto Rico

Site information
- Type: U.S. Army Post 851
- Controlled by: United States

Garrison information
- Garrison: DEML DETACHMENT

Fort Brooke was a United States Army post established on 3 March 1943 under General Order Number 10 during World War II after the German U-boat attacks of 1942 on the Caribbean Basin in conjunction to Operation Z.

== Early years ==
During the early years, Puerto Rico played a leading role as the operations center in the Antilles Screen against German U-boats, whose attacks reached an alarming peak in 1942 with the sinking of 336 ships in the Caribbean area. Ships sailing from South American ports carried such strategic products as gasoline, oil derivatives, and bauxite for aluminum production, and their losses were serious. Puerto Rico provided support for U.S. naval forces charged with controlling the Caribbean; it served as a base for air protection for ships, other outposts in the region, and the approaches to the Panama Canal; and it was an important link in the transport and ferrying route for aircraft, personnel, and cargo going to Africa and Middle East.

In May 1942, U-boats sunk 56 ships totaling more than 248,000 tons of shipment in the space of 4 months all throughout the Caribbean Sea Frontier west of the shipping control line. By the middle of the month, 22% of the bauxite fleet had been destroyed, 20% of the ships in the Puerto Rican run had been lost, and of 74 vessels allocated to the Army for the month of 17 July had already been sunk.

== Formation ==
Anxious at the beginning of World War II to avoid raising fears of the U.S. expansion in the hemisphere through the creation of military bases in Latin America, President Roosevelt concentrated instead on strengthening defenses at both ends of the U.S. Canal Zone, and establishing an air base and other military installations on the island of Puerto Rico, the major U.S. territory in the Caribbean Basin.

In the President's opinion, expressed in a bill that failed to pass in the U.S. Senate in 1943, the chain of islands running in a great arc from New Orleans to the shoulder of South America, enclosing the Caribbean Basin, formed a vast natural shield for the Panama Canal, suited in distance and conformation to the uses of the military plane. And of this island shield, Puerto Rico is the center.

== Order 10 ==
General Order No. 10 read:

The Headland Castle at Old San Juan will be named Fort Brooke in memory of United States Army Major General John Rutter Brooke from Pennsylvania, better known as "John Ruller" during the American Civil War between 1861 and 1865 and the Spanish–American War of 1898.

== Description ==
Fort Brooke was located in Fort San Felipe del Morro, a Spanish colonial fort. It consisted of offices for technicians, observers, military staff and police, music band members, motor pool workers and medical personnel. Officers' quarters were constructed along the road leading to the Castle surrounded by an Officers' Club, one swimming pool, the Bachelor Officers' Quarters (BOQ) and one outdoor cinema on top of a golf course. Observation posts, communications centers and underground installations were also added in the sector.

Due to declining maritime losses in the Atlantic as the war progressed, the base saw little action in the later war years, and became home to a number of sporting and leisure activities.

== Transformation into a hospital ==
On 31 August 1944, the United States Department of War issued General Order No. 71 which transformed the Ballajá station into the Fort Brooke Hospital installation.

== Armed Forces Examination and Induction Station ==
Puerto Ricans drafted to the United States Armed Forces during the Korean War and the Vietnam War reported to the Armed Forces Examination and Induction Station (AFEIS) at Fort Brooke for screens and processes before being sent to active duty. In 1970 Armed Forces Examination and Induction Station at Fort Brooke was redesignated as the Armed Forces Examining and Entrance Station. In 1978 the station moved to a new facility in Guaynabo, Puerto Rico near the Fort Buchanan Army base and became a Military Entrance Processing Station (MEPS). On 1 January 1982, the center was redesignated as MEPS San Juan. In 2013 the Military Entrance Processing Station moved to a new location at Millennium Park Plaza in Guaynabo.

== See also ==
- Military history of Puerto Rico
- Henry Barracks, Puerto Rico
