= Museo de las Américas =

Museum in San Juan, Puerto Rico

Coordinates: 18.4677°N 66.1201°W

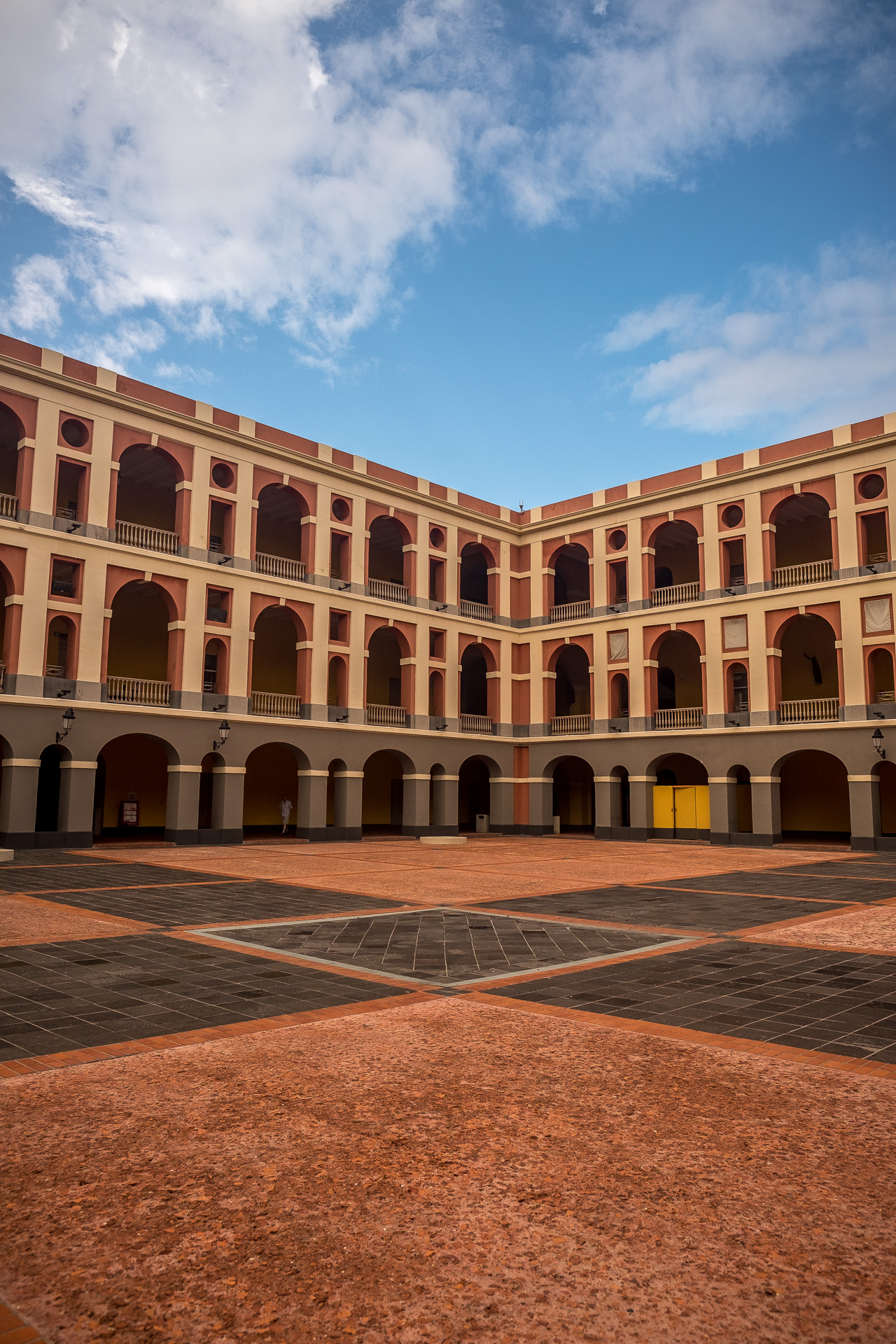
Ballajá Barracks, Museo de las Americas

Museo de las Américas is a multidisciplinary museum in San Juan, Puerto Rico dedicated to the arts, folklore, architecture and broader history of the Americas. Its mission is to offer a synoptic view of the history and culture of the Americas from ancient to contemporary, emphasizing in Puerto Rico and its relationship to the continent, through exhibition programs and cultural activities.

Founded in 1992 by Ricardo Enrique Alegría Gallardo, a professor at the Universidad de Puerto Rico and founder of the Institute of Puerto Rican Culture, the museum is dedicated to its role in preserving and perpetuating Puerto Rican arts and culture, both within the territory and abroad. Among its temporary exhibitions, the museum has four permanent exhibitions: The Popular Arts in the Americas, The African Heritage, The Indigenous of America and Conquest and Colonization: Birth and Evolution of the Puerto Rican Nation. Museo de Las Americas is a multidisciplinary, multicultural and multidimensional learning museum, responding to a diverse community, which allows it to consolidate itself as a cutting-edge institution in Puerto Rico.

It is currently housed in the former Ballajá Barracks, built between 1854 and 1864 as one of the last major architectural projects of the Spanish colonial rule over the island before it was annexed by the United States in 1898. Initially, when Puerto Rico was annexed by the United States, the federal government paid the Catholic Church for this property, among others in the area. Ownership of the property, claimed by the Catholic Church, was not a straightforward matter and had to be resolved by the Supreme Court.

The Government of Puerto Rico acquired the building in 1976 through a transfer from the Government of the United States with the commitment of restoring it and using it for cultural, educative, and touristic purposes. In 1986, a reform plan for the San Juan Historic Zone was sketched and the building was restored from 1990 to 1993.
