= Ballajá, Old San Juan =

Subbarrio of San Juan Antiguo in Puerto Rico

Ballajá
- Subbarrio
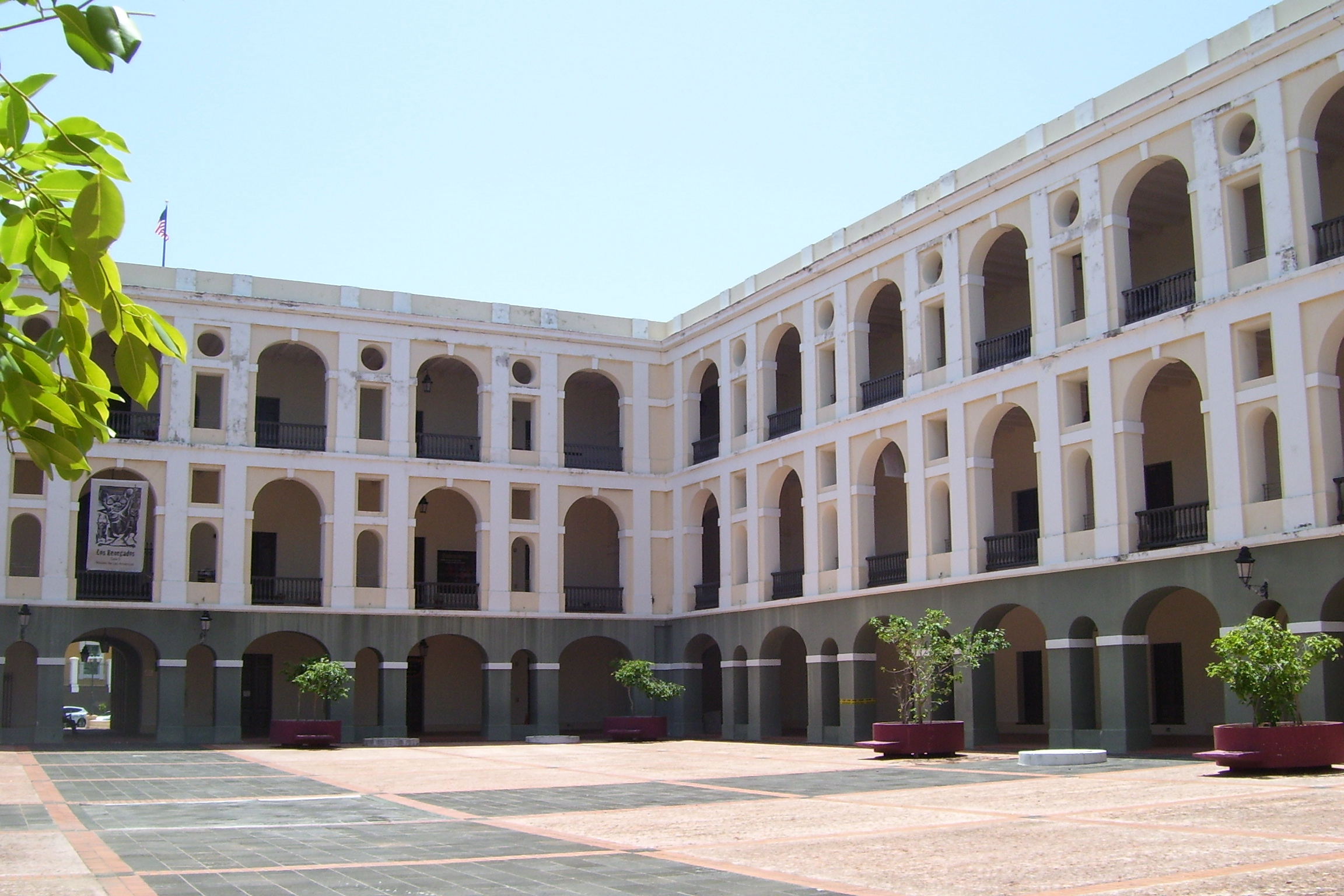
- The historic Ballajá Barracks

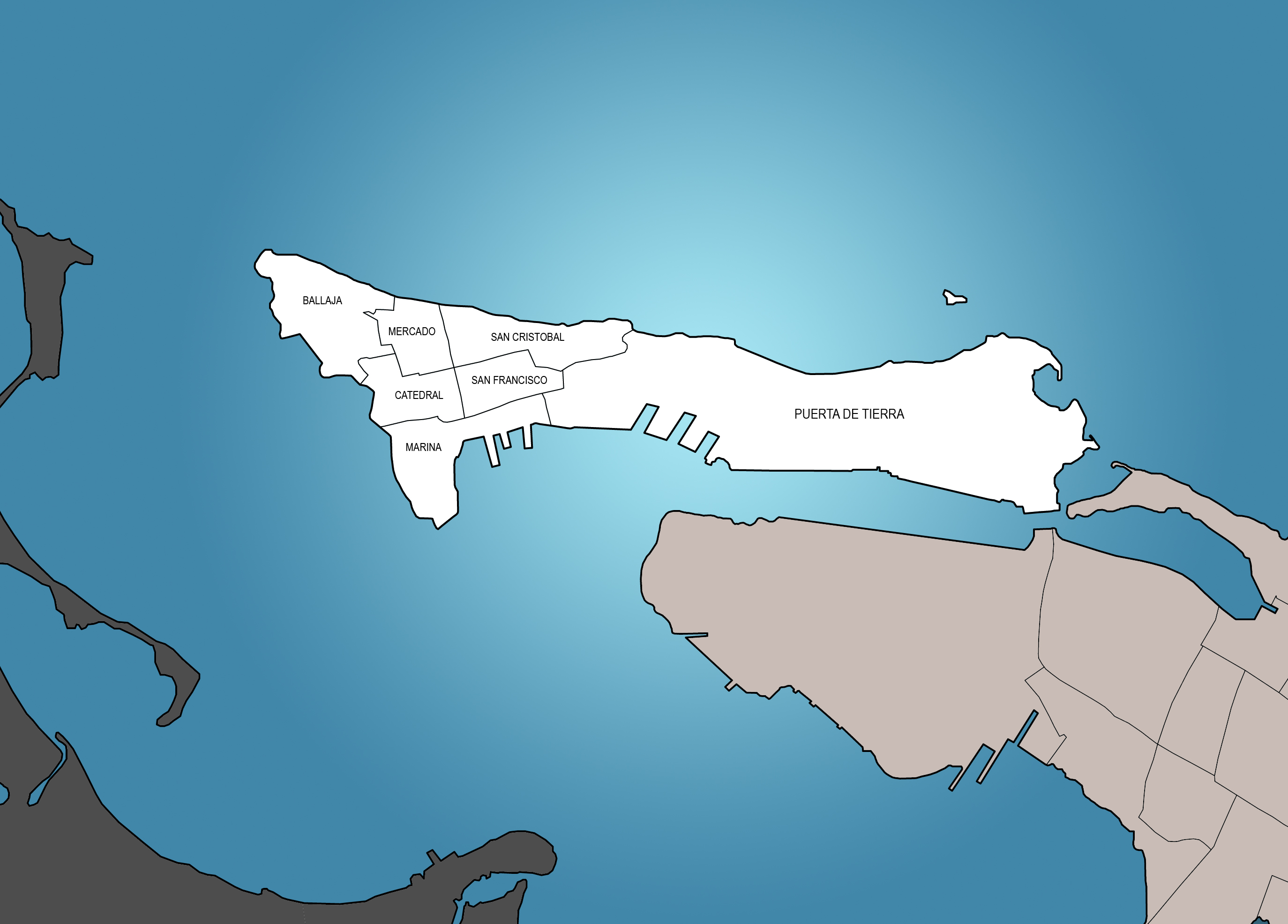
- Ballajá is in San Juan Antiguo

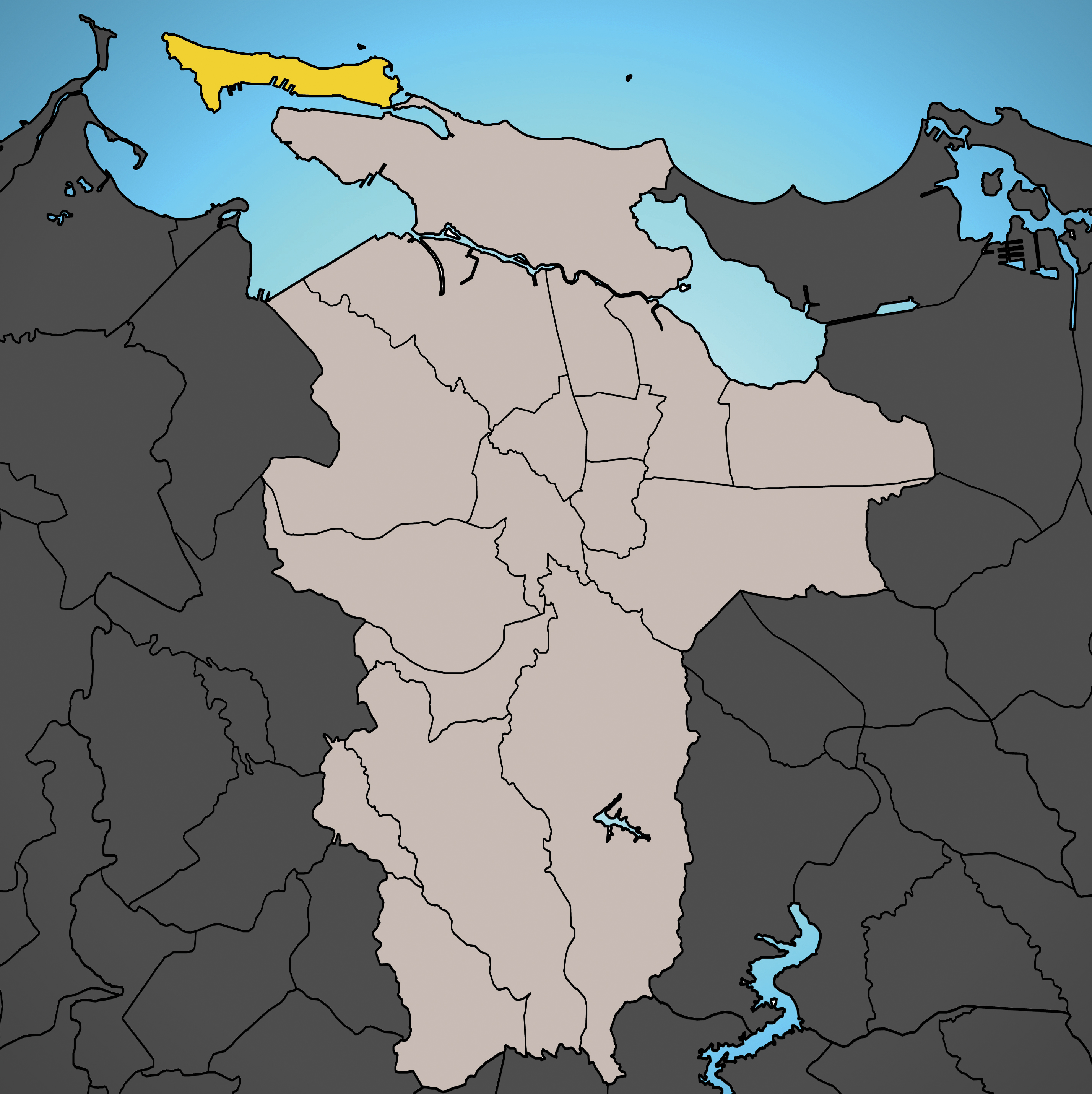
- San Juan Antiguo is in San Juan

- San Juan is in Puerto Rico
- Coordinates: 18.4706129°N 66.1245620°W
- Commonwealth: Puerto Rico
- Municipality: San Juan
- Barrio: San Juan Antiguo
- Website: http://www.ballaja.com/

Ballajá is one of 7 subbarrios of San Juan Antiguo barrio in the municipality of San Juan in Puerto Rico. Ballajá is one of the six subbarrios which form part of the Old San Juan Historic District. This subdistrict is named after the historic Ballajá Barracks (Spanish: Cuartel de Ballajá), which now house the Museum of the Americas.

== History ==
The urban development of the Ballajá subbarrio is closely linked to the development of El Morro Castle, first established in 1539 as a fortified watchtower on a promontory of the same name located at the northwestern most point of the Isleta de San Juan. During this time, the area of Ballajá was located just outside of the urban core of Old San Juan and, due to its military purpose, it was the location of various barracks, armories and munition warehouses. The area was first referred to as Ballajá in 1845, when it was one of the five barrios of the city of San Juan before the annexation of Santurce and Río Piedras. The modern iteration of the Ballajá Barracks, the namesake of the subbarrio, were built shortly after its establishment between 1854 and 1864. This military building represents the last large-scale project edified by the Spanish Crown in the Americas.

The subbarrio was heavily affected during the Battle of San Juan of the Spanish–American War, with the barracks suffering structural damages during the American bombing of the city under Admiral William T. Sampson. Puerto Rico was ceded by Spain in the aftermath of the Spanish–American War under the terms of the Treaty of Paris of 1898 and became an unincorporated territory of the United States. In 1899, the United States Department of War conducted a census of Puerto Rico finding that the population of Ballajá was 1,217.

In the aftermath of the Spanish–American War and throughout the 20th-century, the subbarrio suffered from urban blight, with many of its historic monuments being left to decay. This changed through the establishment of the San Juan National Historic Site and World Heritage Site, with the site of El Morro Castle and its surroundings being revitalized not only for its historic value but for tourism purposes too. Various urban projects were also enacted throughout the second half of the 20th century, particularly in preparation for the fifth centenary celebrations of the European settlement of Puerto Rico and the Americas, with public squares such as the Plaza del Quinto Centenario.

== Cityscape ==
The subbarrio is centered around its namesake, the Ballajá Barracks. Most of its land area, however, consists of El Morro Esplanade, a large tract of grass located in the San Juan National Historic Site.

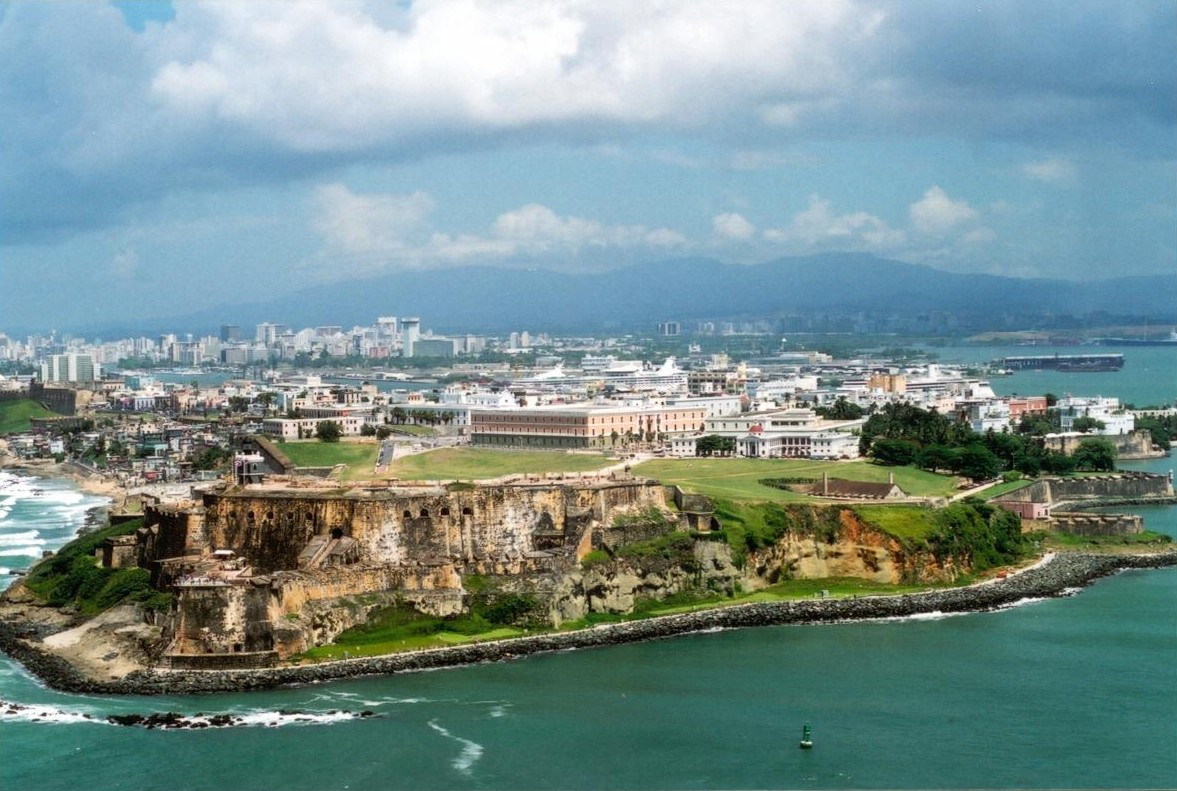
Aerial view of the northwest tip of San Juan Antiguo

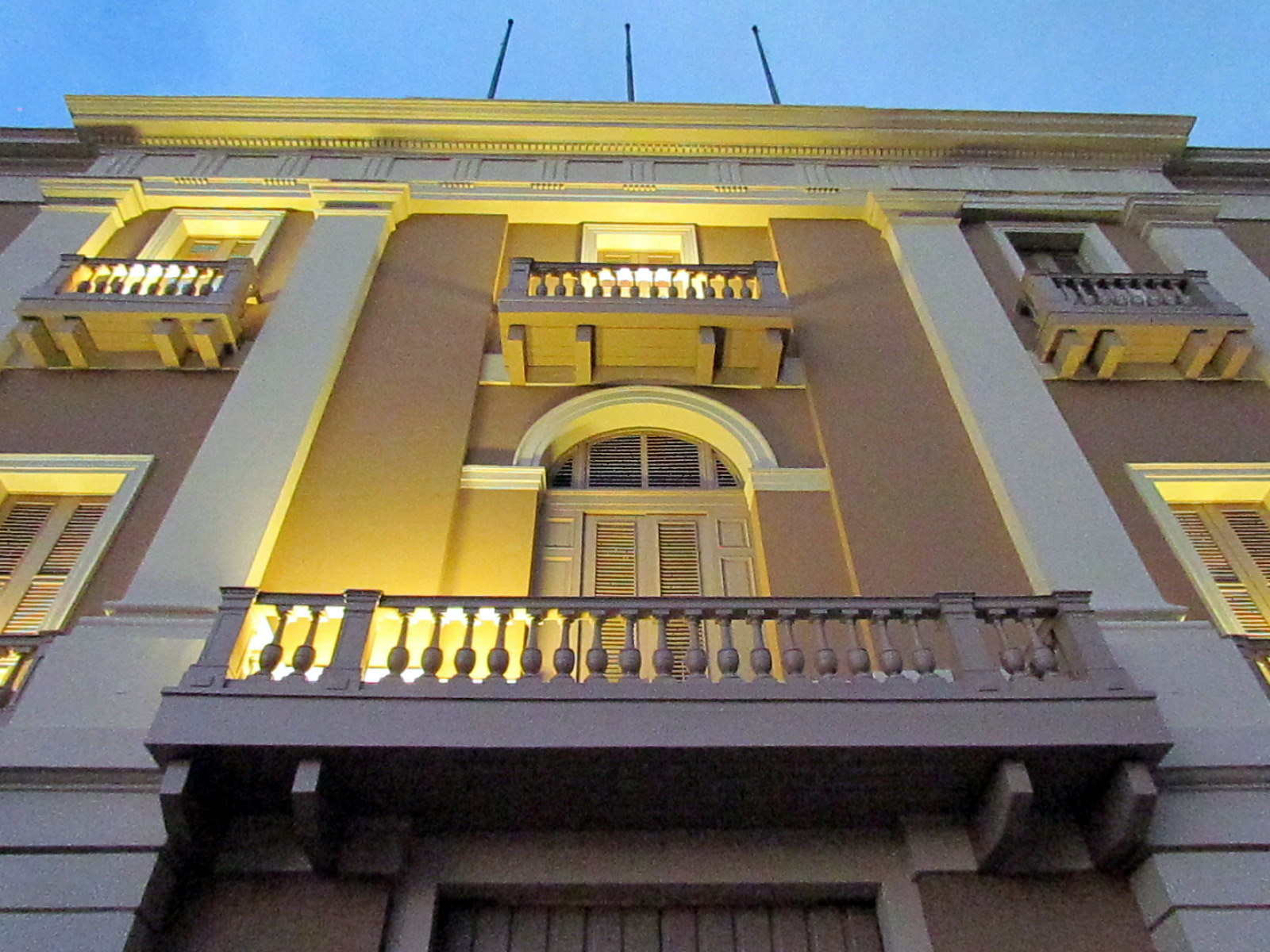
Ballajá Barracks

=== Places of interest ===
- Ballajá Barracks
  - Museo de las Américas
- Casa Blanca
- Casa Rosa
- Institute of Puerto Rican Culture Headquarters
- Puerto Rico School of Plastic Arts and Design
- San Juan National Historic Site
  - Castillo San Felipe del Morro
  - Paseo del Morro
- Santa María Magdalena de Pazzis Cemetery

=== Main streets and squares ===
- Morovis Street
- Norzagaray Street
- Plaza de la Beneficencia
- Plaza del Quinto Centenario

== Demographics ==
Historical population
Census	Pop.	Note	%±
1900	1,217		—
1910	1,406		15.5%
1920	1,680		19.5%
1930	1,086		−35.4%
1940	1,086		0.0%
1950	991		−8.7%
1980	0		—
1990	234		—
2000	8		−96.6%
2010	219		2,637.5%
U.S. Decennial Census; 1900 (uses 1899 data) 1910-1930; 1930-1950 1980-2000 2010
