= Academia Puertorriqueña de la Lengua Española =

Puerto Rican language regulator of Spanish

Coordinates: 18.467986°N 66.120110°W

Academia Puertorriqueña de la Lengua Española Puerto Rican Academy of the Spanish Language
- Academia Puertorriqueña de la Lengua Española
- Abbreviation: APLE
- Pronunciation: a.kaˈðe.mja pweɾ.to.riˈke.ɲa ðe la ˈleŋ.gwa es.paˈɲo.la
- Named after: The Royal Spanish Academy
- Predecessor: José de Diego's Antillean Academy of the Language (1916)
- Formation: 28 January 1955; 71 years ago
- Founders: Samuel R. Quiñones and José A. Balseiro
- Founded at: The Puerto Rican Athenaeum
- Registration no.: 10383
- Purpose: Promote the correct use, conservation and study of Spanish in the context of the country's cultural history, from its origins to its most recent manifestations, and internationally represent Puerto Rico before the sister Academies.
- Headquarters: Ballajá Barracks, Ballajá, Old San Juan, San Juan, Puerto Rico
- Location: San Juan, Puerto Rico
- Region served: Puerto Rico
- Members: 35 Founders (1955)
- Official language: Spanish
- Director: José Luis Vega
- Board of directors: Junta de Directores (English: "Board of Directors")
- Main organ: Full Members of the Academy
- Subsidiaries: Friends of the Puerto Rican Academy of the Spanish Language Foundation
- Affiliations: Association of Spanish Language Academies
- Budget: $406,077.00 (2018)
- Staff: 59 (2008)
- Website: Official Website

The Academia Puertorriqueña de la Lengua Española (Spanish for Puerto Rican Academy of the Spanish Language) is an association of academics and experts on the use of the Spanish language in Puerto Rico. It was founded in San Juan on January 28, 1955. It is a member of the Association of Spanish Language Academies.

The association works with the Royal Spanish Academy to add new words to the Spanish lexicon. In 2017, the academy was instrumental in adding the word "reguetón" to the official Spanish dictionary.

The academy put together a website with Puerto Rican vocabulary which can be searched by themes.
