= Ballajá Barracks =

- Cuartel de Ballajá (Spanish)
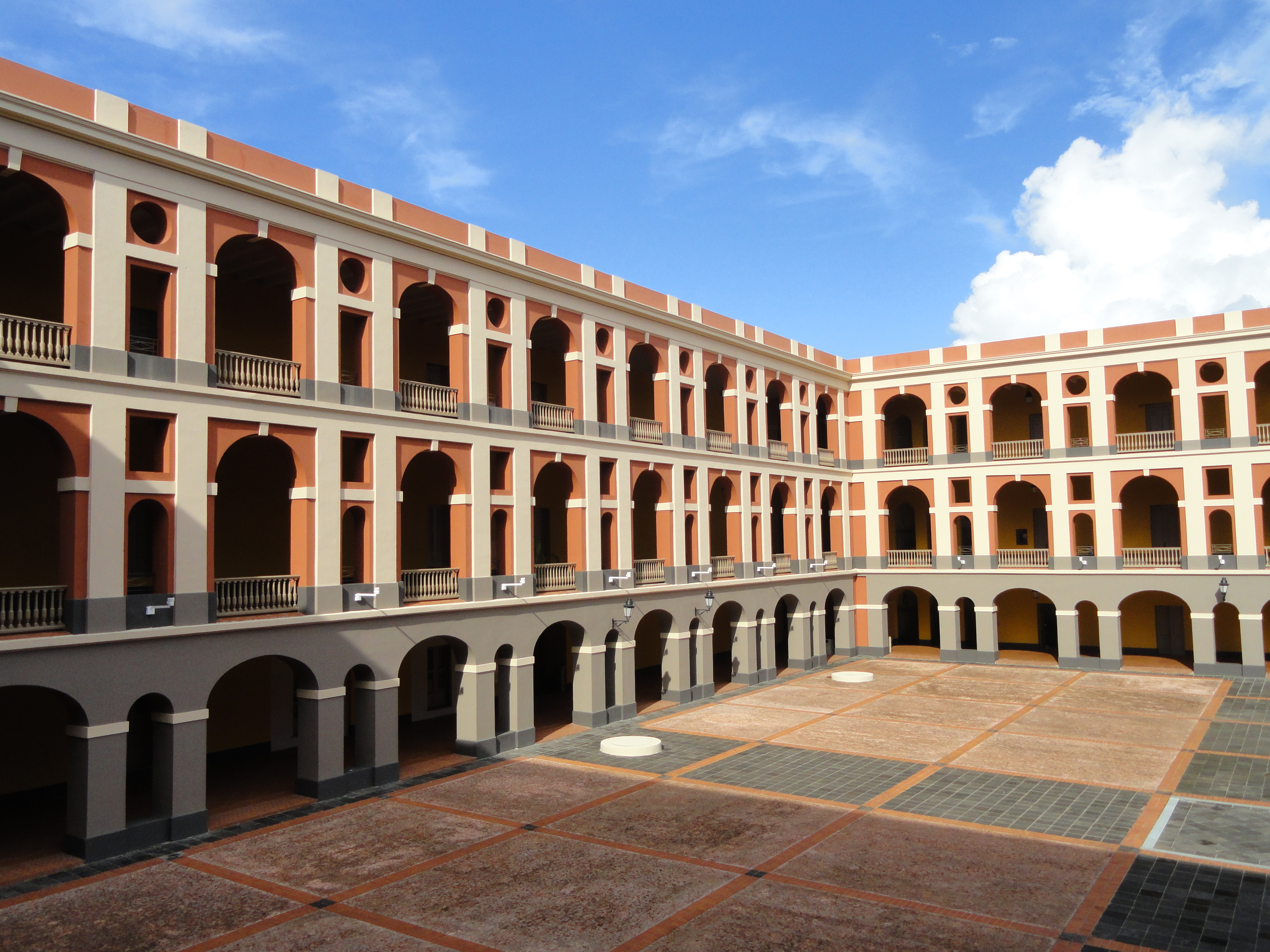
- Interior courtyard of the barracks.

- Location in Puerto Rico.
- 18°27′57″N 66°7′10″W
- Location: Old San Juan, San Juan, Puerto Rico

History
- Built: 1854-1864
- Built for: Spanish Army

Site notes
- Restored: 1990-1993
- Governing body: State Historic Preservation Office
- Owner: Government of Puerto Rico

U.S. National Historic Landmark District – Contributing property
- Designated: October 10, 1972
- Part of: Old San Juan Historic District
- Reference no.: 72001553

The Ballajá Barracks (Cuartel de Ballajá in Spanish) is a historic building and former military barracks located in the Ballajá section of Old San Juan, in the city of San Juan, Puerto Rico. It is located close to El Morro and its esplanade, between the Morovis, Beneficiencia and Norzagaray streets. It was built from 1854 to 1864 to house Spanish and Puerto Rican regiments. The Ballajá Barracks were the last large-scale construction project made by the Spanish Crown in the Americas.

The building has been owned by the government of Puerto Rico since 1976 and today it houses the Museum of the Americas and the Puerto Rican Academy of the Spanish Language, in addition to several businesses and institutions such as a dance school, exhibition spaces, restaurants and the State Office of Historic Conservation.

== History ==
=== Construction and Spanish–American War ===
The Ballajá Barracks were built by the Spanish militia from 1854 to 1864. To build it, six blocks from the Ballajá subbarrio (in Old San Juan) were expropriated from the Dominican Order and demolished in 1853. When the first stone of the building was placed that year, governor Fernando Norzagaray emphasized that the old wooden houses that repulsed him and preceded it were being replaced, by "a solid and majestic building that will add beauty to those parts". The three-story structure was completed in 1864, occupying an area of 7,700 square meters (83,000 sq ft). It could accommodate over 1,000 citizens, originally Spanish soldiers and their families.

Its vast interior patio is one of the best examples of 19th-century Spanish architecture in Puerto Rico. Each floor has paired pilasters, allowing for rectangular passageways. Distinctive rounded arches are featured. Its main staircase is also characteristic. Other than the housing facilities, the barracks had storage rooms, kitchens, mess halls, dungeons, and horse stables. After being completed, the Ballajá barracks became the last large-scale structure built by the Spanish overseas. In 1955, Mario Buschiazzo described it as "one of the most important buildings" of its time for Spain.

The barracks were heavily used during the Spanish–American War near the end of the 19th century. On May 12, 1898, during the American bombing of San Juan, the fleet led by Admiral William T. Sampson damaged the northeast side of the barracks. After the war ended, and with the change of sovereignty, the barracks became the quarters for the United States Army until 1939.

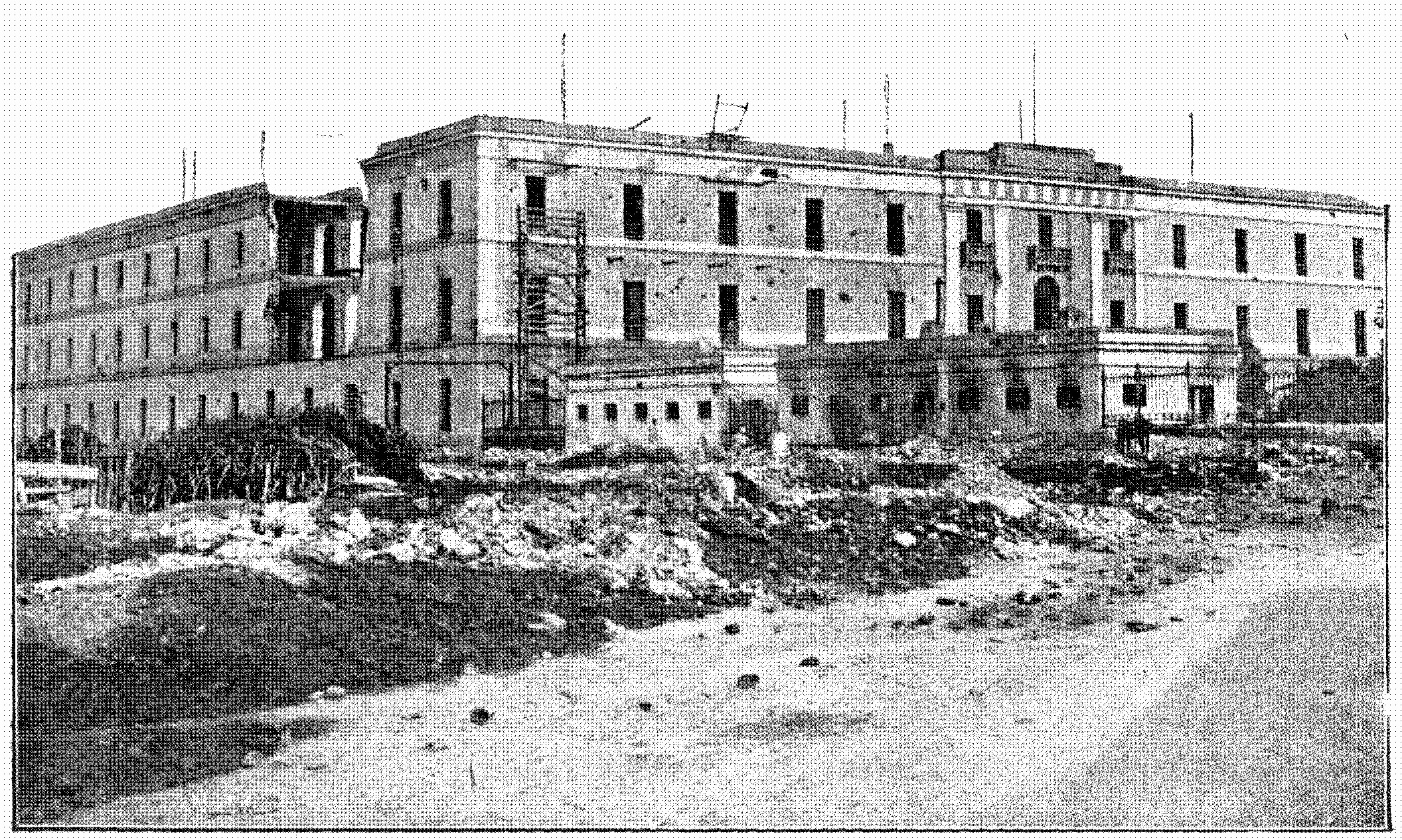
The barracks after American bombardment during the Battle of San Juan, 1898

=== World War II remodelling and restoration ===
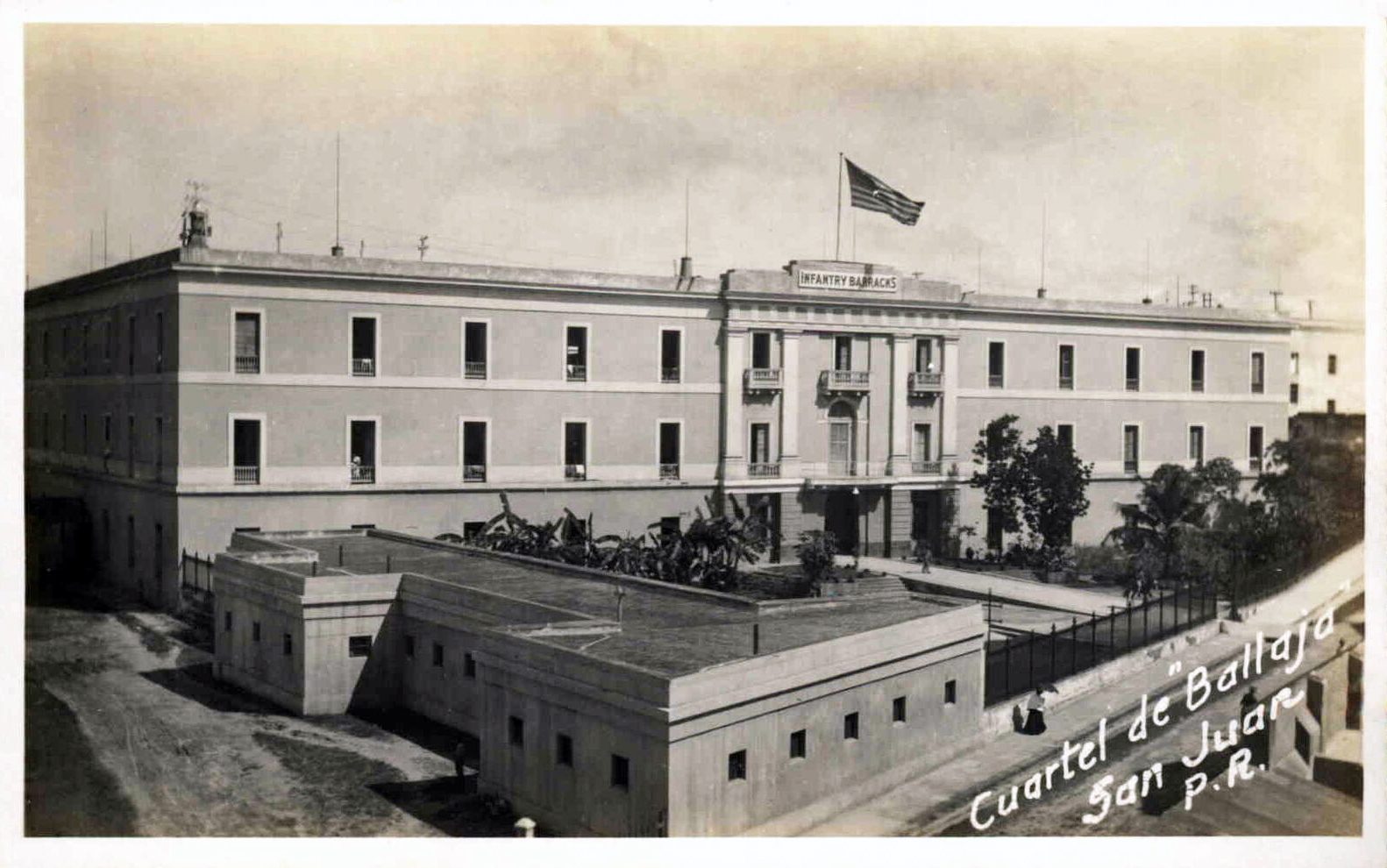
Ballajá in 1920.

During the Second World War, the barracks were used as a military hospital, under the name of Army General Hospital of Fort Brooke. On August 31, 1944, the United States Department of War issued General Order No. 71 which renamed the hospital to Rodriguez (161st) General Hospital, in honor of Major Fernando E. Rodríguez Vargas. To fulfill this purpose, the floors were remade in concrete, while reinforced concrete was also used on the roofs and in places where there were doors, windows or decoration. Wooden stairs were also altered, as did the central patio, while large rooms were divided.

After the end of the war, the building was abandoned and it rapidly decayed. Although it was in disrepair, the building was included in the first heritage list of historic structures and monuments prepared by academic architect Mario J. Buschiazzo for the Puerto Rico Planning Board in 1955. Scholar and archaeologist Ricardo Alegría proposed revitalization of the building for it to be used as an academic or educational institution. In 1967, the Ballajá barracks were transferred to the government of Puerto Rico following the creation of the Consejo para el Manejo y Administración de Ballajá. It was once again repurposed for cultural and educative initiatives, following an agreement between the governor, the National Park Service and the Secretary of the Interior. The building, however, fell into disuse. During the 1980s, the restoration of the Ballajá barracks was discussed in the Plan Especial de Reforma Interior de la Zona Histórica de San Juan. The building was then linked to the upcoming celebration of the Fifth Century anniversary of Columbus' voyages.

Alegría planned for it to host the Museo de las Américas, which would employ the second floor for permanent and temporary exhibits, space for conferences and concerts, a souvenir shop and the rest for Caribbean cultural initiatives. The first floor was intended for a number of purposes; a library, cinema room and shops. It was also meant to host the Len Club and a number of academies. For this, he intended to present it as the masterpiece of the Fifth Century Commission, which included several politicians as well as then director of the Institute of Puerto Rican Culture, Elías López Sobá. The Conservatory of Music of Puerto Rico, Escuela de Artes Plásticas and the University of Puerto Rico (UPR) also tried to acquire the building. Ultimately, Alegría's proposal was accepted.

Restoration began in 1986, with the collaboration of architect Otto Reyes, who also did a historic study. The Puerto Rico Historic Preservation Office was placed in charge. The budget was $200,000 per year, ascending to $25 million. Along the Asilo de Beneficiencia and Hospital de la Concepción were also expected to be restored, forming a cultural center in the area. However, when Hurricane Hugo struck Puerto Rico in 1989, the process stalled. Ultimately further delays occurred, pushing the projected competition into the 1990s, and José García Gómez replaced Reyes. In 1991, the Fundación Arqueológica Antropologíca e Histórica de Puerto Rico protested the change, claiming that the building was going to suffer for it. The National Park Service evaluated the restoration process in response, leading to Alegría protesting that the federal government had almost destroyed it during the bombardment of San Juan that took place during the Spanish-American War and latter heavily modified it to turn it into a hospital.

On October 4, 1992, the Museo de las Américas was formally inaugurated as part of the Fifth Century ceremonies. An attempt to have patrons fund the administration of the building and its surroundings was mostly abandoned after the 1992 Puerto Rican general election. A Council of ten which included Alegría and five agency secretaries was created to secure funds. In 1993, the Pedro Rosselló administration cut funds to the initiative, leaving the museum that was inaugurated the previous year unattended and rumors circled that it could host the Puerto Rico State Commission on Elections (CEE). Nonetheless, Alegre decided to continue. The Oficina de Preservación Histórica began loaning segments of the building for non-cultural activities to fund its rent, as well as water and electricity. When Alegría reached the age of 80 in 2001, the government made a compromise to provide funds for the improvement of Ballajá.

=== Today ===
The Ballajá Barracks today house several educational and cultural organizations, namely the Museo de las Américas on the second floor of the building since 1992. This museum is dedicated to the history, culture and heritage of the American continent. The Museo de Las Américas has three permanent collections: African Heritage, the Indian in America, and Popular Arts in America. In addition to the museum on the second floor, the first floor houses a dance school specializing in tablao flamenco, a bar, a movie theater, a coffee exhibition and café, and a Spanish restaurant called Rincón Ibérico, while the second-floor hosts offices and academic institutions such as the Puerto Rican Academy of the Spanish Language and the State Office of Historic Conservation.

The building sustained damages after Hurricane Maria but restoration was successful with help of more than $17.5 million in FEMA grants. After careful structural analysis and studies from the State Historic Preservation Office, a sedum green roof (or living roof) was installed in the barracks rooftop. This area is open to visitors, and it consists of observation and sitting areas, walkways and solar panels.

== Ownership ==
Initially, when Puerto Rico was ceded by Spain to the United States, the federal government paid the Catholic Church for this property, among others in the area. Ownership of the property, claimed by the Catholic Church, was not a straightforward matter and had to be resolved by the Supreme Court.

The Government of Puerto Rico acquired the building in 1976 through a transfer from the Government of the United States with the commitment of restoring it and using it for cultural, educative, and touristic purposes. In 1986, a reform plan for the San Juan Historic Zone was sketched and the building was restored from 1990 to 1993.

== Gallery ==
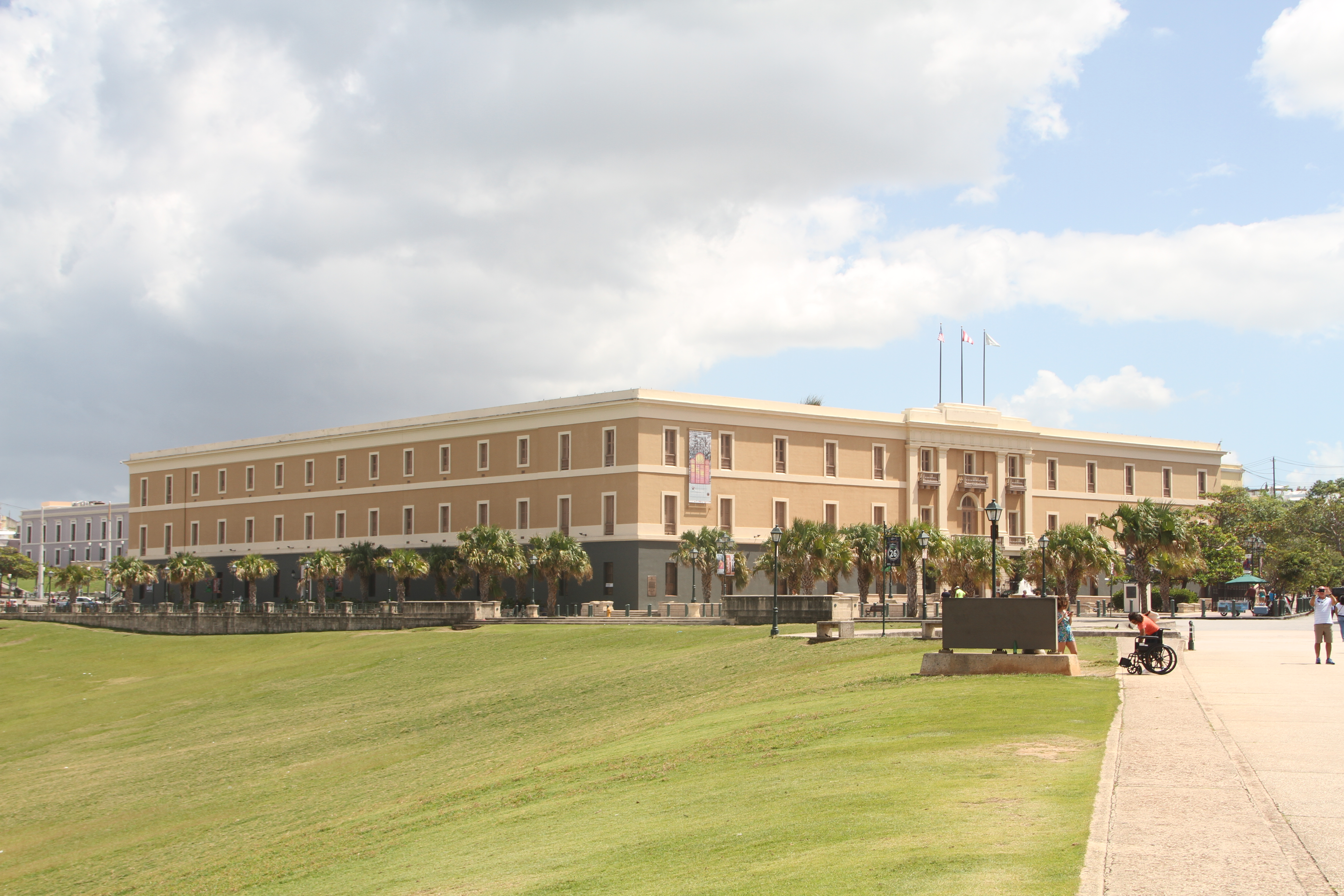
Ballaja Barracks as seen from El Morro esplanade.

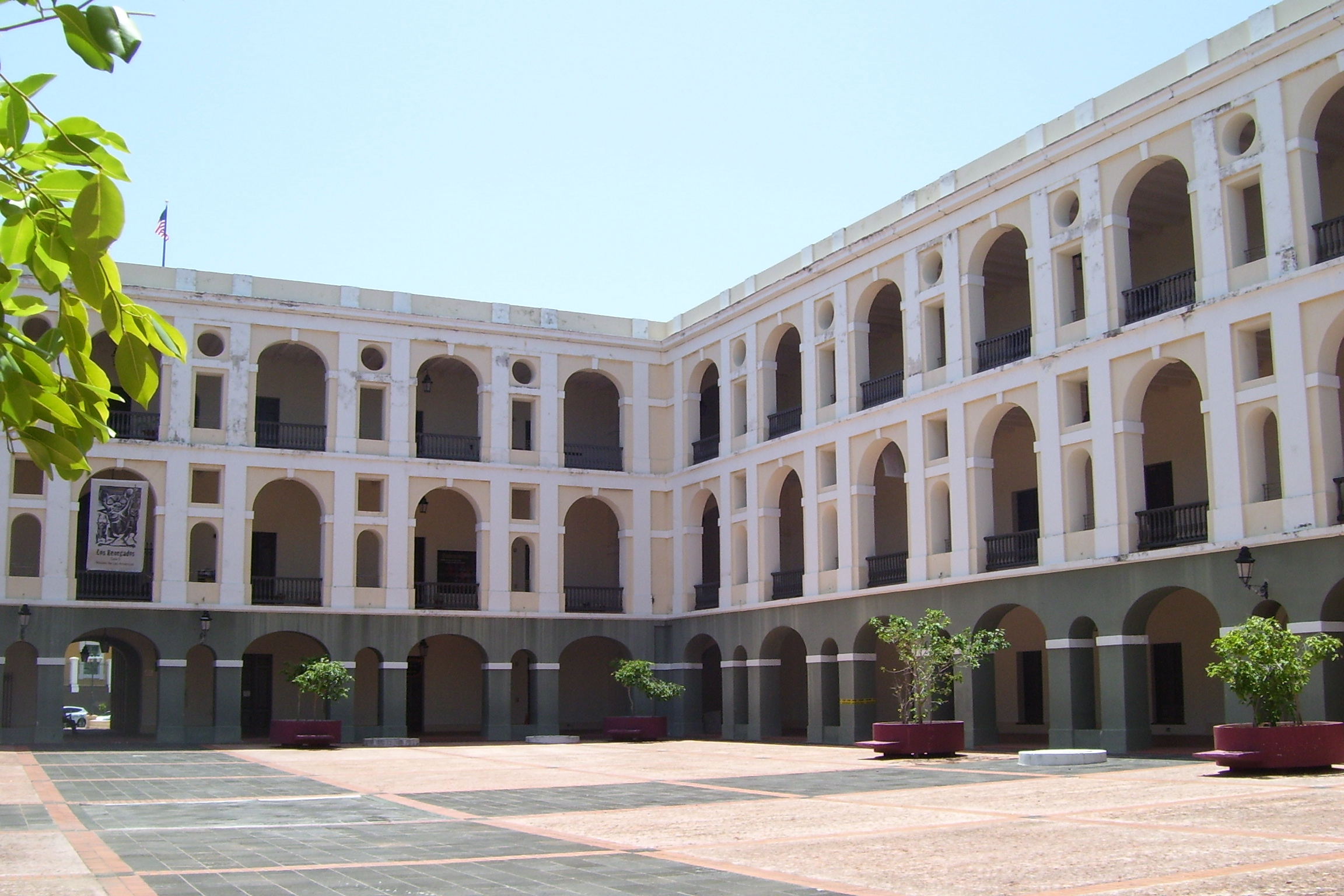
Interior patio of the Ballajá Barracks

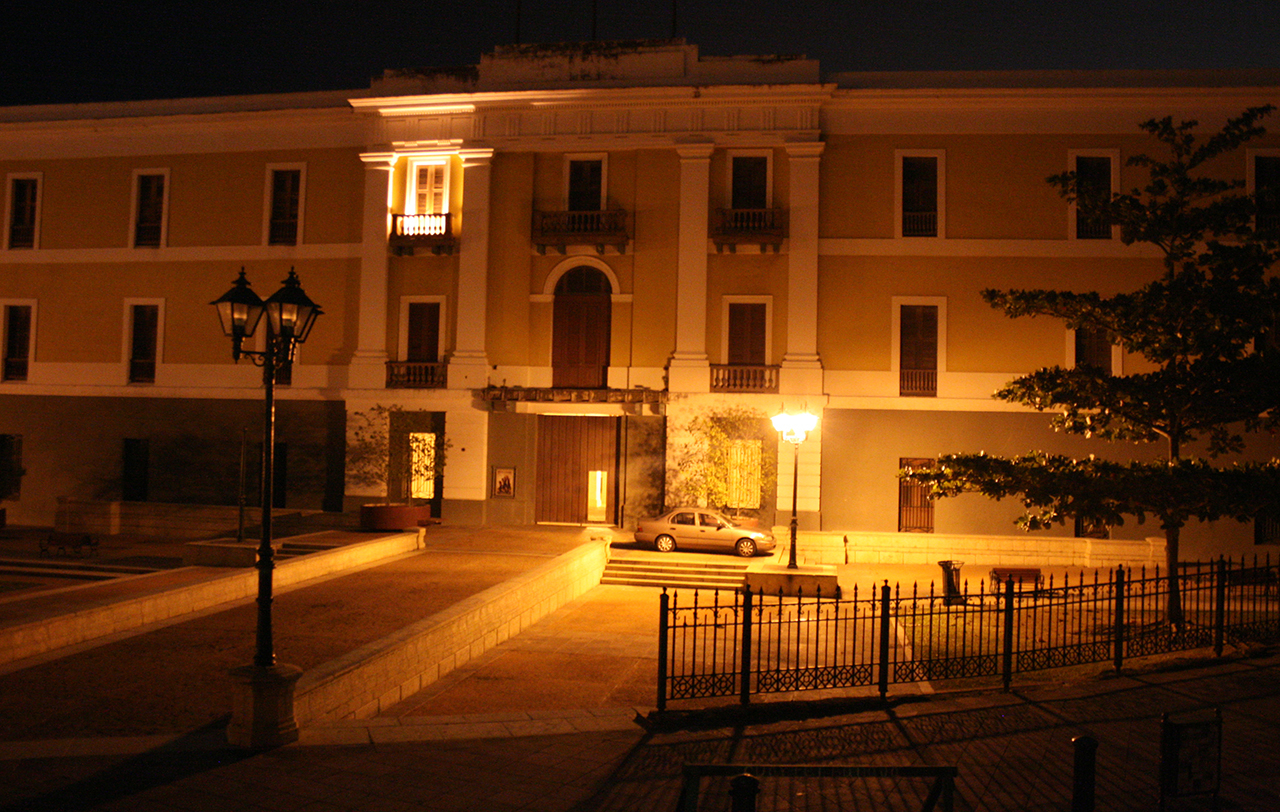
Ballajá Barracks in Old San Juan at night

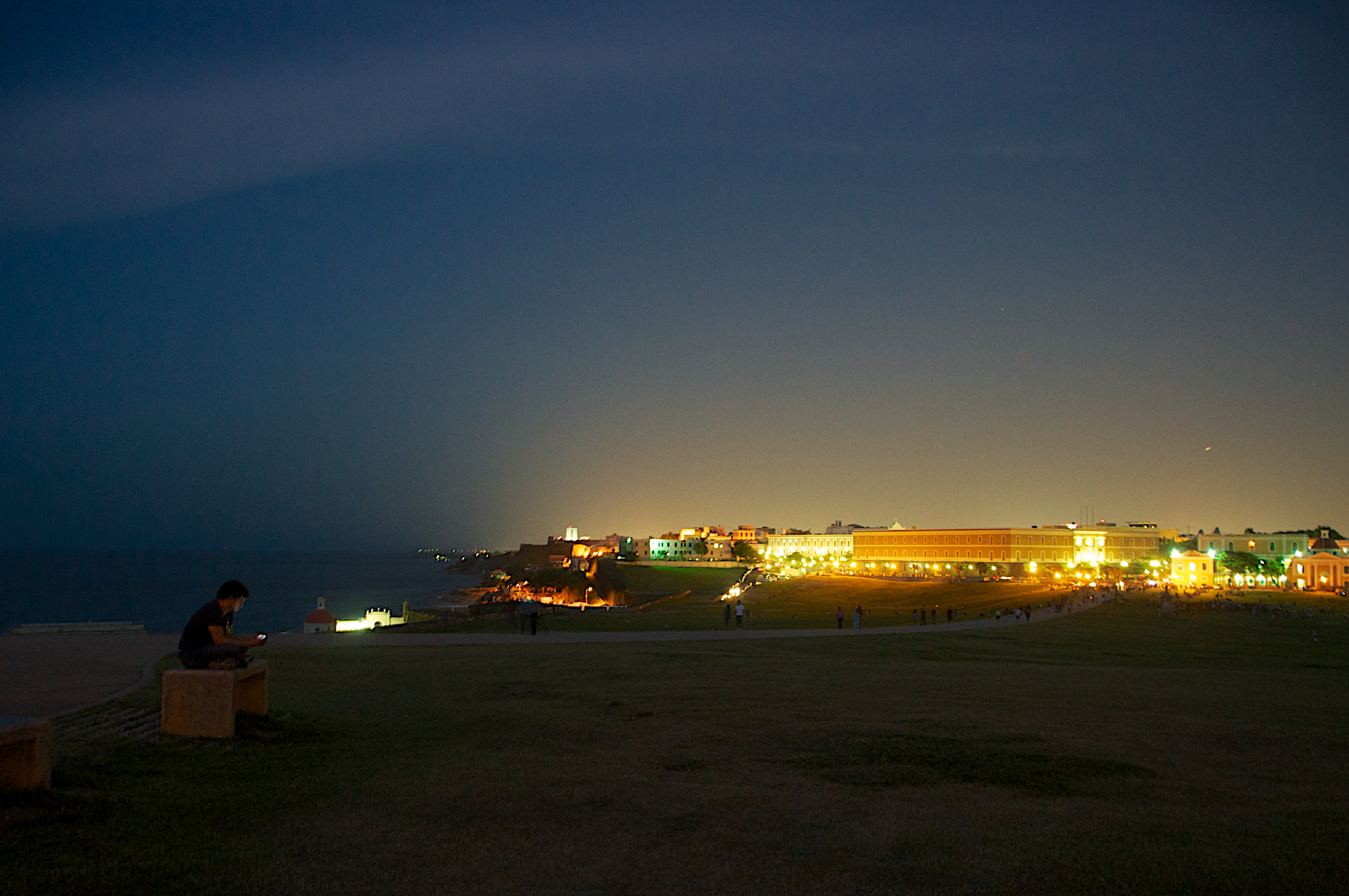
Panoramic view of the Ballajá section of Old San Juan with the barracks in the center.

== See also ==
- Old San Juan
