= Puerto Rico Academy of Arts and Sciences =

Non-profit institution created for the advancement of knowledge

The Puerto Rico Academy of Arts and Sciences is a decades-old non-profit institution created for the advancement of knowledge in the Commonwealth of Puerto Rico. The Academy has published many books and produces a journal titled "Revista de la Academia de Artes y Ciencias de Puerto Rico"
