= Puerto Rican Spanish =

Variety of Spanish language

- Español puertorriqueño
- Pronunciation: [ehpaˈɲol pweltoriˈkeɲo]
- Native speakers: 6 million (Puerto Rico & many stateside Puerto Ricans in U.S. mainland) (2011)
- Language family: Indo-European: Italic; Latino-Faliscan; Romance; Western; Ibero-Romance; West Iberian; Spanish; Latin American Spanish; Caribbean Spanish; Puerto Rican Spanish
- Early forms: Proto-Indo-European: Proto-Italic; Old Latin; Vulgar Latin; Proto-Romance; Old Spanish; Early Modern Spanish
- Writing system: Latin (Spanish alphabet)

Official status
- Regulated by: Academia Puertorriqueña de la Lengua Española

Language codes
- ISO 639-3: –
- Glottolog: puer1238
- IETF: es-PR

Puerto Rican Spanish is the variety of the Spanish language as characteristically spoken in Puerto Rico and by millions of people of Puerto Rican descent living in the United States and elsewhere. It belongs to the group of Caribbean Spanish variants and, as such, is largely derived from Canarian Spanish and Andalusian Spanish. Outside of Puerto Rico, the Puerto Rican accent of Spanish is also commonly heard in the U.S. Virgin Islands and many U.S. mainland cities like Orlando, New York City, Philadelphia, Miami, Tampa, Boston, Cleveland, and Chicago, among others. However, not all stateside Puerto Ricans have knowledge of Spanish. Opposite to island-born Puerto Ricans who primarily speak Spanish, many stateside-born Puerto Ricans primarily speak English, although many stateside Puerto Ricans are fluent in Spanish and English, and often alternate between the two languages.

== Influences ==
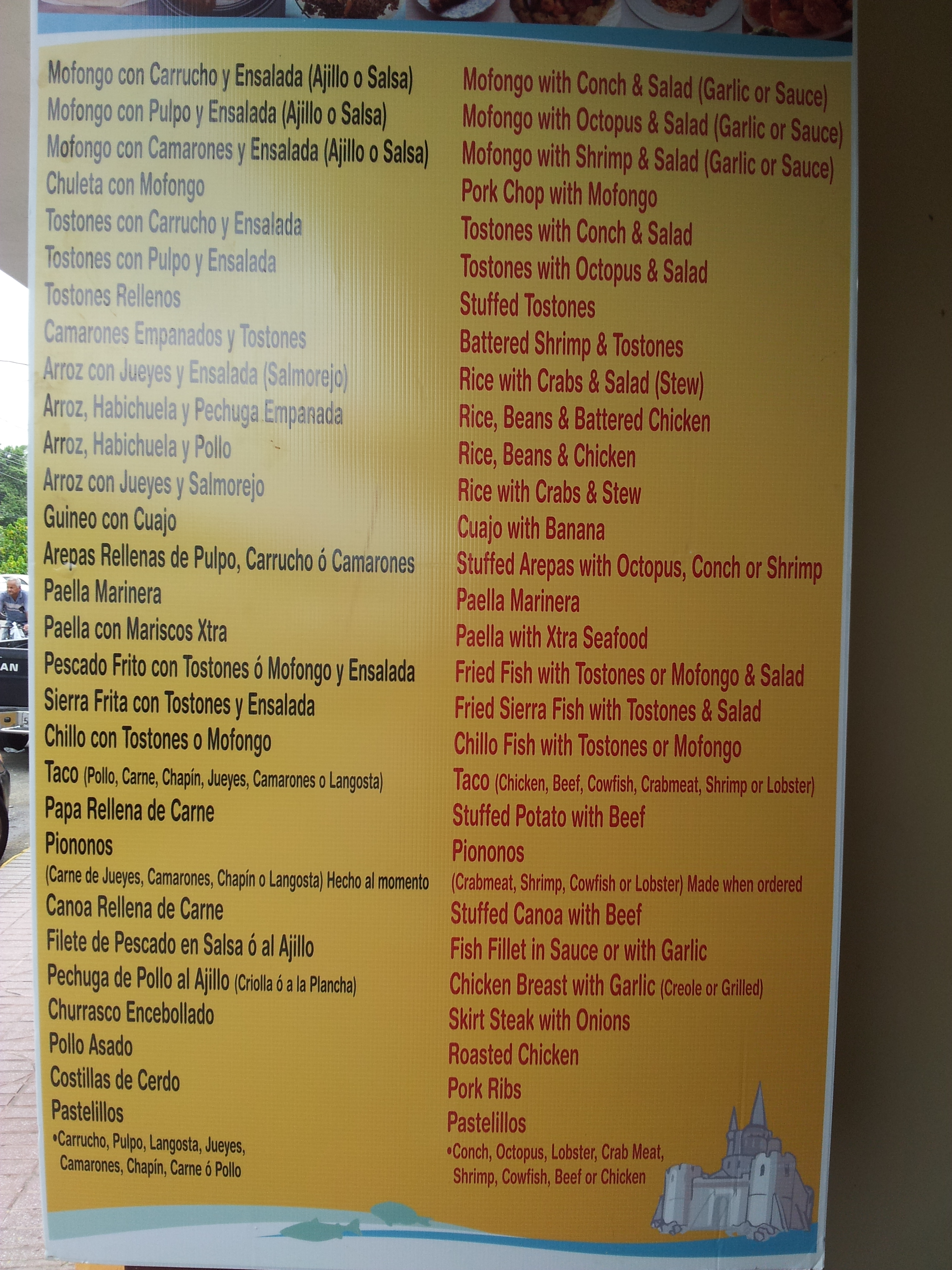
Bilingual menu in Luquillo; it includes such Puerto Rican terms as jueyes ("blue land crab", guineo ("banana"), chapín ("cowfish"), carrucho ("conch"), chillo ("Northern red snapper"), habichuela ("black turtle beans"), arepa, mofongo, canoa

=== Andalusia and the Canary Islands ===
Since most of the original farmers and commoners of Puerto Rico between the 15th and 18th centuries came from Andalusia (Andalucía), the basis for most of Puerto Rican Spanish is Andalusian Spanish (particularly that of Seville) (Sevilla). For example, the endings -ado, -ido, -edo often drop intervocalic /d/ in both Seville and San Juan: hablado > hablao, vendido > vendío, dedo > deo (intervocalic /d/ dropping is quite widespread in coastal American dialects).

Another Andalusian trait is the tendency to weaken postvocalic consonants, particularly /-s/: 'los dos > lo(h) do(h), 'buscar' > buhcá(l) (aspiration or elimination of syllable-final /s/ is quite widespread in coastal American dialects).

Pronouncing "l" instead of "r" in syllable-final position is also a trait of Puerto Rican Spanish that has similarities in Spain—Andalusians sometimes do the opposite, replacing the letter "l" at the end of a syllable with "r" (e.g. saying "Huerva" instead of "Huelva". People from working class areas of Seville can sometimes sound almost indistinguishable from Puerto Ricans (Zatu, the singer of the band SFDK from the Pino Montano district of Seville being an example). This distinction is the main way of distinguishing between the two accents when examples in the "transition zone" exist.

Nevertheless, Canarian Spanish (from Spain's Canary Islands) made the major contribution to Puerto Rican Spanish, and can be considered the basis of the dialect and accent. Many Canarians came in hopes of establishing a better life in the Americas. Most Puerto Rican immigration in the early 19th century included people from the Canary Islands, who, like Puerto Ricans, had inherited most of their linguistic traits from Andalusia.

Canarian influence is most present in the language of those Puerto Ricans who live in the central mountain region, who blended it with the remnant vocabulary of the Taíno. Canarian and Caribbean dialects share a similar intonation which, in general terms, means that stressed vowels are usually quite long. Puerto Rican and Canarian Spanish accents are strikingly similar. When visiting Tenerife or Las Palmas, Puerto Ricans are usually taken at first hearing for fellow-Canarians from a distant part of the Canary archipelago.

Later in the 19th century other Spanish immigrants from Catalonia, the Balearic Islands, Asturias and Galicia plus other European settlers—mostly from France (including Corsica), Italy, Ireland, Scotland, Germany, and even some overseas Chinese—settled in Puerto Rico. Words from these regions and countries joined the linguistic stew. The suffix -ito, common in various Spanish dialects as a diminutive, is also found locally.

Puerto Rican Word	Normal Spanish Word	English Translation	Origin
Pana	Amigo	Friend	American English partner
Chacho	Muchacho	Guy	Canary Island
Acho			Murcia, Andalucía
Babilla/Cojones	Coraje	Courage	Andalucía
Boricua	Puertorriqueño	Puerto Rican	Taíno Borinquén

=== Taíno influence ===
When the Spanish settlers colonized Puerto Rico in the early 16th century, thousands of Taíno people lived on the island, but almost immediately fell victim to diseases brought from Europe (chicken pox, measles, smallpox, influenza and the common cold) to which they had no natural immunity. This caused the rapid decline and almost complete destruction of the indigenous Taínos within the first fifty years of exposure to the European colonists.

A great number of Taíno language words like hamaca ('hammock'), huracán ('hurricane'), and tabaco ('tobacco') came into general Spanish usage, similar to the employment of indigenous words on the North American mainland by the English-speaking colonists, i.e., maize (corn), moccasin (moccasin), moose (moose). Taíno names and/or Hispanicized Taíno names for geographic locations such as Arecibo, Bayamón, Caguas, Canóvanas, Guaynabo, Gurabo, Jayuya, Luquillo, Mayagüez, Moca, Naguabo and Vieques are to be found throughout Puerto Rico.

=== African influence ===
The first African slaves were brought to the island in the 16th century. Although several African tribes have been recorded in Puerto Rico, it is the Kongo from Central Africa that is considered to have had the most influence on Puerto Rican Spanish. In the early colonial period many African slaves in Puerto Rico spoke Bozal Spanish. Words like gandul (pigeon pea), fufú (mashed plantains), and malanga (a root vegetable), are commonly used and are of African origin. There also is the Afro-Caribbean/West Indian influence; for example, many words and expressions come from patois and creolized languages from the neighboring islands.

=== United States influence and Puerto Rican anglicisms ===
In 1898, during the armed conflicts of the Puerto Rican Campaign, Spain ceded Puerto Rico to the United States as part of a peace treaty that brought the Spanish–American War to a sudden conclusion. The United States Army and the early colonial administration tried to impose the English language on island residents. Between 1902 and 1948, the main language of instruction in public schools (used for all subjects except Spanish language courses) was English.

Consequently, many American English words are now found in the Puerto Rican vocabulary. American English has had a fluctuating status as a second official language of the island, depending on the political party in power at the moment. The majority of Puerto Ricans today do not speak English at home, and Spanish remains the mother tongue of Puerto Ricans.

Stateside Puerto Ricans are known to borrow English words or phrases in mid-sentence in a phenomenon called code-switching, sometimes characterized as Spanglish. Puerto Rican writer Giannina Braschi published the first Spanglish novel, Yo-Yo Boing!, in 1998, a book that represents the code-switching linguistic style of some Latino immigrants in the United States. However, this mixture of Spanish and English is simply an informal blending of languages, not a separate language or dialect, and is not a fundamental characteristic of Spanish or Puerto Rican culture. It is merely an occasional convenience used by speakers who are very fluent in the two languages.

Puerto Rico has representation in the Royal Spanish Academy and has its own national academy along with the Spanish-speaking countries of Hispanic America.

== Accent ==
Puerto Rican accents, both in Spanish and English, could be described as a reflection of Puerto Rico's historical ethnic cultures.

Puerto Rican Spanish, like the language of every other Spanish-speaking area, has its distinctive phonological features ("accent"), which derive from the Indigenous, African, and European languages that came into contact during the history of the region. The accents of River Plate Spanish (Argentina and Uruguay), for example, were heavily influenced by the presence of Italians in those countries.

In the case of Puerto Rico, Spaniards arrived from many regions within Spain and brought with them their own regional dialects/accents. A large number of Spaniards came in particular from a region of southern Spain, Andalusia, and many others arrived from Spain's islands off the coast of North Africa, known as the Canary Islands. When visiting Tenerife or Las Palmas (Islas Canarias, Spain), Puerto Ricans are usually taken at first hearing for fellow Canarians from a distant part of the Canary archipelago. It is the accents of those regions that were as the basis of the accent of Spanish that is spoken in Puerto Rico.

The indigenous population of Taínos left many words in the names of geographical areas of the Island (Jayuya, Mayagüez, etc.), and others are used to name everyday items such as hamaca ('hammock') or to describe natural phenomena such as huracán ('hurricane').

Africans in Puerto Rico were brought in as slave labor, mostly to work on coastal or lowland sugar plantations. They contributed a large number of words to colloquialisms and island cuisine, introduced words, and influenced the speech rhythms. That can be noticed by visiting the parts of the island where they have historically been present (almost exclusively along the coasts). Also, the Afro-Caribbean/West Indian patois/Creole linguistic presence is very strong and has influenced Puerto Rican culture, as is reflected in music (such as reggae) and culinary dishes.

Chinese Puerto Ricans and other Asians who have established themselves in Puerto Rico also adopt the accent, but with a tinge of an East Asian.

The Puerto Rican accent is somewhat similar to the accents of the Spanish-speaking Caribbean basin, including Cuba and the Dominican Republic, and those from the Caribbean/coastal regions of Venezuela, Colombia, Panama, Honduras, and Nicaragua (particularly to a non-Puerto Rican). However, any similarity will depend on the level of education of the Puerto Rican speaker and their immediate geographic location. It also continues to be extremely similar to the accent of the Canary Islanders and Andalusians in southern Spain. Overall, most Puerto Ricans make an emphatic distinction between their accent and other Caribbean Spanish accents.

=== Features ===
Seseo
Like in all Latin American and Caribbean Spanish dialects, seseo is a prominent feature of Puerto Rican Spanish, wherein ⟨c⟩ (after front vowels ⟨i, e⟩) and ⟨z⟩ are pronounced [s] rather than [θ] in most parts of Spain. These include: /saˈpato/ instead of /θaˈpato/ (zapato) 'shoe'), and /aˈsul/ instead of /aˈθul/ (azul 'blue').
Debuccalization or elision of /s/
In syllable-final position (i.e., before a consonant or at the end of a word), /s/ is debuccalized to [h] or eliminated altogether. Examples include [lah ˈrosah] instead of [laz ˈrosas] (las rosas 'the roses'), [loh ðoh] instead of [loz ðos] (los dos 'the two'). This is also common in other "lowland Spanish" dialects (Chilean, River Plate, etc.) and in the southern half of Spain. The most common phrases this affects are "¿Como estás tú?" and "Como está usted?"; respectively, these sound like [ˈkomwe(h)ta(h)ˈtu] and [ˈkomwe(h)taw(h)ˈte].
Glottalization of /x/
/x/ is usually realized as [h]: [lah muˈheɾeh] instead of [laz muˈxeɾes] (las mujeres 'the women'), and [hoˈse] instead of [xoˈse] (José).
Elision of intervocalic /d/
/d/ underɡoes lenition to the point of complete deletion (/d/ > [ð] > [∅]): [ehˈta.o] instead of [esˈtaðo] (estado 'state'), and [ˈto.o] instead of [ˈtoðo] (todo 'all').
Elision of final /d/ at the end of a word
In that case, stress is usually placed on the final vowel. Examples include [paˈɾe] instead of [paˈɾeð] (pared 'wall') and [maˈðɾi] instead of [maˈðɾið] (Madrid).
Fricativization of /r/ to [χ]
Among rural Puerto Ricans, words like arroz 'rice' and carro 'car' can be pronounced [aˈχos] and [ˈkaχo], respectively; however, [χ] is a free variant of /r/, making [aˈχos] and [ˈkaχo] interchangeable to [aˈros] and [ˈkaro].
Lateralization of /r/ to [l]
Syllable-final /r/ that is not followed by a vowel often becomes [l], so that words like perdón ('forgiveness') and Puerto Rico become peldón and Puelto Rico, respectively.
Realization of syllable- and word-final /r/
Aside from [r], [ɾ], [χ], and [l], syllable-final /r/ can be realized as [ɹ], an influence of American English on Puerto Rican Spanish. Examples include verso 'verse' becoming [ˈbeɹso] aside from [ˈbeɾso], [ˈberso] or [ˈbelso]; invierno 'winter' becoming [imˈbjeɹno] aside from [imˈbjeɾno], [imˈbjerno] or [imˈbjelno]; and parlamento 'parliament' becomes [paɹlaˈmento] aside from [paɾlaˈmento], [parlaˈmento] or [palaˈmento]. In word-final position, /r/ will usually be:
- either a trill, tap, approximant, [l], or elided when followed by a consonant or a pause, as in amo[r~ɾ~ɹ~l~∅‿] paterno ('paternal love').
- a tap, approximant, or [l] when followed by a vowel-initial word, as in amo[ɾ~ɹ~l‿] eterno ('eternal love').
Retraction of /n/ to [ŋ]
Word-final /n/ is retracted (i.e., velarized) as [ŋ], as in consideran [kõnsiˈðeɾãŋ] ('they consider') and Teherán [te.eˈɾãŋ] ('Tehran').
Syllable reduction
Puerto Ricans also often shorten words by eliminating whole syllables. Examples are the words para 'for', madre 'mother', and padre 'father': Puerto Ricans may pronounce para as [pa], madre as [mai̯], and padre as [pai̯]. In familiar or intimate speech, para tí 'for you/thee' is commonly written as pa' tí. In addition, the words comadre and compadre may be pronounced and spelled as comay and compay, respectively.

=== Effects of Spanish–English contact and bilingualism ===
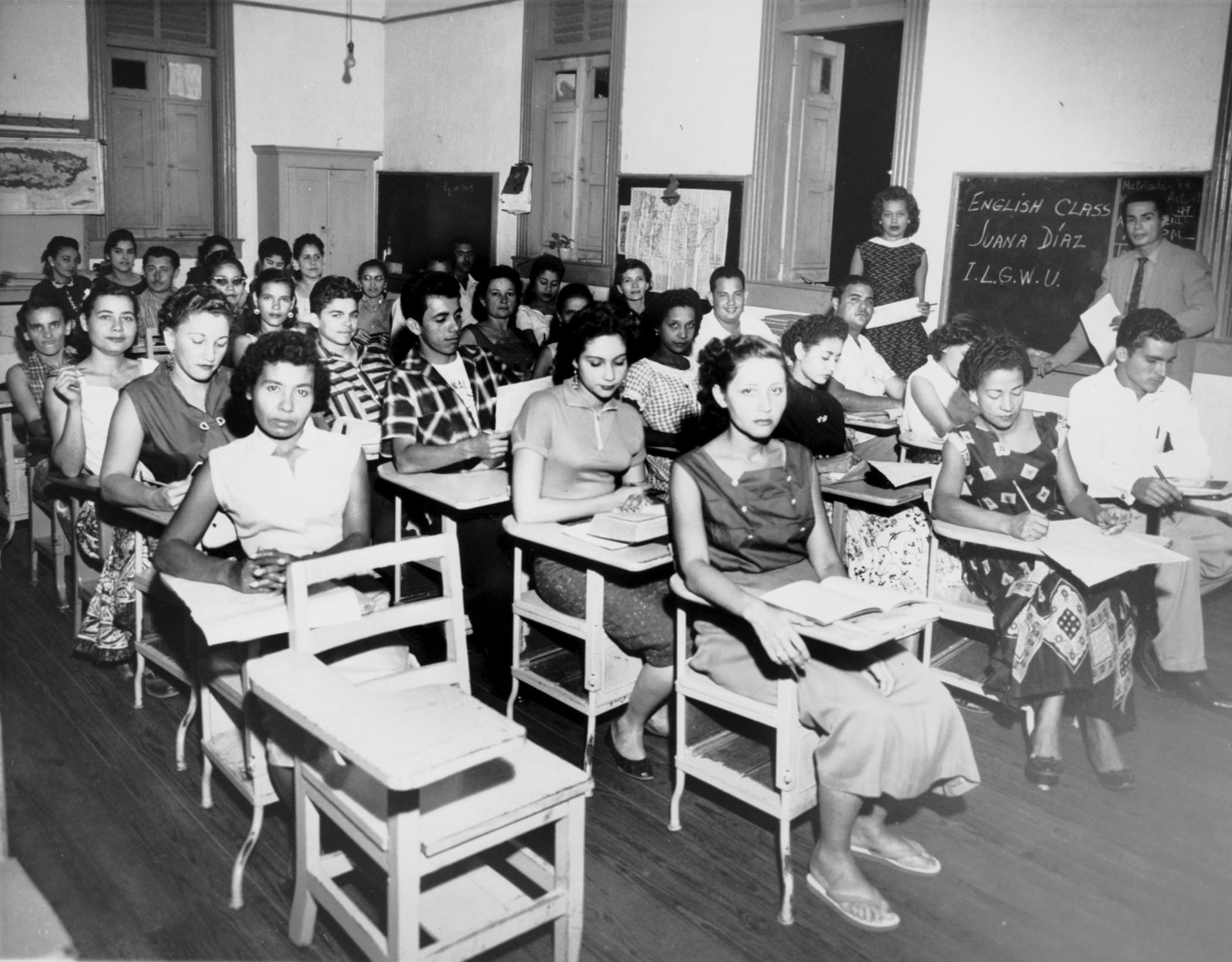
English class for Spanish speakers in Juana Diaz, Puerto Rico, March 1, 1968.

During the Spanish–American War and the early colonial period, English was imposed on island residents. English is currently an official governmental language on the island, but rates of bilingualism in Puerto Rico (with varying degrees of proficiency in English) are modest.

Given the sustained contact between Spanish and English in Puerto Rico and on the mainland, bilingual Puerto Ricans may exhibit contact phenomena (code-switching, borrowing, etc.) in both their Spanish and English.

Puerto Ricans descended from the large number of migrants who left the island throughout the 20th century can be found in numerous communities along the Eastern coast of the United States. In addition to major metropolitan areas such as New York, many Puerto Ricans also went to areas such as Connecticut, Chicago, Delaware, New Jersey, Florida, Massachusetts, Pennsylvania, Rhode Island, California, and Hawaii. Because of their high-rates of military enlistment, Puerto Rican communities are also found in other areas across the U.S. near military installations.

The accent of Spanish-speaking Puerto Ricans living in mainland U.S. may be influenced by their predominantly English-speaking surroundings. Speakers maintain features of Puerto Rican Spanish, and their accents can also show influences of the area of the United States where they grew up. As "native bilinguals", their Spanish may include phonological features of the variety of American English that they speak (see discussion of /r/ above).

== See also ==
- Spanish dialects and varieties
- List of Puerto Rican slang words and phrases
