= Adjuntas barrio-pueblo =

Historical and administrative center (seat) of Adjuntas, Puerto Rico

Adjuntas barrio-pueblo Pueblo de Adjuntas
- Municipality Seat
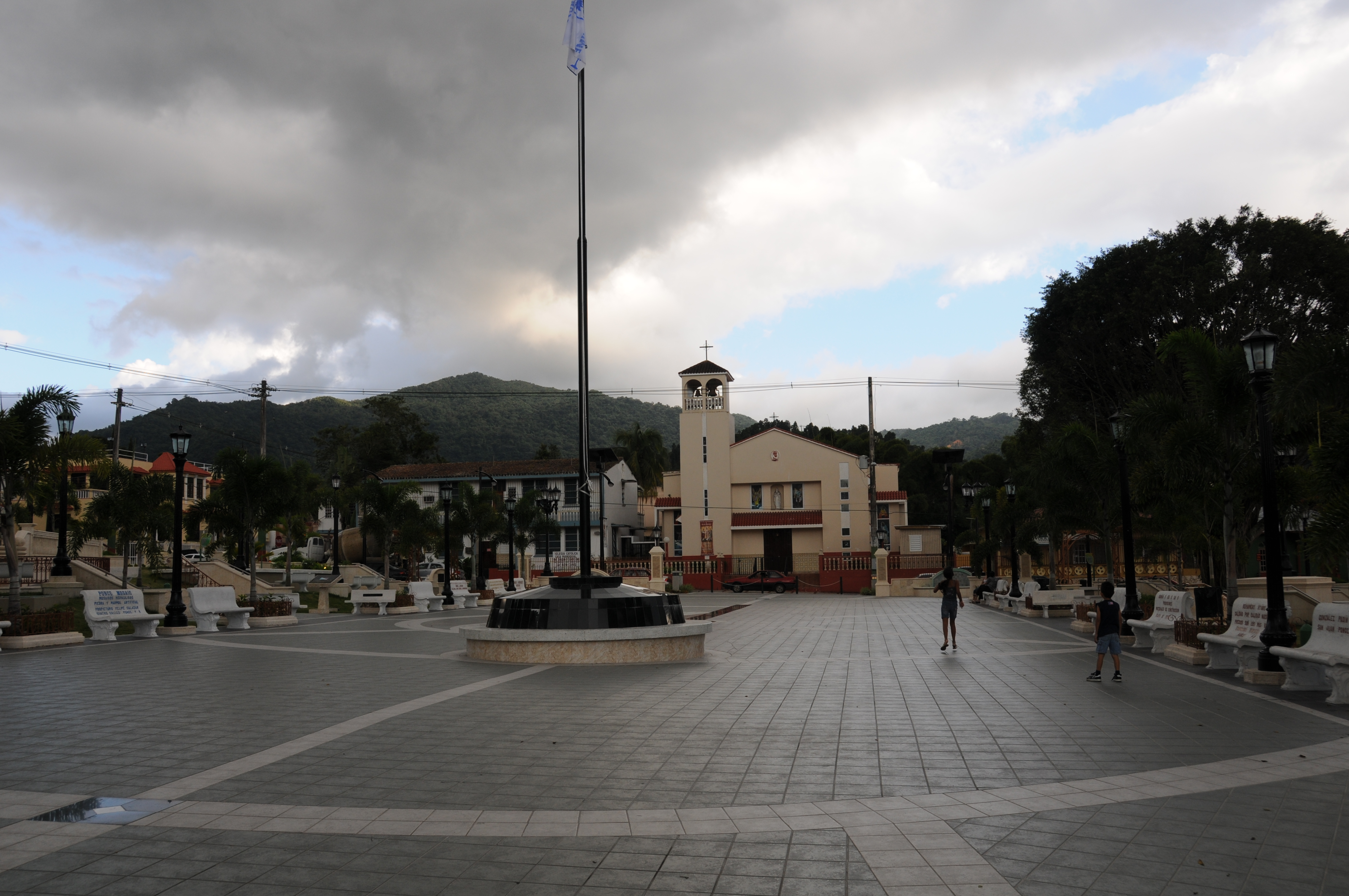
- The central plaza with its church in 2008

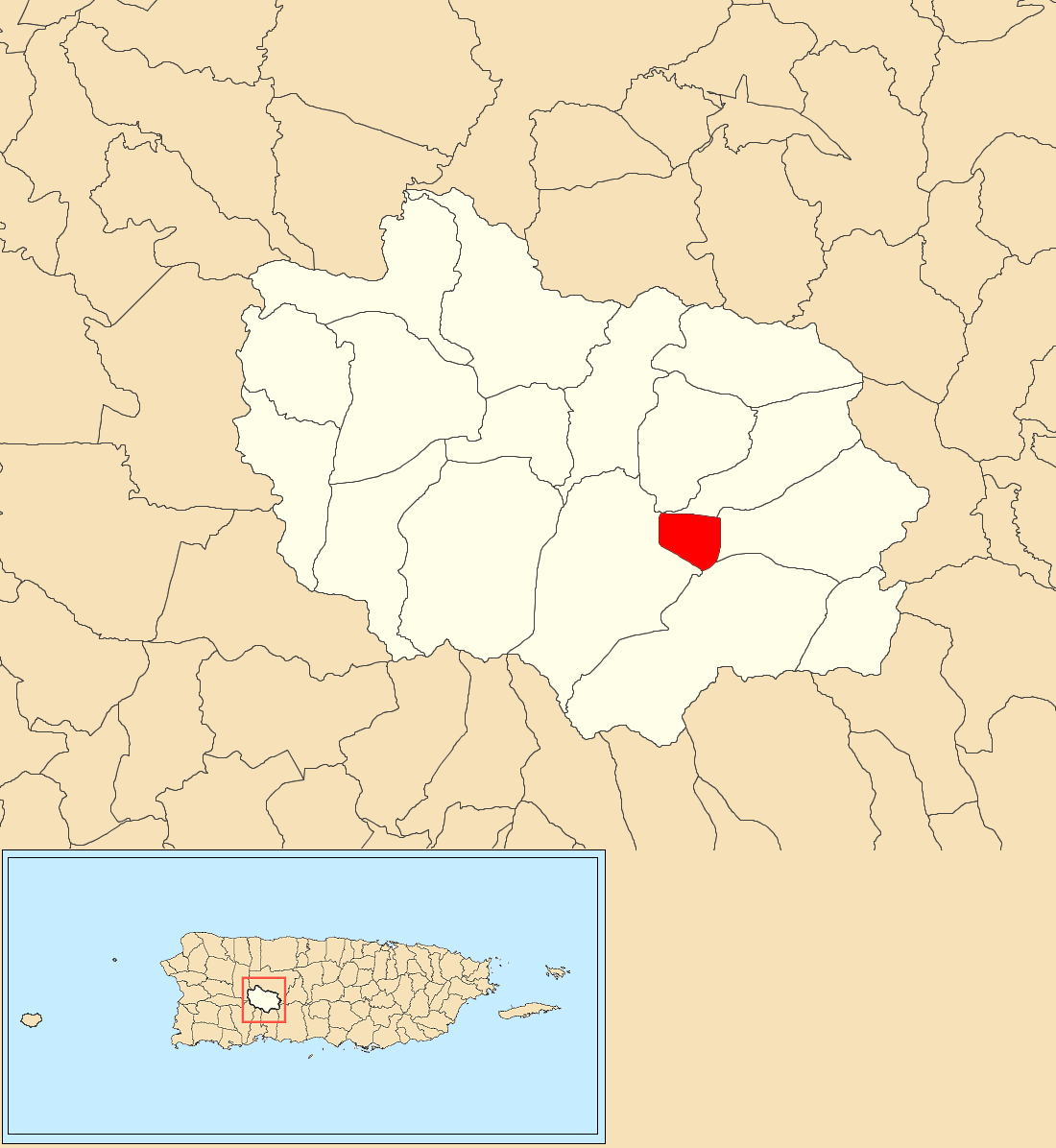
- Location of Adjuntas barrio-pueblo within the municipality of Adjuntas shown in red

- Location of Puerto Rico
- Coordinates: 18°09′50″N 66°43′25″W
- Commonwealth: Puerto Rico
- Municipality: Adjuntas

Area
  - Total: 0.75 sq mi (1.9 km^{2})
  - Land: 0.75 sq mi (1.9 km^{2})
  - Water: 0.00 sq mi (0 km^{2})
- Elevation: 1,614 ft (492 m)

Population (2020)
  - Total: 4,169
  - Density: 5,874.7/sq mi (2,268.2/km^{2})
- Source: 2020 Census
- Time zone: UTC−4 (AST)
- ZIP Codes: 00601, 00631
- Area code: 787/939
- Website: adjuntaspr.com

Adjuntas barrio-pueblo, also colloquially known as Adjuntas Pueblo or Pueblo de Adjuntas, is an urban barrio and the municipal seat of Adjuntas, a municipality of Puerto Rico. Its population in 2020 was 4,169.

As was customary under Spanish Law in Puerto Rico, the municipality has an urban barrio called pueblo which contains a central plaza, the municipal buildings (including the city hall), and a central Catholic church (a parish or cathedral). Fiestas patronales (patron saint festival) are held in the central plaza every year.

== History ==
Historical population
Census	Pop.	Note	%±
1900	1,963		—
1910	1,406		−28.4%
1920	1,729		23.0%
1930	2,376		37.4%
1940	3,856		62.3%
1950	5,262		36.5%
1960	5,318		1.1%
1970	5,319		0.0%
1980	5,239		−1.5%
1990	5,081		−3.0%
2000	4,980		−2.0%
2010	4,406		−11.5%
2020	4,169		−5.4%
U.S. Decennial Census; 1899 (shown as 1900) 1910-1930; 1930-1950 1960 1980-2000 20102020

The location of modern-day Adjuntas Pueblo was first settled in the Cidra River valley at the beginning of the 19th century, along an old road (today route PR-123) that connected Utuado with Ponce and the southern coast of Puerto Rico. At the time, the territory formed part of the municipal region of Coamo. A chapel was erected in 1805, which was later upgraded into a parish church by petition of the citizens of Adjuntas. The official founding of the pueblo happened on August 11, 1815, with Don Diego Maldonado being its official founder and first elected representative. The settlement of Adjuntas was granted official villa status by the Spanish crown in 1894.

Adjuntas barrio-pueblo was in Spain's gazetteers until Puerto Rico was ceded by Spain in the aftermath of the Spanish–American War under the terms of the Treaty of Paris of 1898 and became an unincorporated territory of the United States. In 1899, the United States Department of War conducted a census of Puerto Rico finding that the population of Adjuntas barrio-pueblo (Pueblo) was 1,963.

== Geography ==
Adjuntas Pueblo is located in a high valley of the Cordillera Central formed by the Cidra River, a tributary of the northward flowing Arecibo River. Its elevation averages between 1,640 feet (500 m) and 1,870 feet (570 m) above sea level, making Adjuntas the third highest downtown (pueblo) in Puerto Rico after Aibonito and Barranquitas. Adjuntas Pueblo also has the distinction of having marked the lowest recorded temperature for a downtown (pueblo) in the island, at 44°F (6.7°C) in 1980 and 2012. Lower temperatures however have been recorded in the mountainous areas of the municipality.

== Culture ==
The central plaza or square is a place for official and unofficial recreational events and a place where people can gather and socialize. The Laws of the Indies, which regulated life in Puerto Rico in the early 19th century, stated the plaza's purpose was for "the parties" (celebrations, festivities) (Spanish: a propósito para las fiestas), and that the square should be proportionally large enough for the number of citizens (Spanish: grandeza proporcionada al número de vecinos). These Spanish regulations also stated that the streets nearby should be comfortable portals for passersby, protecting them from the elements: sun and rain.

=== Fiestas Patronales ===
The traditional patron feast celebrations in Adjuntas are celebrated after Saints Joachim and Anne and take place during the week of August 21 (today, July 26). As patron saints of the town of Adjuntas, Joachim and Anne (the parents of Mary, mother of Jesus), not only give the name to the current local parish church but also the original chapel established at the first settlement of Adjuntas in 1805.

=== Other festivals and events ===
Adjuntas Pueblo hosts other notable celebrations throughout the year such as the citrus festival (Festival de la Cidra) every month of August. Due to its elevation and climate, Adjuntas is the largest producer of citrus (called cidra in Puerto Rican Spanish) in the island.

== Landmarks and places of interest ==
- The Adjuntas Public Square (Plaza Pública de Adjuntas), officially named Plaza Poeta Arístides Moll Boscana, located at the very center of town, is one of the highest in Puerto Rico, at almost 1,640 feet (500 m) in elevation. It hosts a large working thermometer, paying homage to some of the coldest recorded temperatures in Puerto Rico. As it is custom in Puerto Rico, the plaza also hosts the city hall (alcaldía), designed by Rafael Carmoega and listed in the National Register of Historic Places since 2025, and the town Roman Catholic parish church (Parroquia San Joaquín), inaugurated in 1815 but rebuilt in 1968.
- Casa Pueblo (Spanish for "the people's house") is a non-profit community and educational organization dedicated to the protection of the environment. It is located in a historic Criollo house, and it often hosts cultural events, educational tours and classes. This organization is largely responsible for the creation of the nearby People's Forest (Bosque del Pueblo).
- The Washington Irving Grade School (Escuela Graduada Washington Irving) is a National Register of Historic Places-listed building located near the town plaza.

== Gallery ==
Places in Adjuntas barrio-pueblo:

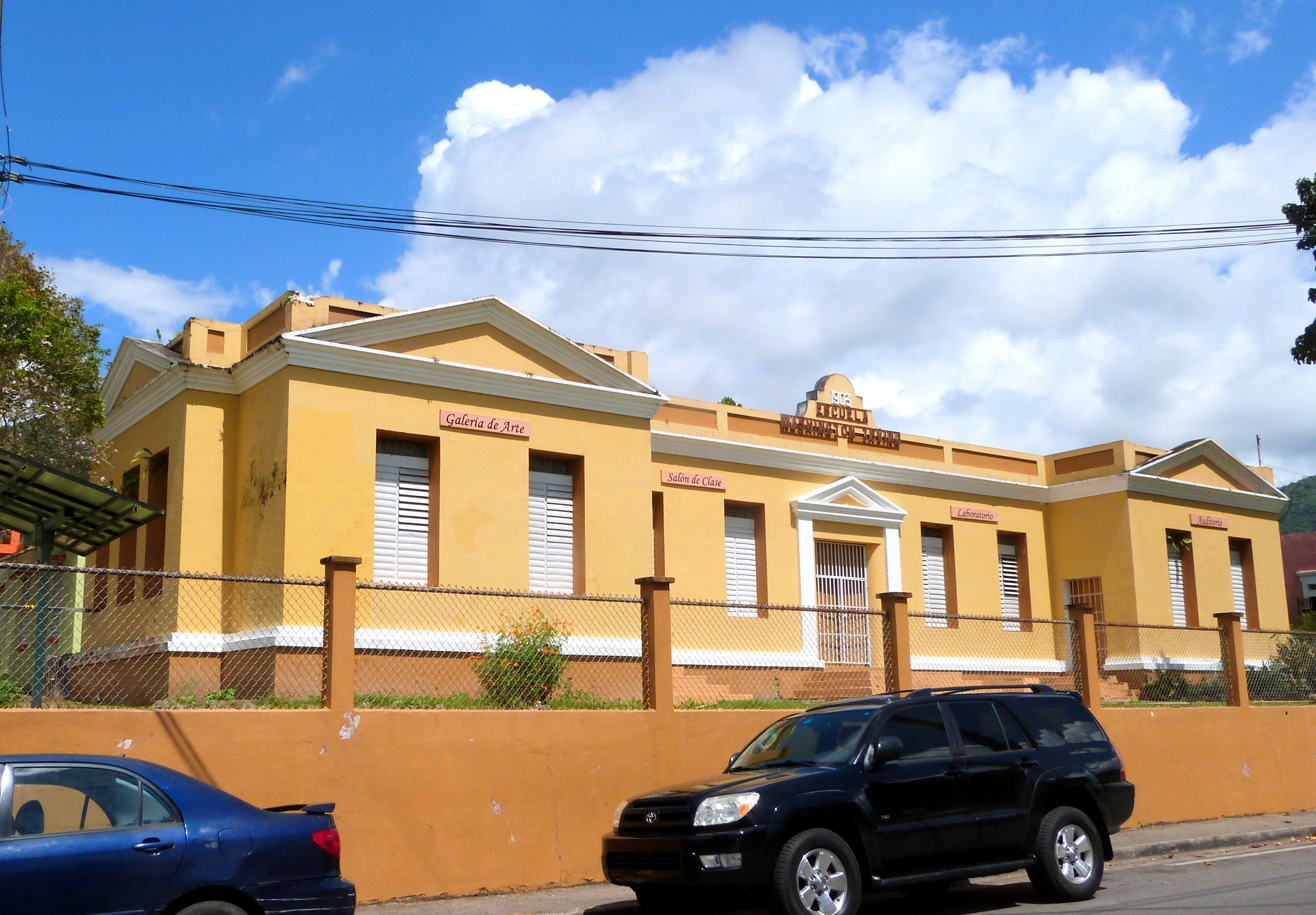
Washington Irving School, listed on the US National Register of Historic Places

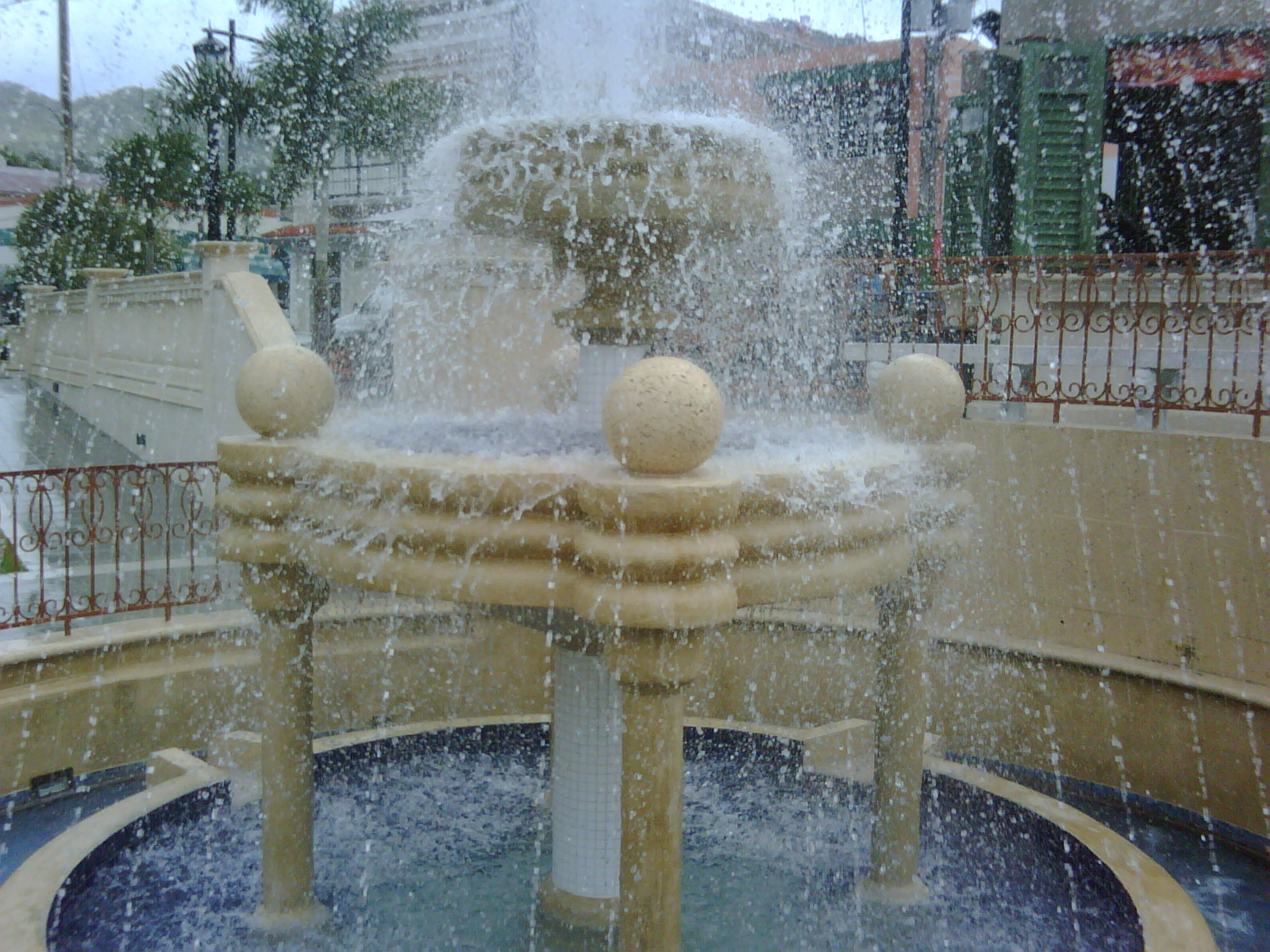
Fountain at the central plaza of Adjuntas

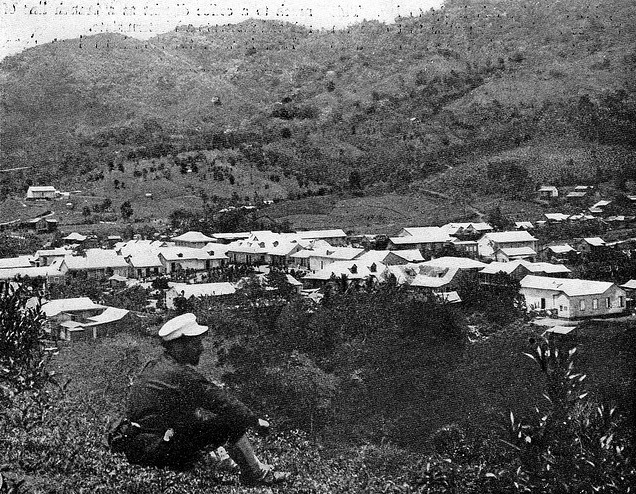
Adjuntas Pueblo in the early 20th century

== See also ==
- Pueblos in Puerto Rico
- List of communities in Puerto Rico
