= Washington Irving Graded School =

- U.S. National Register of Historic Places
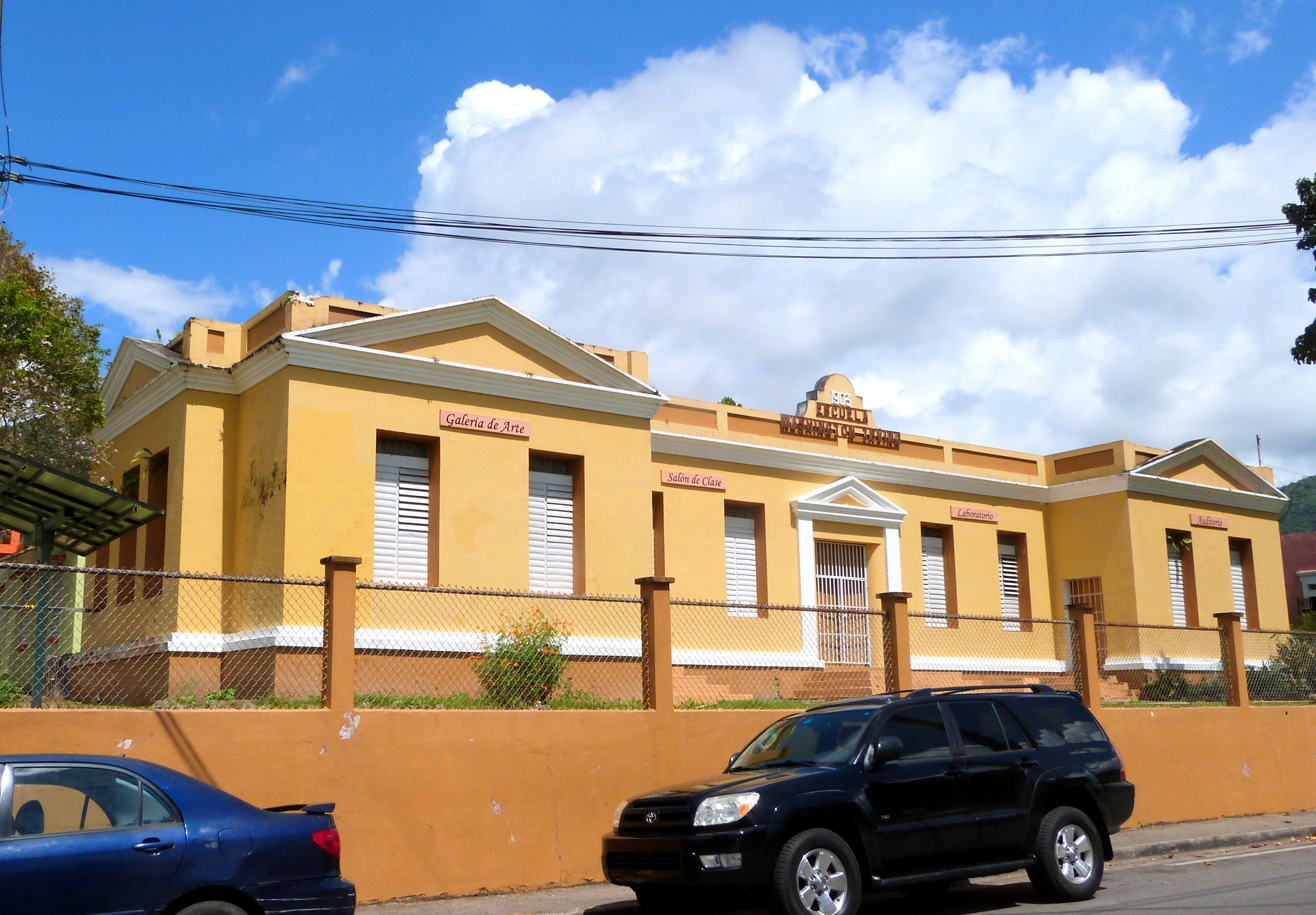
- Washington Irving School in 2017

- Location within Puerto Rico
- Location: Junction of Rodulfo González and Martínez de Andino streets in downtown Adjuntas, Puerto Rico
- Coordinates: 18°9′42″N 66°43′20″W
- Built: 1903
- Architect: Charles G. Post
- Architectural style: Late 19th and Early 20th Century American Movements architecture
- NRHP reference No.: 15000274
- Added to NRHP: May 26, 2015

The Washington Irving Graded School (Spanish: Escuela Washington Irving) is a historic school located in Adjuntas Pueblo, the historic and administrative center of the municipality of Adjuntas in central Puerto Rico. The school was named after short-story writer Washington Irving, famous for works such as "Rip Van Winkle" (1819) and "The Legend of Sleepy Hollow" (1820). It was added to the National Register of Historic Places in 2015 due to its historic architectural importance.

The 1903 school is a one-story, four-classroom, C-shaped, brick and masonry, Neoclassical flat-with-parapet-concrete-roofed building located one block southeast from the main town square of Adjuntas. This is the oldest school building in Adjuntas and one of the oldest school buildings in Puerto Rico, in addition to being one of the educational institutions built under the United States administration in the island.

== See also ==
- National Register of Historic Places listings in Adjuntas, Puerto Rico
