= Humacao District Courthouse =

- U.S. National Register of Historic Places
- Puerto Rico Historic Sites and Zones
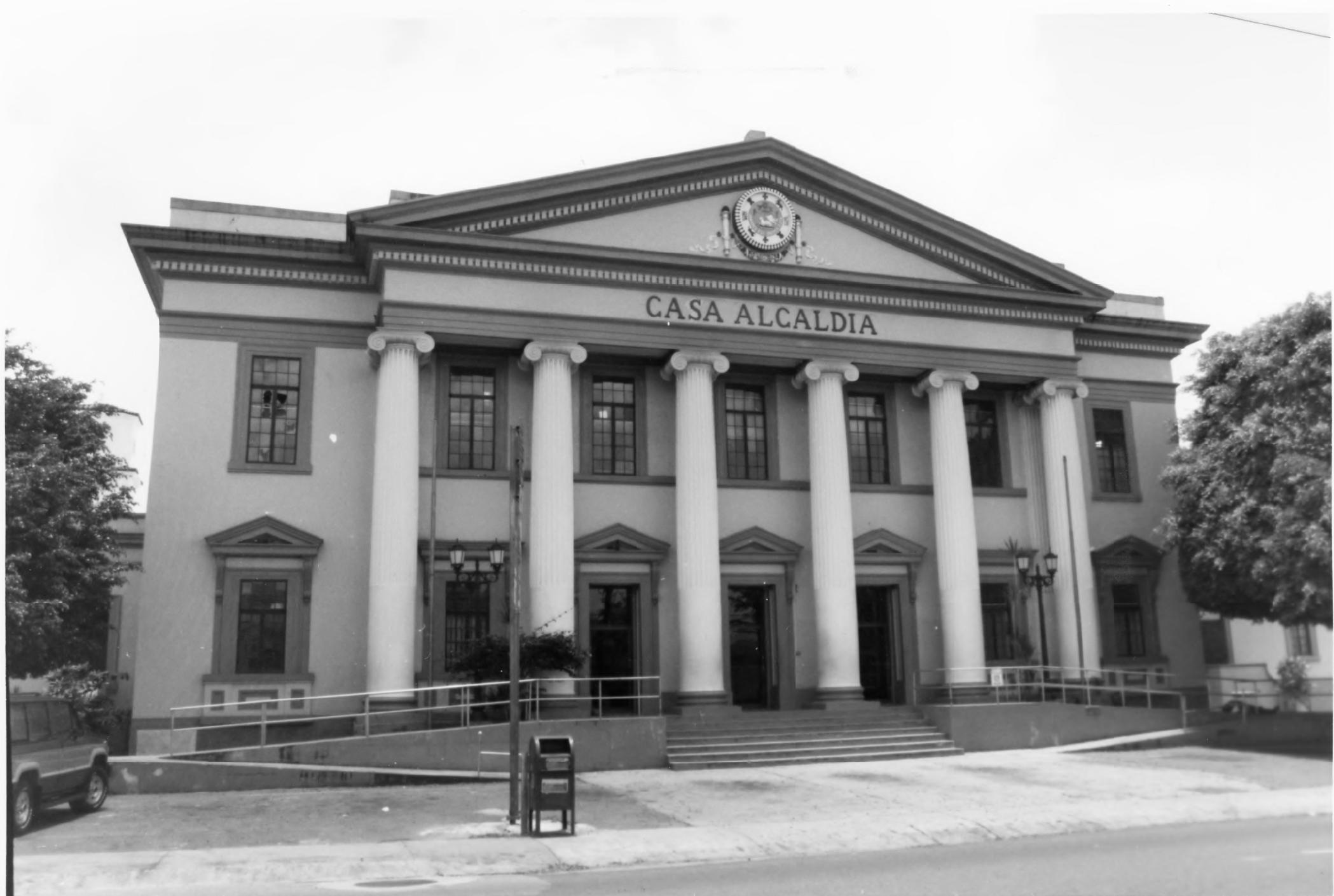
- The courthouse, now city hall in 1995.
- Location: Junction of Dr. Vidal and Antonio López Streets Humacao, Puerto Rico
- Coordinates: 18°8′58″N 65°49′27″W
- Built: 1925
- Architect: Rafael Carmoega
- Architectural style: Neoclassical
- NRHP reference No.: 95000596
- RNSZH No.: 2000-(RE)-18-JP-SH

Significant dates
- Added to NRHP: May 18, 1995
- Designated RNSZH: May 16, 2001

The Old District Courthouse of Humacao (Spanish: Antiguo Tribunal de Distrito de Humacao) is a historic two-story concrete government building constructed in 1925 in the Neoclassical style located in Humacao Pueblo (downtown Humacao), in the Puerto Rican municipality of the same name. The building was designed by famed Puerto Rico State Architect Rafael Carmoega and built by the Public Buildings Division of the Department of Public Works.

It is the most significant public building constructed by the former United States Territorial Government of Puerto Rico in the municipality of Humacao, and it is an excellent example of the new Federal style of architecture, as applied to courthouses, which were constructed throughout the Puerto Rico during the 1920s. The building served as a district courthouse continuously until 1967, when it was transferred to the local government. It served as the municipality's city hall and civic center until construction of the current city hall building, the Centro De Gobierno Municipal Atanasio Martínez Díaz, was completed in 2005. The building today is still administered by the municipality, and it serves as a cultural center and arts museum.

It was added to the United States National Register of Historic Places in 1995, and to the Puerto Rico Register of Historic Sites and Zones on May 16, 2001.
