= María Dávila Semidey School =

- U.S. National Register of Historic Places
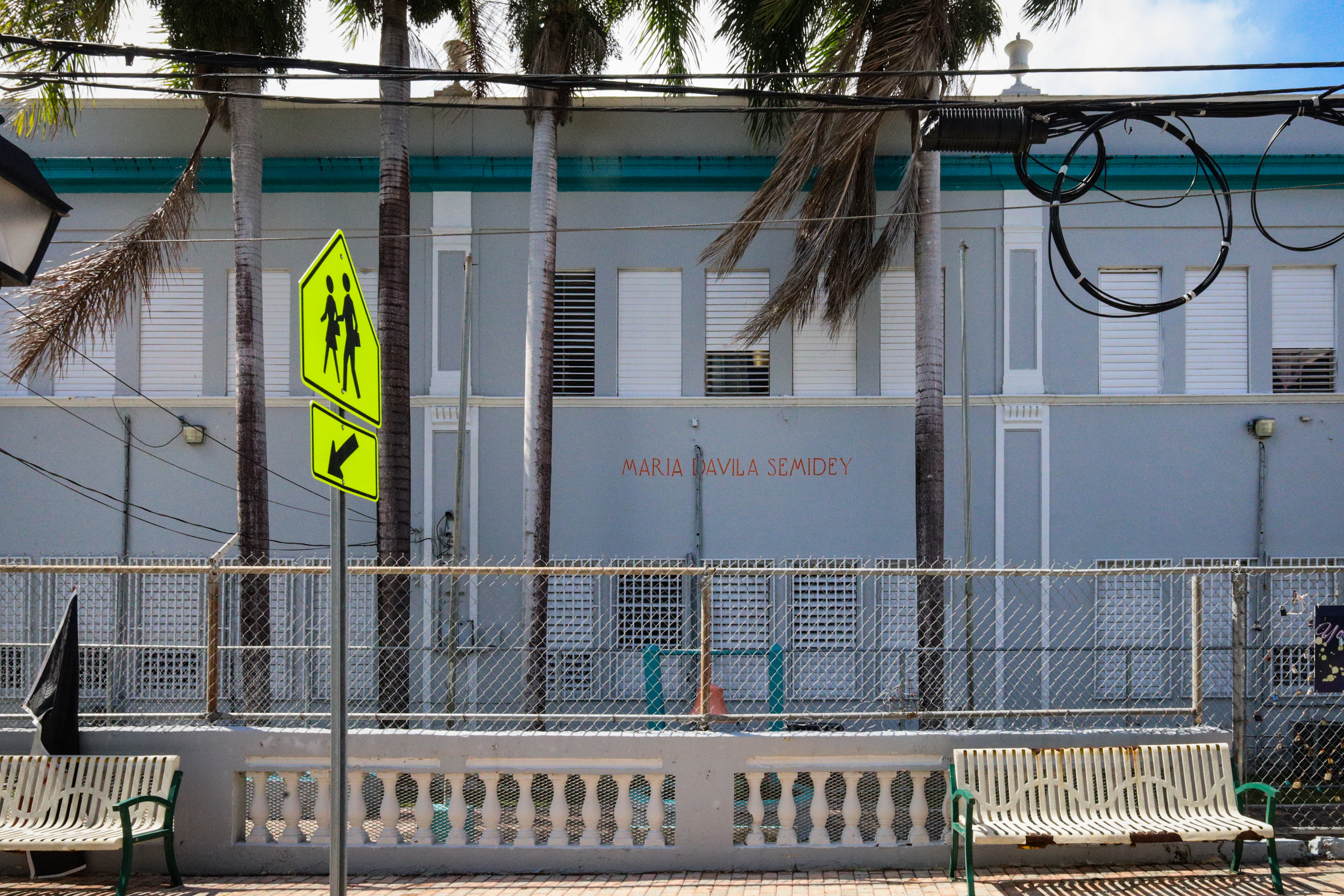
- The school in 2025

- Location within Puerto Rico
- Location: 300 Muñoz Rivera St., Patillas, Puerto Rico
- Coordinates: 18°00′21″N 66°01′01″W
- Built: 1925
- Architect: Francisco Gardon Vega
- Architectural style: Mission/Spanish Revival
- NRHP reference No.: 12000939
- Added to NRHP: November 14, 2012

The María Dávila Semidey School, at 300 Muñoz Rivera St., Patillas, Puerto Rico. The school was designed by Architect Francisco Gardón Vega. The school building was designed in the Mission Spanish Revival style and built in 1925. It was added to the United States National Register of Historic Places on November 14, 2012.
