= Antonia Sáez School =

School in Humacao, Puerto Rico

- U.S. National Register of Historic Places
- Puerto Rico Historic Sites and Zones
- Location within Puerto Rico
- Location: Junction of Font Martelo and Isidro Ortiz Streets Humacao, Puerto Rico
- Coordinates: 18°9′6″N 65°49′49″W
- Built: 1922
- Architect: Rafael Carmoega, Fidel Sevillano
- Architectural style: Mission/Spanish Revival
- NRHP reference No.: 95000597
- RNSZH No.: 2000-(RE)-18-JP-SH

Significant dates
- Added to NRHP: May 18, 1995
- Designated RNSZH: May 16, 2001

The Antonia Sáez School (Spanish: Escuela Antonia Sáez) is a former school located in Humacao, Puerto Rico. The Mission/Spanish Revival school building was added to the United States National Register of Historic Places in 1995, and to the Puerto Rico Register of Historic Sites and Zones on May 16, 2001. The structure also served as a marketplace (plaza del mercado) between 1966 and 2004.
