= Daniel Webster School =

Historic building in Peñuelas, Puerto Rico

- U.S. National Register of Historic Places
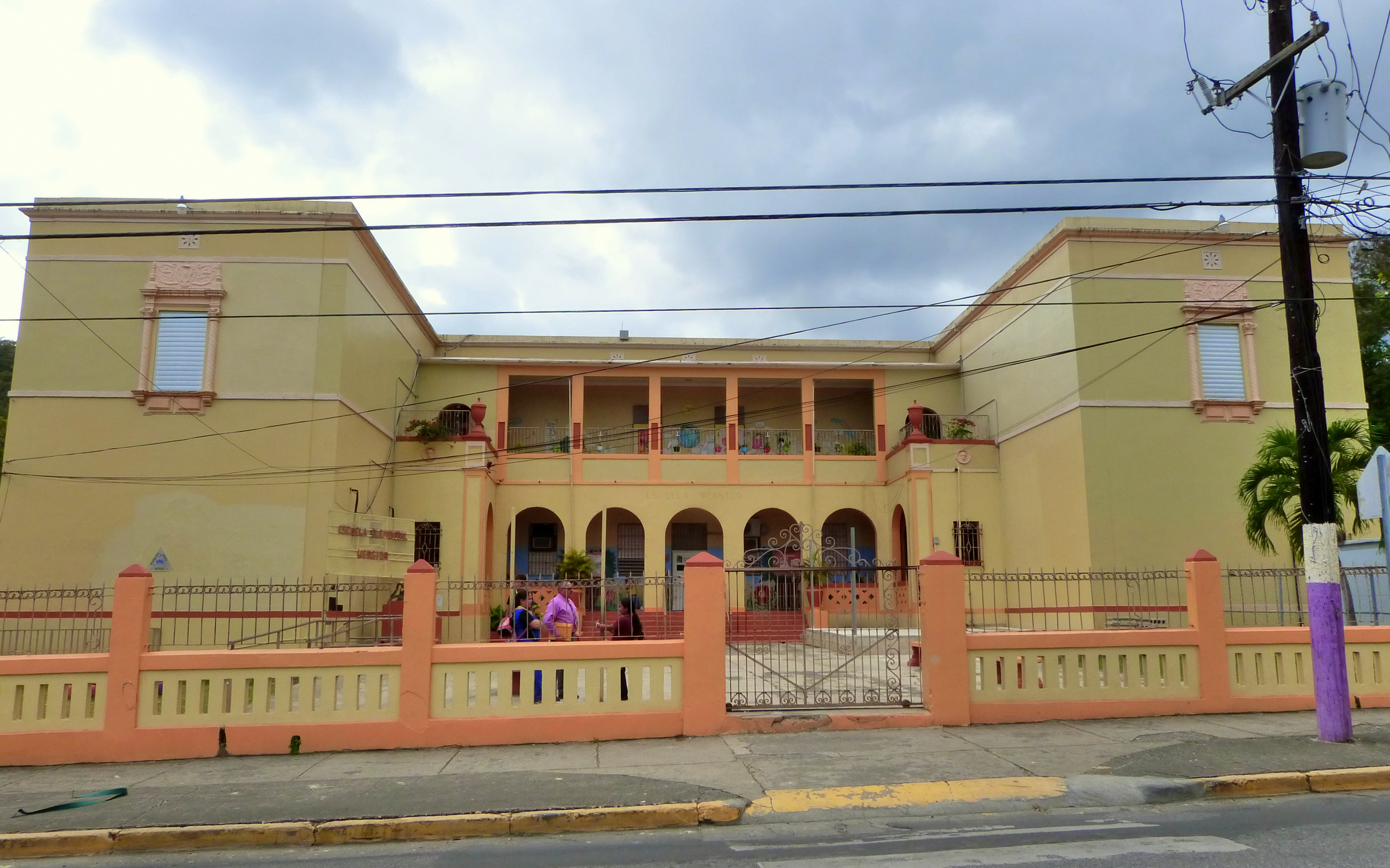

- Location within Puerto Rico
- Location: 255 Luis Muñoz Rivera Street, Peñuelas Pueblo, Peñuelas, Puerto Rico
- Coordinates: 18.054495°N 66.722086°W
- Area: .15 acres (0.061 ha)
- Built: 1927, 1934
- Built by: Gabino Balasquide
- Architect: Francisco Gardón Vega, Rafael Carmoega
- Architectural style: Beaux Arts, Spanish Revival
- MPS: Early Twentieth Century Schools in Puerto Rico TR
- NRHP reference No.: 12000940
- Added to NRHP: November 14, 2012

The Daniel Webster School, also known as Escuela Daniel Webster and as La Webster, in Peñuelas Pueblo, Peñuelas, Puerto Rico, was built in 1927 and expanded in 1934. It was listed on the National Register of Historic Places in 2012.

It was deemed significant for its architecture. It was asserted in its NRHP nomination that "Escuela Webster exemplifies the joint adoption (if not always academically accurate) of Beaux Arts and Spanish Revival styles as a legitimate architectural idiom."

It is a two-story reinforced concrete building with an H-shaped plan. It was designed by Francisco Gardón Vega, as indicated in construction documents, although Rafael Carmoega, then Chief Architect for the Division of Public Works of Puerto Rico's Department of the Interior Office, is the architect of record per a plaque in the building. It was built by contractor Gabino Balasquide.
