= José Fontán School =

- U.S. National Register of Historic Places
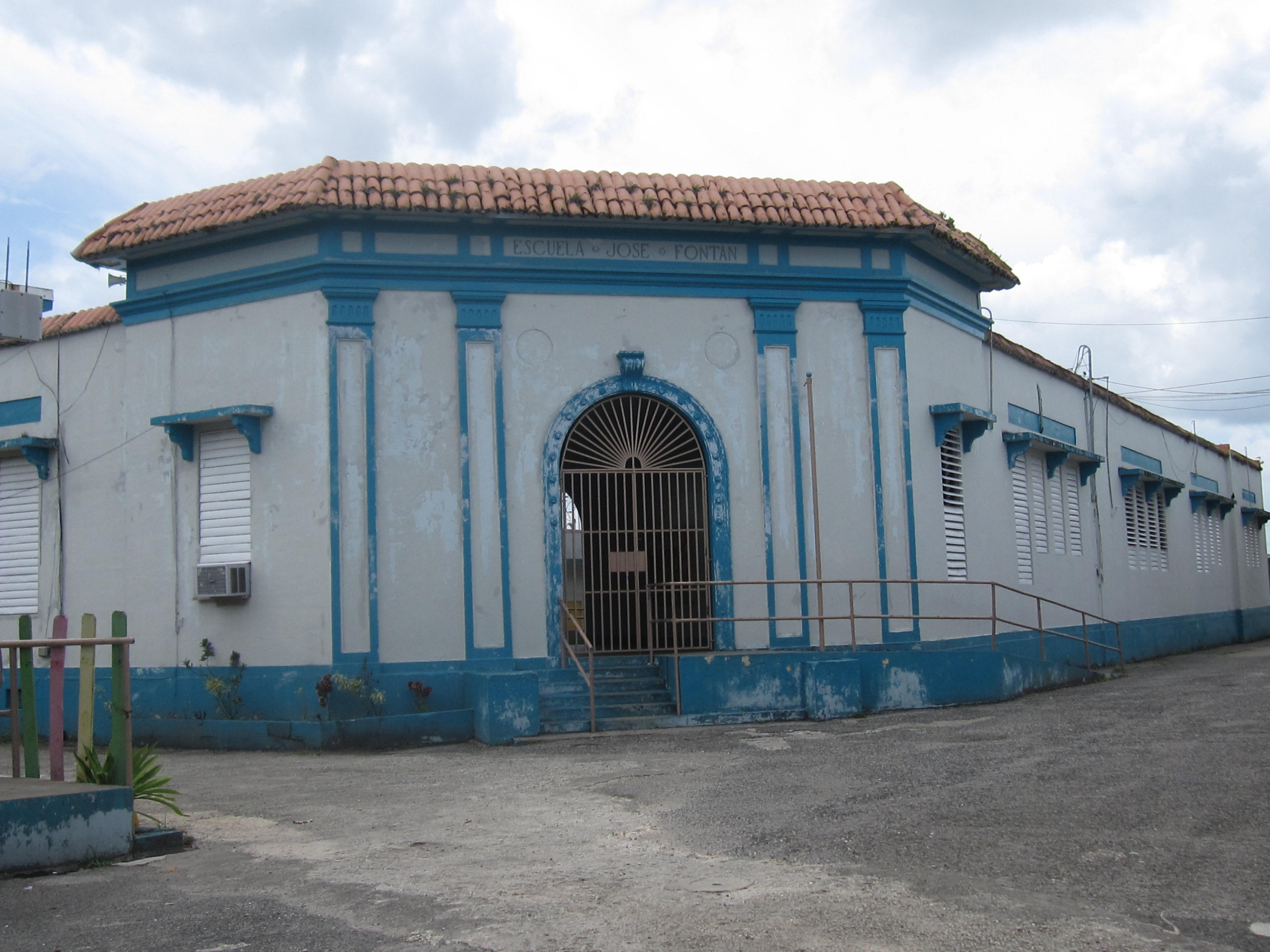
- José Fontán School in 2019.

- Location within Puerto Rico
- Location: Junction of Del Carmen and Principal streets Morovis Pueblo, Morovis, Puerto Rico
- Coordinates: 18°19′34″N 66°24′32″W
- Built: 1928
- Architect: Rafael Carmoega, Joseph O'Kelly, Puerto Rico & American Insurance Co.
- Architectural style: Late 19th and 20th Century Mission Revival
- MPS: Early Twentieth Century Schools in Puerto Rico TR
- NRHP reference No.: 12000582
- Added to NRHP: August 28, 2012

The José Fontán School (Spanish: Escuela José Fontán) is a historic early 20th-century school located in Morovis Pueblo, the administrative and historic center of the municipality of Morovis, Puerto Rico. The school building was added to the National Register of Historic Places in August 2012 due to its architectural importance as a prime example of the Late 19th and Early 20th Century American Movements architecture, particularly the Mission/Spanish Revival style, under the Early Twentieth Century Schools in Puerto Rico TR. The building was designed by Puerto Rican architect Rafael Carmoega and by Joseph O'Kelly from the Puerto Rico & American Insurance Co.

== See also ==
- National Register of Historic Places listings in central Puerto Rico
