= Francisco Gardón Vega =

Puerto Rican architect

Francisco Gardón Vega (January 11, 1891 – 1938) was an architect born in Puerto Rico.

== Biography ==
He was born in San Juan, Puerto Rico, on January 11, 1891. He worked as a draftsperson in Puerto Rico for the Department of the Interior from 1909 to 1912. He studied architecture at the Carnegie Institute of Technology in Pittsburgh, Pennsylvania, but did not complete his studies there. After moving to New York in 1915, he worked for several architectural and engineering offices. He enrolled at the American School of Correspondence and graduated with an architect's certificate in 1921.

"Like other early 20th century architects, Francisco Gardón Vega was eclectic in manner. His designs refused adherence to a single stylistic expression, combining ornamental features at will to express architecture as a polyvalent language."

Several of his works are listed on the National Register of Historic Places (NRHP)

Works include:

- Daniel Webster School (1926), Peñuelas, Puerto Rico, NRHP-listed
- María Dávila Semidey School (1929–30), in Patillas, Puerto Rico, NRHP-listed
- José M. Gallardo High School (1927), in Juncos, Puerto Rico, NRHP-listed
- Andrés Flores López School (1928), in Canóvanas, Puerto Rico
- Rafael Nicolau School (1930), in Aguas Buenas, Puerto Rico
- Escuela Eugenio María de Hostos (1930), in Las Marías, Puerto Rico, NRHP-listed
