= Morovis barrio-pueblo =

Historical and administrative center (seat) of Morovis, Puerto Rico

Morovis barrio-pueblo Pueblo de Morovis
- Municipality Seat
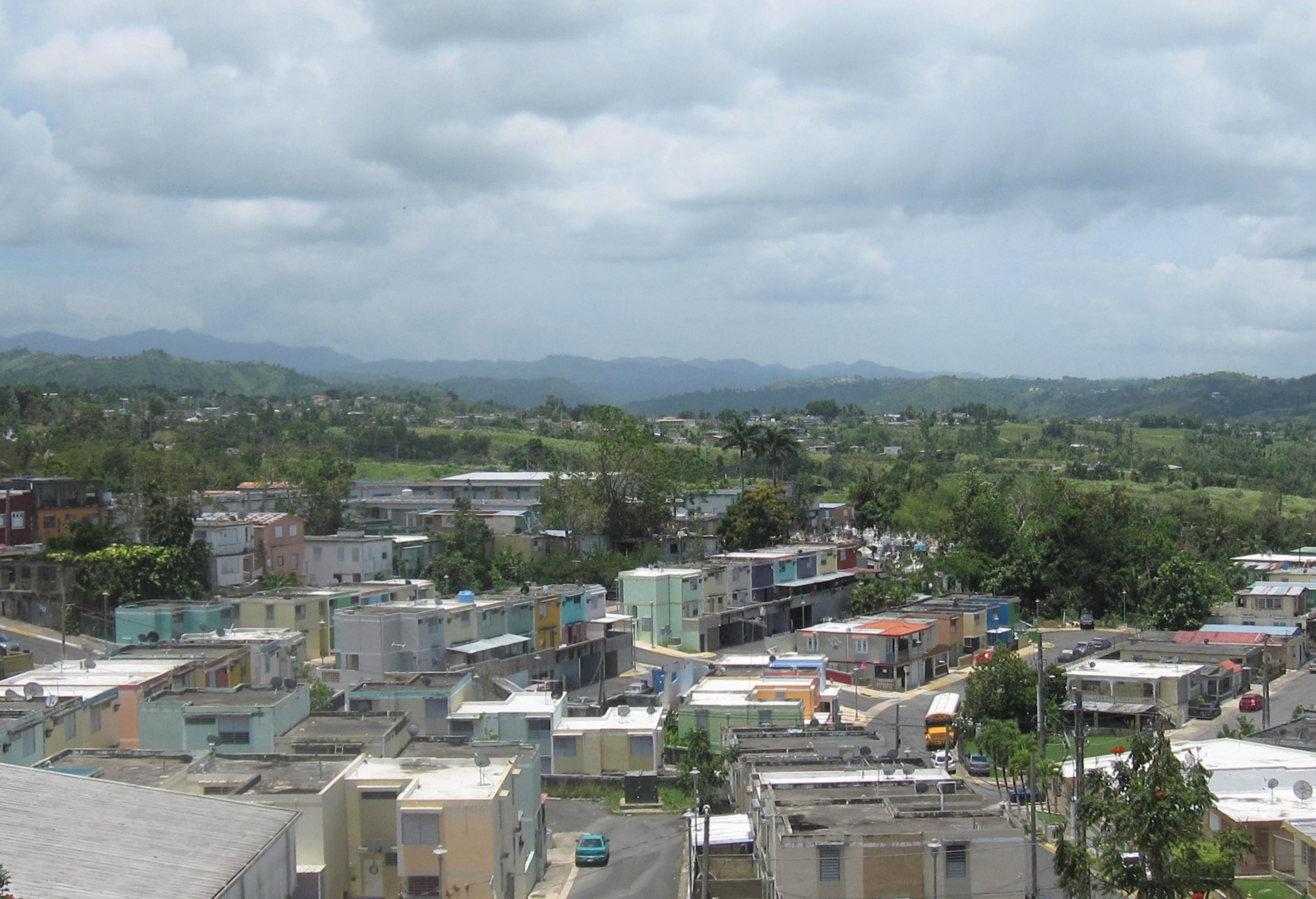
- View of Morovis barrio-pueblo

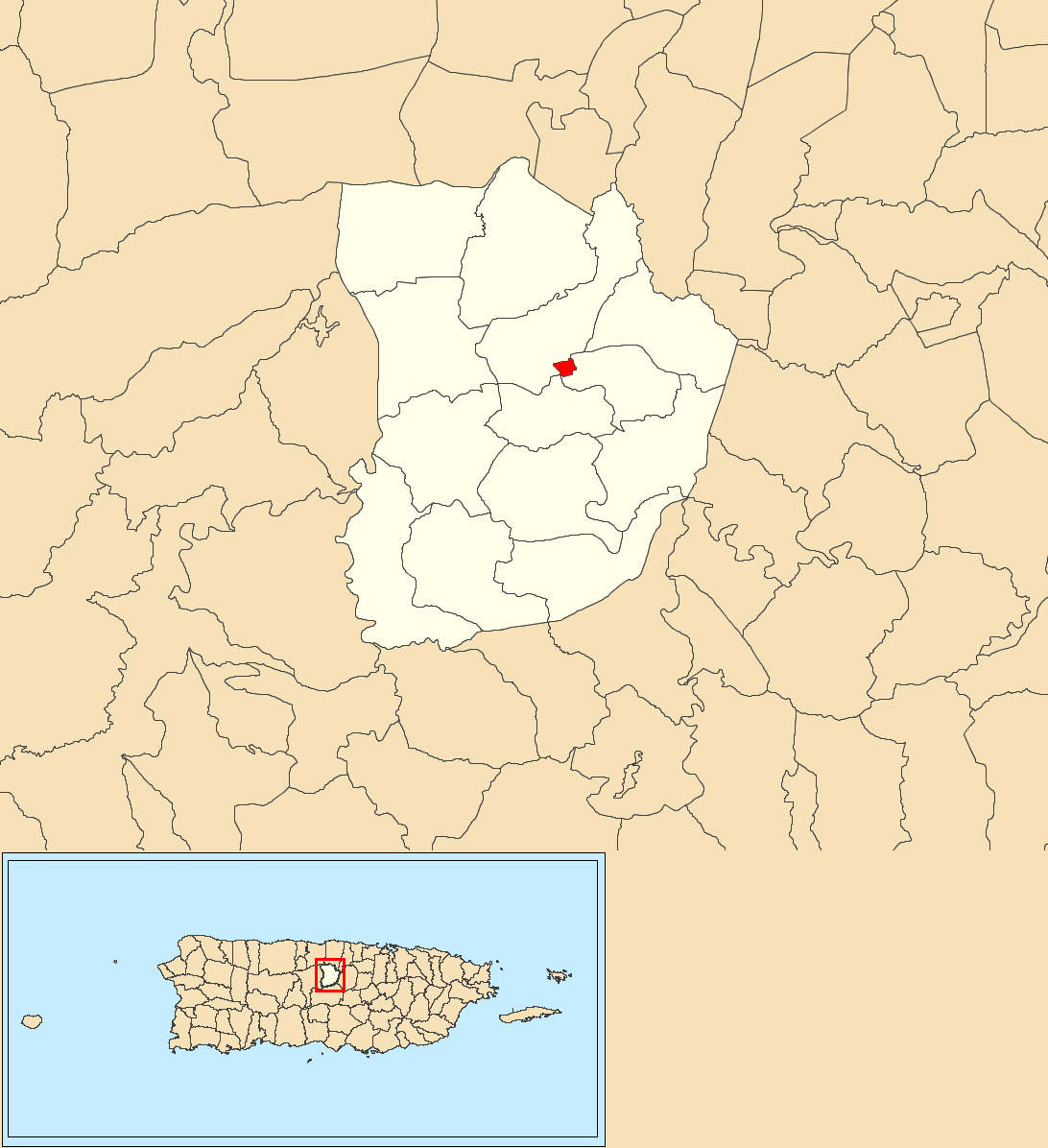
- Location of Morovis barrio-pueblo within the municipality of Morovis shown in red

- Location of Puerto Rico
- Coordinates: 18°19′34″N 66°24′28″W
- Commonwealth: Puerto Rico
- Municipality: Morovis

Area
  - Total: 0.07 sq mi (0.18 km^{2})
  - Land: 0.07 sq mi (0.18 km^{2})
  - Water: 0 sq mi (0 km^{2})
- Elevation: 689 ft (210 m)

Population (2010)
  - Total: 895
  - Density: 12,785.7/sq mi (4,936.6/km^{2})
- Source: 2010 Census
- Time zone: UTC−4 (AST)
- Zip code: 00687

Morovis barrio-pueblo is a barrio and the administrative center (seat) of Morovis, a municipality of Puerto Rico. Morovis barrio-pueblo has about 12 sectors and its population in 2010 was 895.

As was customary in Spain, in Puerto Rico, the municipality has a barrio called pueblo which contains a central plaza, the municipal buildings (city hall), and a Catholic church. Fiestas patronales (patron saint festivals) are held in the central plaza every year.

== The central plaza and its church ==
The central plaza, or square, is a place for official and unofficial recreational events and a place where people can gather and socialize from dusk to dawn. The Laws of the Indies, Spanish law, which regulated life in Puerto Rico in the early 19th century, stated the plaza's purpose was for "the parties" (celebrations, festivities) (Spanish: a propósito para las fiestas), and that the square should be proportionally large enough for the number of neighbors (Spanish: grandeza proporcionada al número de vecinos). These Spanish regulations also stated that the streets nearby should be comfortable portals for passersby, protecting them from the elements: sun and rain.

Located across the central plaza in Morovis barrio-pueblo is the Parroquia Nuestra Señora del Carmen, a Roman Catholic church.

José Fontán School, a building on the National Register of Historic Places is at the central plaza as well.

== History ==
Morovis barrio-pueblo was in Spain's gazetteers until Puerto Rico was ceded by Spain in the aftermath of the Spanish–American War under the terms of the Treaty of Paris of 1898 and became an unincorporated territory of the United States. In 1899, the United States Department of War conducted a census of Puerto Rico finding that the population of Morovis Pueblo was 1,064.

Historical population
Census	Pop.	Note	%±
1900	1,064		—
1910	1,063		−0.1%
1920	1,218		14.6%
1930	1,982		62.7%
1940	2,157		8.8%
1950	2,434		12.8%
1960	2,428		−0.2%
1970	0		−100.0%
1980	1,457		—
1990	1,157		−20.6%
2000	1,004		−13.2%
2010	895		−10.9%
U.S. Decennial Census; 1899 (shown as 1900) 1910-1930; 1930-1950 1980-2000 2010

== Sectors ==
Barrios (which are, in contemporary times, roughly comparable to minor civil divisions) in turn are further subdivided into smaller local populated place areas/units called sectores (sectors in English). The types of sectores may vary, from normally sector to urbanización to reparto to barriada to residencial, among others.

The following sectors are in Morovis barrio-pueblo:

Avenida Buena Vista (Flamboyán), Avenida Corozal, Barriada Ensanche, Barriada Santo Domingo, Calle Baldorioty Final (Acueducto), Extensión Baldorioty, Sector Buenos Aires, Sector La Marina, Sector Pellejas, Sector Vietnam, Tramo Carretera 159 (Carol & Joe), and Urbanización Jardines de Flamboyán.

== Gallery ==
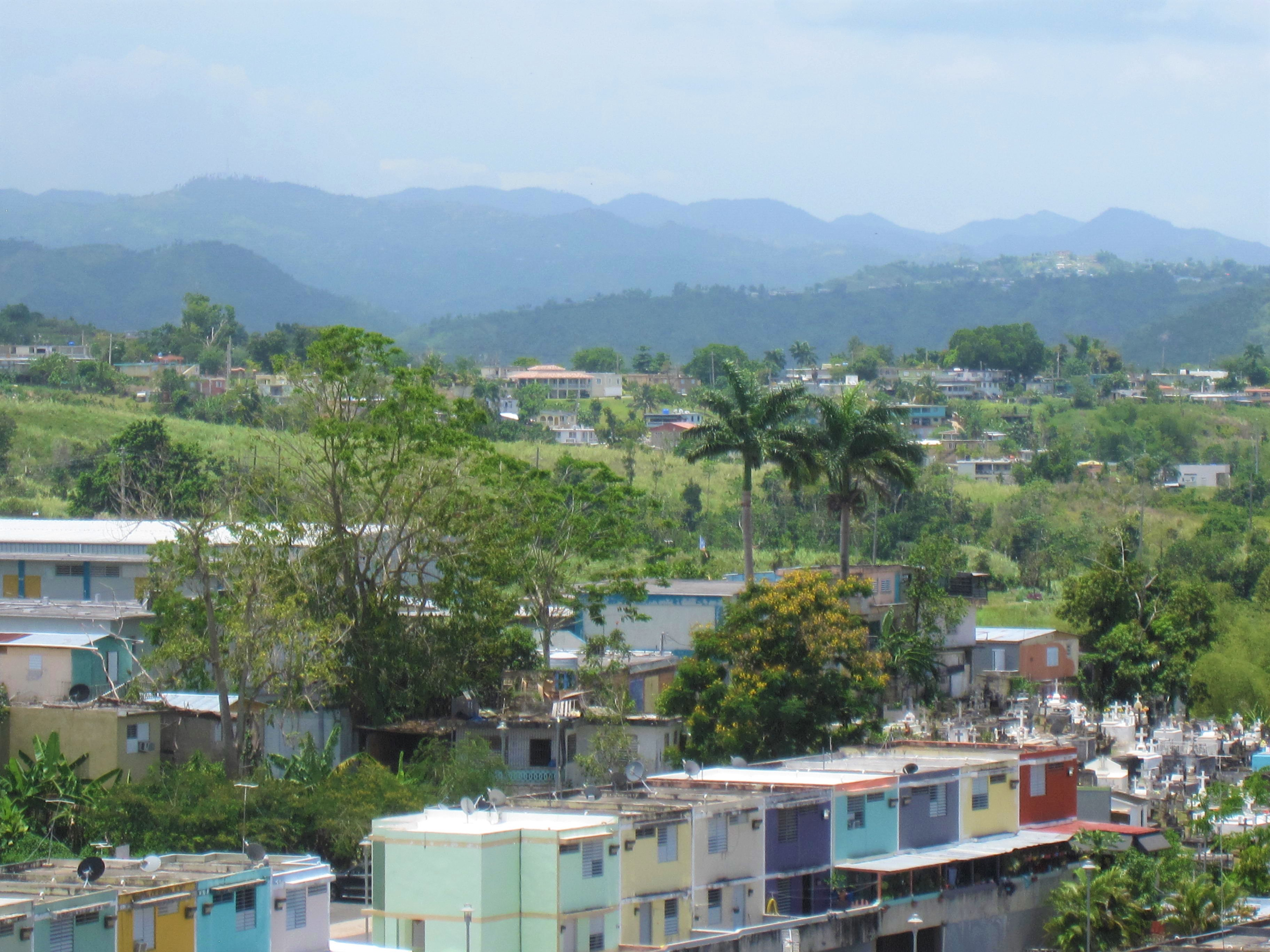
Morovis barrio-pueblo view from PR-155

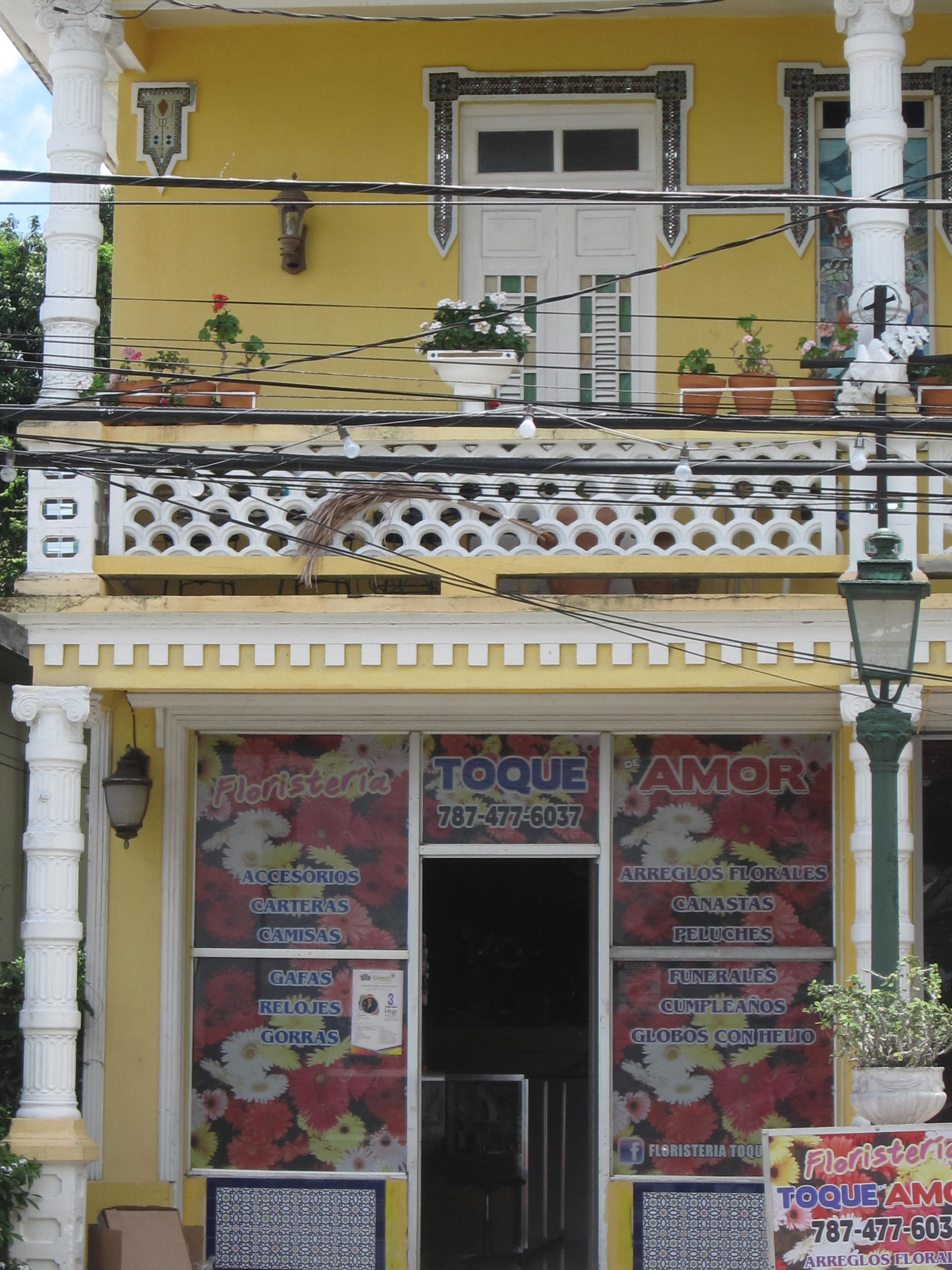
Store in Morovis barrio-pueblo

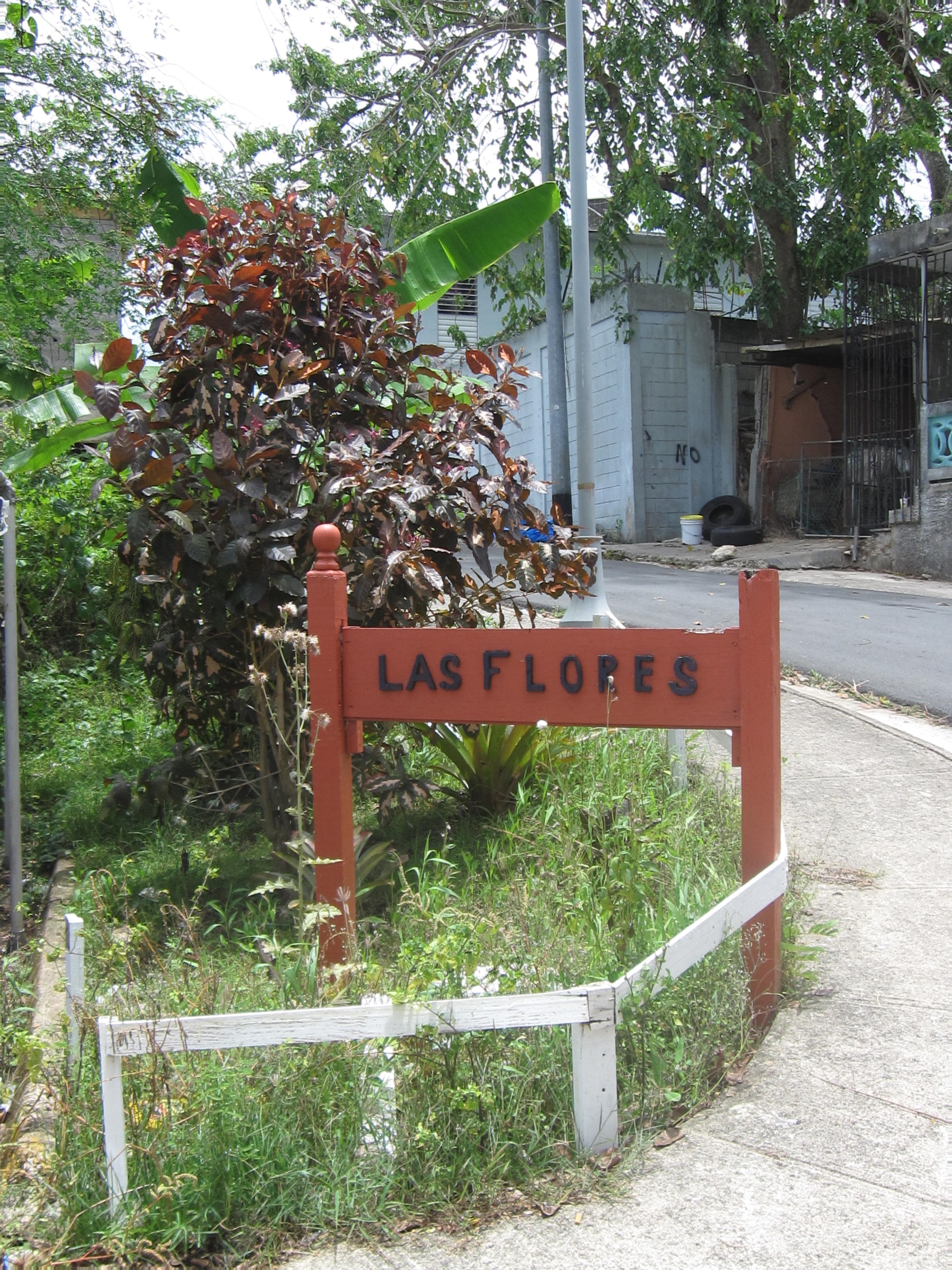
Las Flores neighborhood in barrio-pueblo

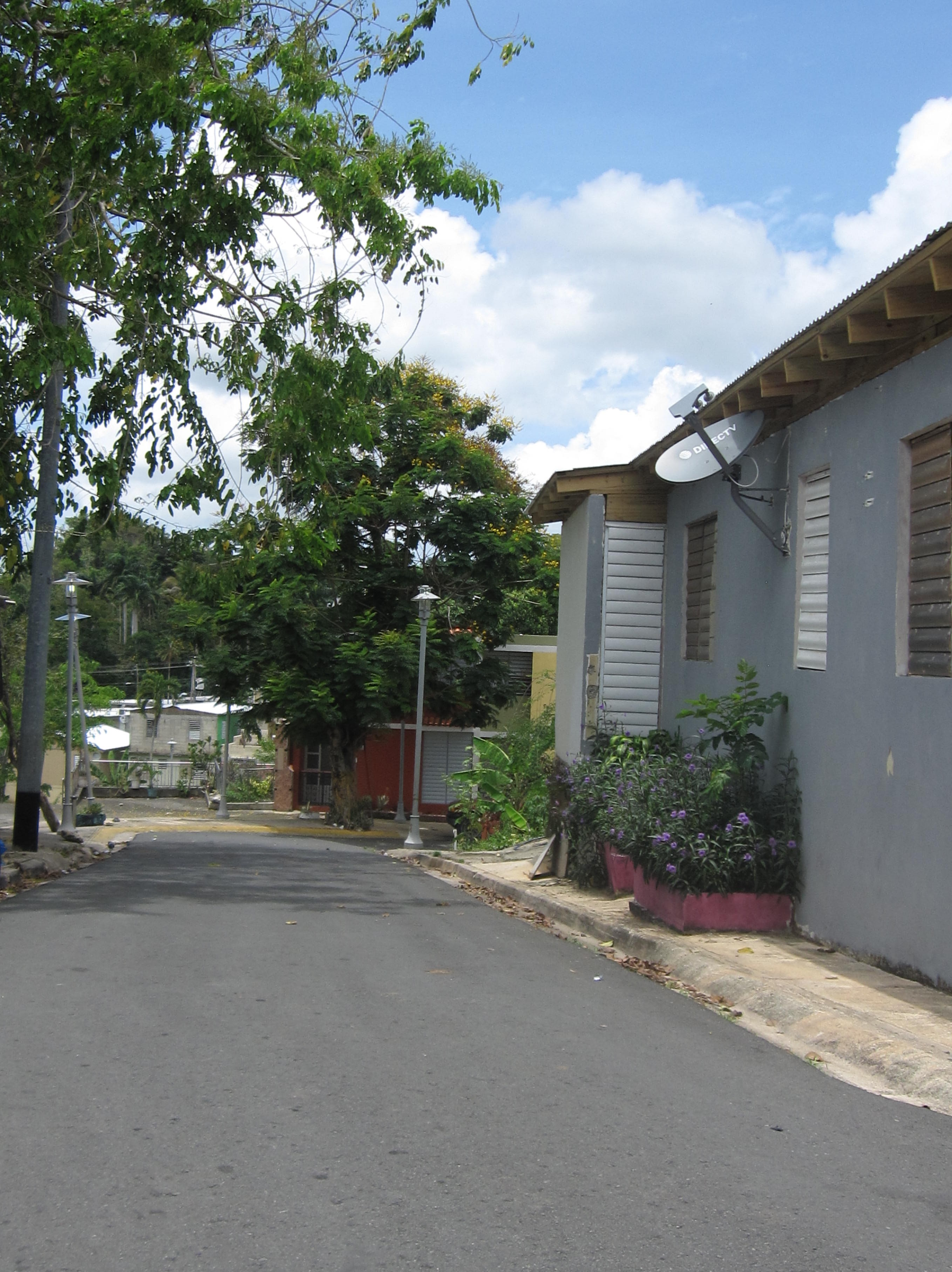
Morovis barrio-pueblo near José Fontán school

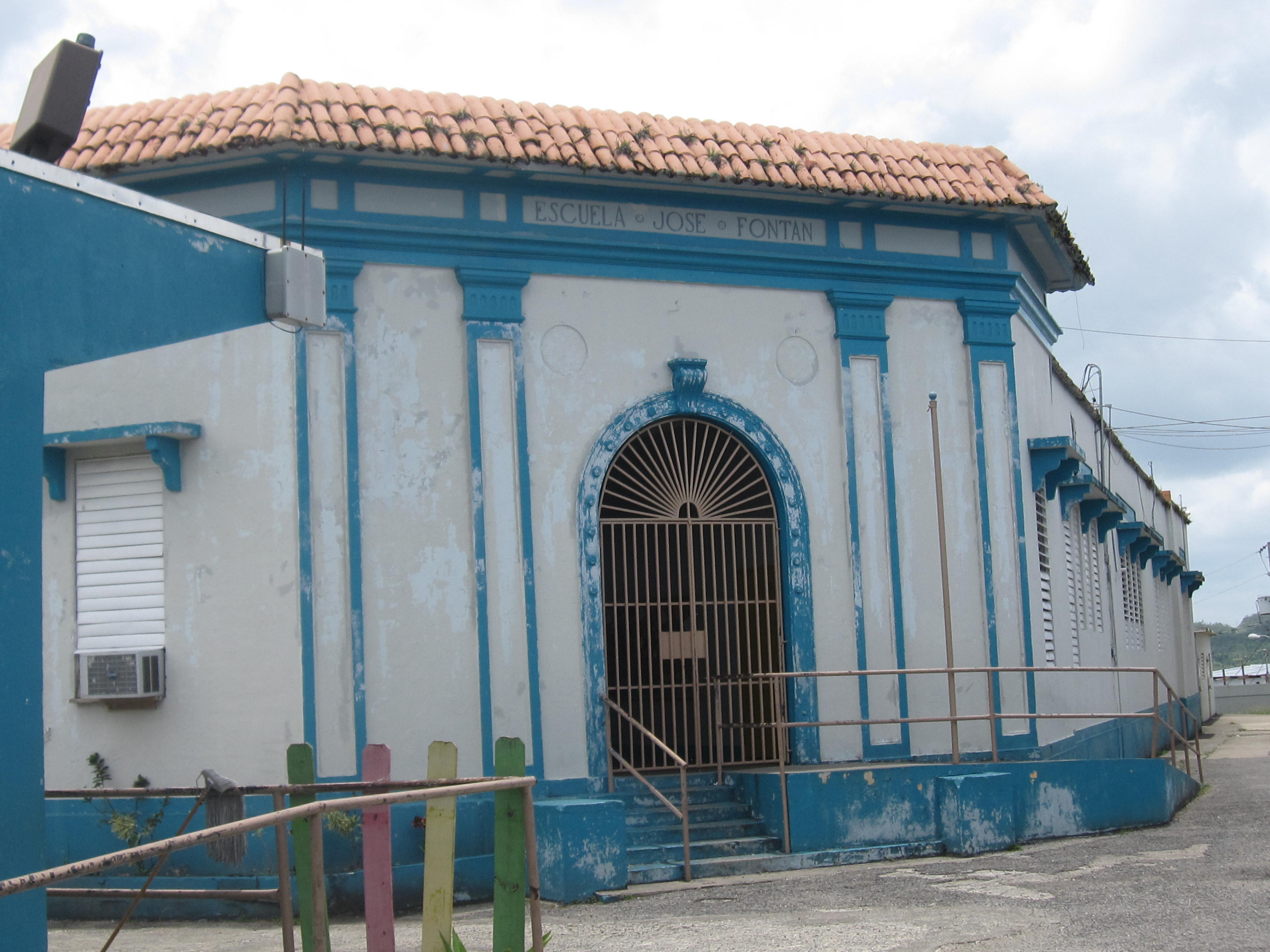
José Fontán School, listed on the National Register of Historic Places

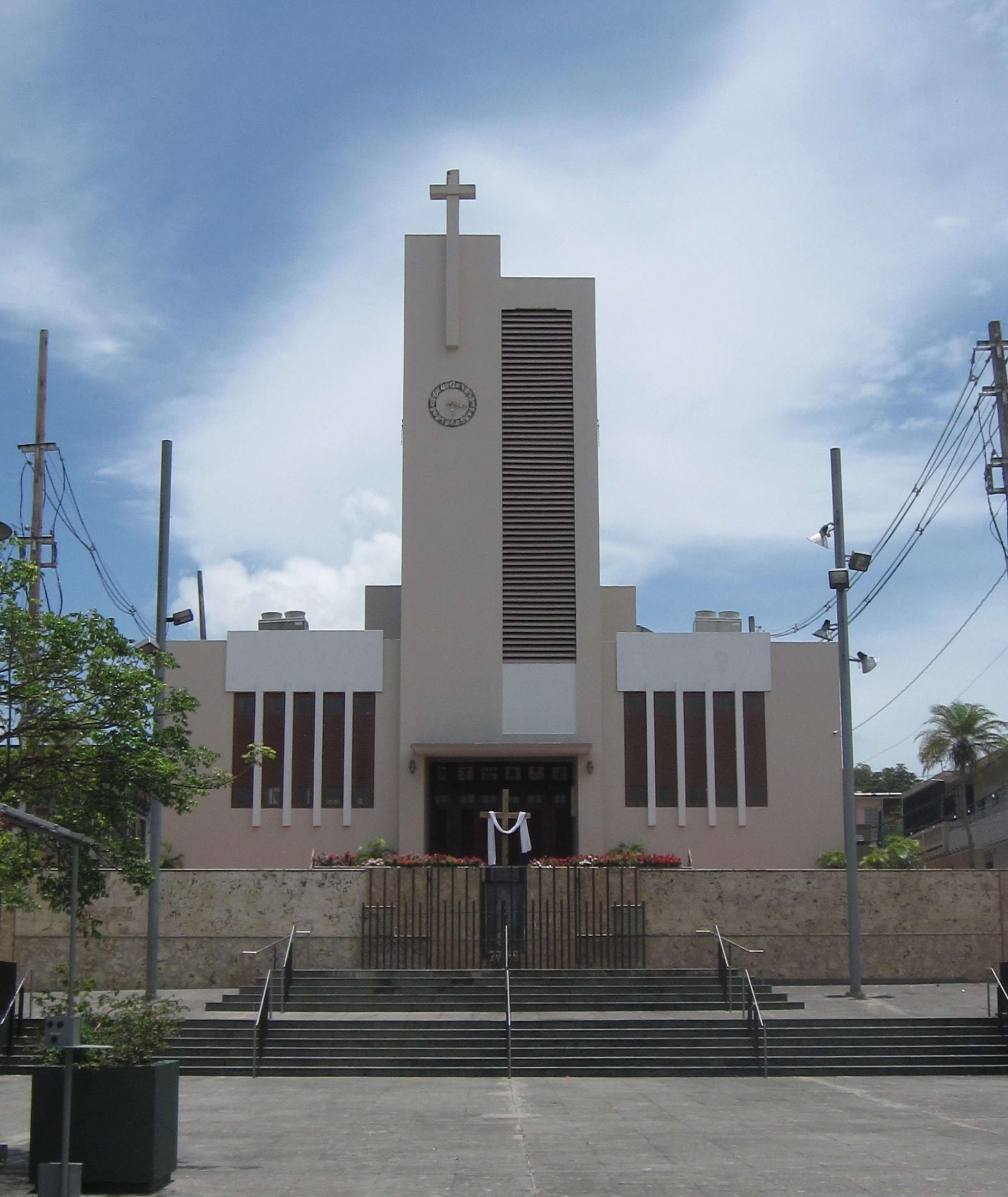
Catholic church in Morovis central plaza

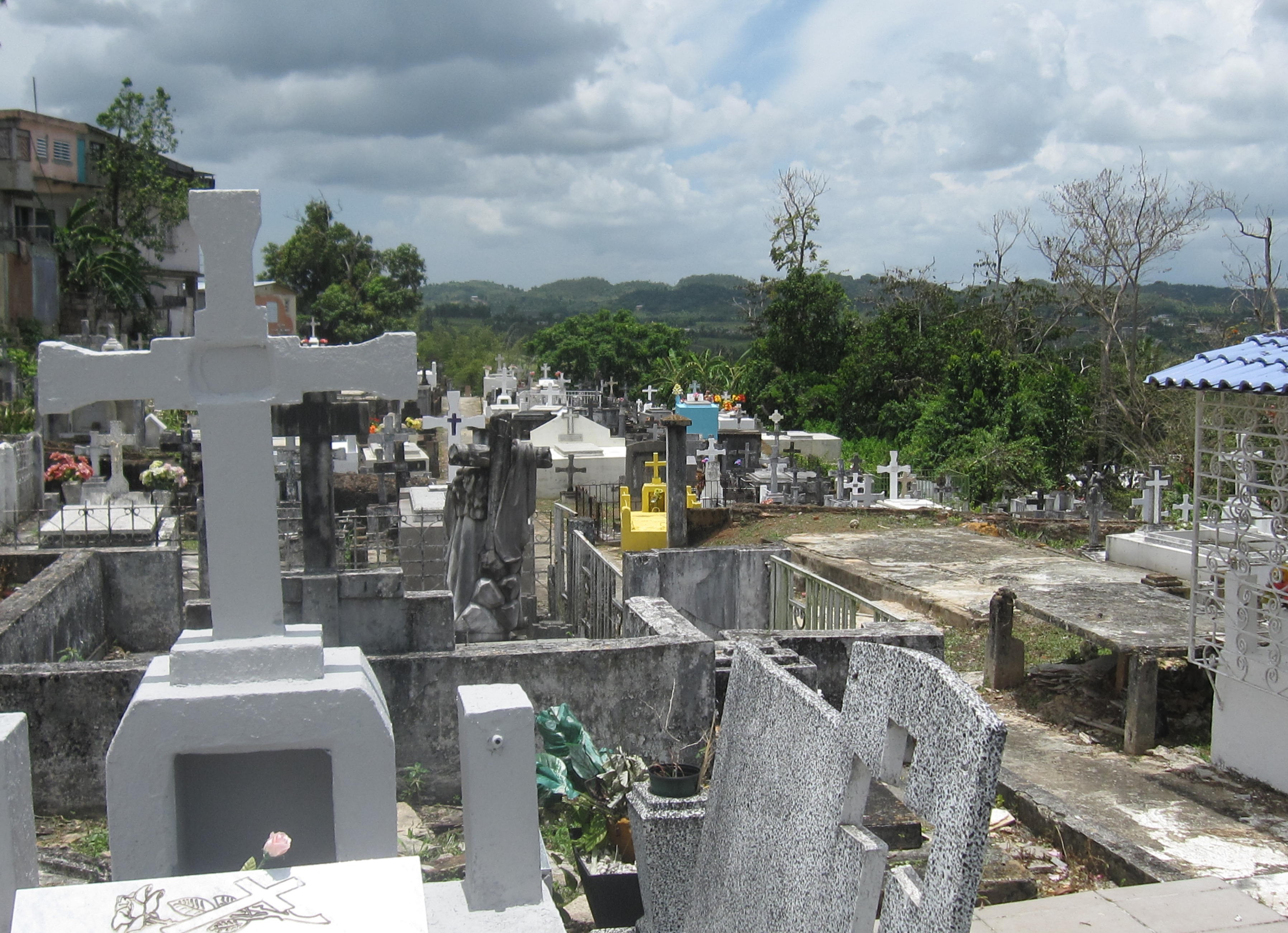
Municipal Cemetery of Morovis

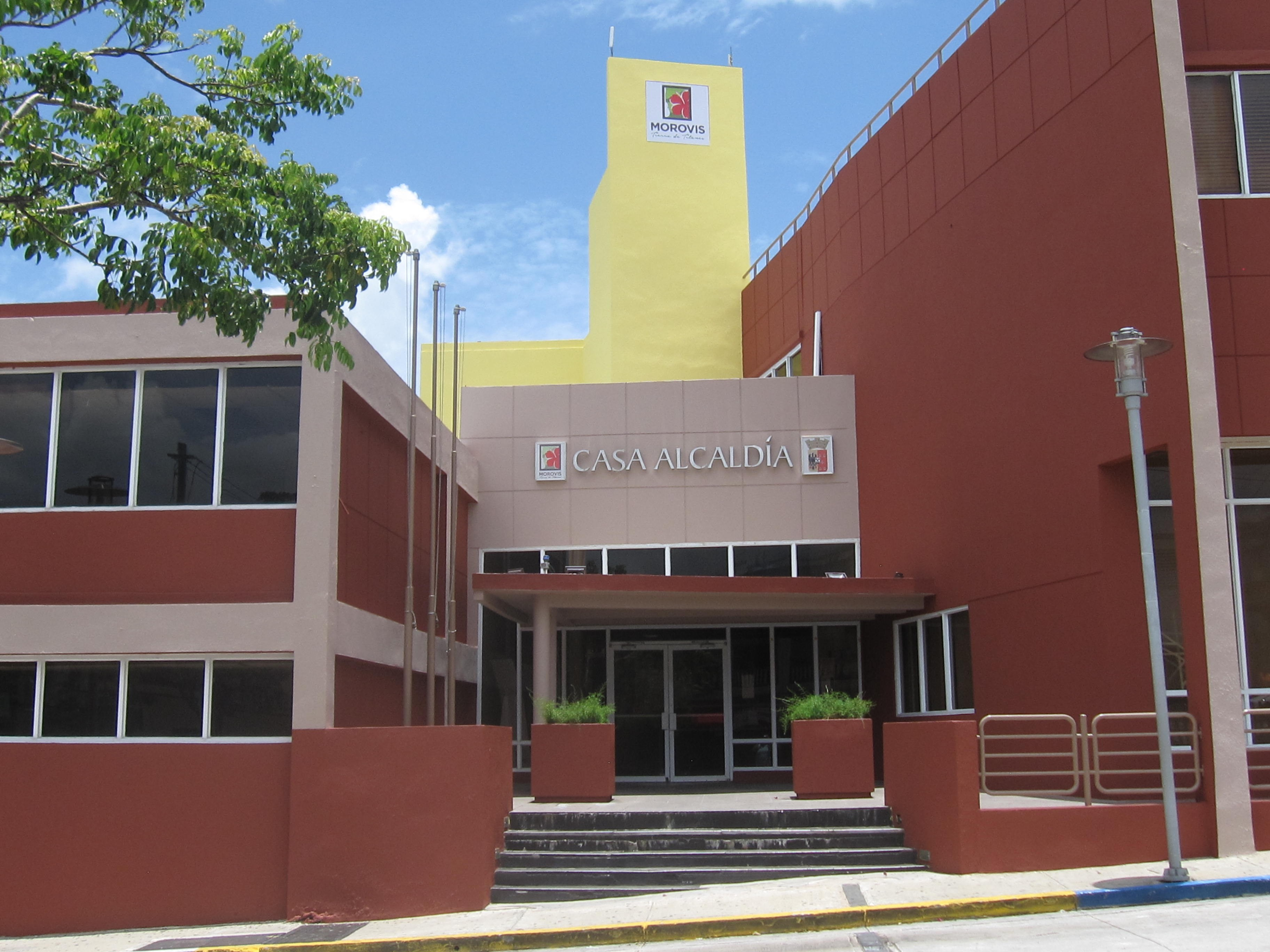
Town hall in Morovis Pueblo

== See also ==
- List of communities in Puerto Rico
- List of barrios and sectors of Morovis, Puerto Rico
