= El Cortijo (Barranquitas, Puerto Rico) =

House in Barranquitas, Puerto Rico

- U.S. National Register of Historic Places
- U.S. Historic district
- Puerto Rico Historic Sites and Zones
- Location within Puerto Rico
- Location: Highway 162, km 18.5 Barranquitas, Puerto Rico
- Coordinates: 18°10′57″N 66°18′35″W
- Built: 1939
- Architect: Rafael Carmoega
- Architectural style: Mission/Spanish Revival
- NRHP reference No.: 100002934
- RNSZH No.: 2003-41-01-JP-SH

Significant dates
- Added to NRHP: September 11, 2018
- Designated RNSZH: October 21, 2003

El Cortijo (Spanish for 'the farmhouse'), popularly known as Castillo El Cortijo, is a historic 1939 country house designed by famed Puerto Rican architect Rafael Carmoega. It is located on a hill that overlooks Barranquitas Pueblo, the administrative and historic center of the municipality of Barranquitas, Puerto Rico. It is the summer residence of the Lozana-Fabián family, associated with the sugarcane industry of the island and descendants of Spanish entrepreneur Rafael Fabián y Fabián. El Cortijo and its surrounding structures, gardens and paths were added to the National Register of Historic Places in 2018 as they are one of the most exemplary works of Rafael Carmoega along with the Capitol of Puerto Rico and the Roosevelt Tower and Quadrangle in the University of Puerto Rico, Río Piedras campus.

== History ==
El Cortijo was designed for the Lozana-Fabián family by Rafael Carmoega Morales, a graduate of architecture from Cornell University who worked as state architect in Puerto Rico between 1921 and 1936. It was design by Carmoega between October 1938 and July 1939, after the end of his government tenure. The residence was intended to be inspired by a Spanish suburban or rural villa, or so-called cortijo, for the Lozana-Fabián. Secundino Lozana Cepa and Josefina Fabián Finlay, the original owners of the country house, were sugarcane plantation administrators during the early-20th century sugar industry boom in Puerto Rico. Lozana Cepa was the son of Paulino Lozana Díaz and Rita Cepa, Asturian immigrants to Cuba who distinguished themselves as textile industry entrepreneurs. Their son, Lozana Cepa moved to Puerto Rico to manage Central Vannina in Río Piedras and Central Constancia in Toa Baja, and soon after became a member of the Board of Directors of the sugar company Corporación Azucarera del Toa. This was an extremely lucrative venture for the family until the 1950s when the sugarcane industry began to rapidly decline in the island. This country house is now owned by José Flores Santiago and Sheila Rivera Rojas. El Cortijo retains its architectural and cultural integrity to this day and, despite not being inhabited any longer, it has become a house museum and it was listed on the Puerto Rico Register of Historic Sites and Zones in 2003 and on the National Register of Historic Places in 2018.

== Architecture ==
El Cortijo was built in a Spanish Colonial Revival style, very popular during the first half of the 20th-century in Puerto Rico, with particular elements inspired by the Mission Revival style popularly used in private residences throughout the United States at the time, such as in California and Texas. The site consists of three different structures: the single-family country house, a garage and a gardener's cottage, in addition to numerous structures such as fountains, garden pathway and benches, all of which were also designed by Carmoega to integrate into the visual style of the residence. All of the structures were built with reinforced concrete while the roofs are made from terracotta tiles. The façade of the main house incorporates textured stuccos, exposed wooden beams and ojos de buey (bull's-eye) and air vents. These elements serve both as part of the structural composition and as ornamentation to the building. Other notable adornments include the coat of arms of Spain carved in stone in both above the main entrance and in the foyer, and a decorative bronze depiction of the Santa Maria caravel located atop of the building tower. The windows of the house contain both wood and iron that simulates the composition of wood, while the window shutters are all made of wood. Additional distinctive elements include the Tuscan-inspired columns and Moorish-inspired geometrical designs, archways and tilework. Another notable element is a tiled replica of the famous icon by Andreas Rizo de Candia of Our Lady of Perpetual Help (Nuestra Señora del Perpetuo Socorro) in the entrance foyer. The interior of the house is mostly Modernist, most notably its kitchen and bathrooms, despite the traditional Spanish-inspired exterior - although individual pieces of art and decoration inside the house still strongly reference the Spanish heritage that inspired it.

The country house and its surrounding structures harmoniously integrate into the hill they were built at, which provides panoramic views towards the town of Barranquitas and the surrounding Cordillera Central. The gardeners and caretakers of El Cortijo lived within the premises from 1939 to 1971 in a cottage also designed by Carmoega. The gardens include a plant nursery, vegetable orchards and gardening storage. One of the most famous denizens of the gardens is a large Ficus tree that was planted in 1939 by Jorge Berríos, the first gardener and caretaker of the property. The meticulous landscaping was a source of pride for the caretakers, with several interviews to the descendants describing their pride and affection for their work. The most common flowering plant in the garden were Begonias, which were very popular in landscaping at the time. Other plants and flowers in the garden included roses, cypress and pink manjack or roble blanco (Tabebuia heterophylla). Carmoega was highly inspired in the Catalonian modernism of Antoni Gaudí's Parc Güell evident in the design of the garden pathways, fountain, benches and, most notably, the trencadís in the property.

== See also ==
- Architecture of Puerto Rico
- National Register of Historic Places listings in central Puerto Rico
