= Edificio Alcaldia =

- U.S. National Register of Historic Places
- Puerto Rico Historic Sites and Zones
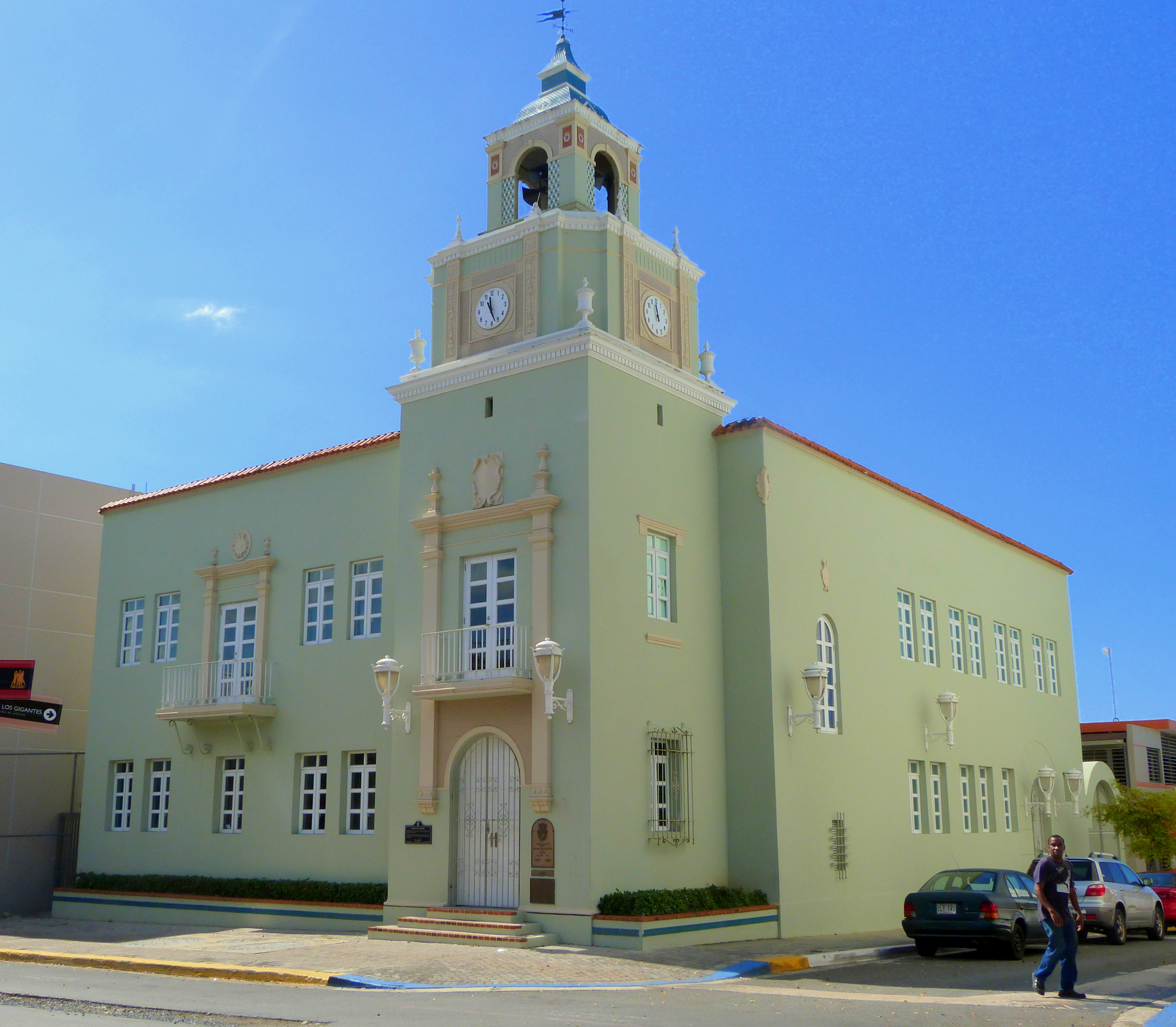

- Location within Puerto Rico
- Location: Carolina, Puerto Rico
- Coordinates: 18°22′53″N 65°57′27″W
- Built: 1930
- Architect: Rafael Carmoega
- Architectural style: Spanish architecture
- NRHP reference No.: 83004197
- RNSZH No.: 2000-(RMSJ)-00-JP-SH

Significant dates
- Added to NRHP: December 28, 1983
- Designated RNSZH: February 3, 2000

The Edificio Alcaldia (Spanish for ''city hall building''), also known as the Antigua Casa Alcaldía de Carolina (Old City Hall of Carolina), is a historic building in Carolina, Puerto Rico. The building was designed by Puerto Rican architect Rafael Carmoega, then an architect of the Department of the Interior, with assistance of Francisco Garden. The Department of the Interior also built the building. In addition to serving as the City Hall, the facilities included government offices, the Municipal Jail, and a Medical Office.

It is a reinforced concrete and steel building, with bearing walls and major beams made of reinforced concrete. Joists for floors are steel. The building has a belltower with a small, reinforced concrete cupola with Spanish ceramic tiles.

It was listed on the National Register of Historic Places in 1983 and on the Puerto Rico Register of Historic Sites and Zones in 2000. It was listed in part for its architecture, which is "in a style peculiar to the period in Puerto Rico. Reminiscent of traditional Spanish architecture, with motifs as varied as hanging moorish balconies on the one hand, and an austere Navarran portal on the other, the building is architecturally, one of the best in downtown Carolina."

The building was restored in 1992. It is currently the headquarters of the Cultural Development Program and the Tourism Office of the Municipality of Carolina. A new city hall was inaugurated in 1998.
