= Ayuntamiento de Adjuntas =

- U.S. National Register of Historic Places
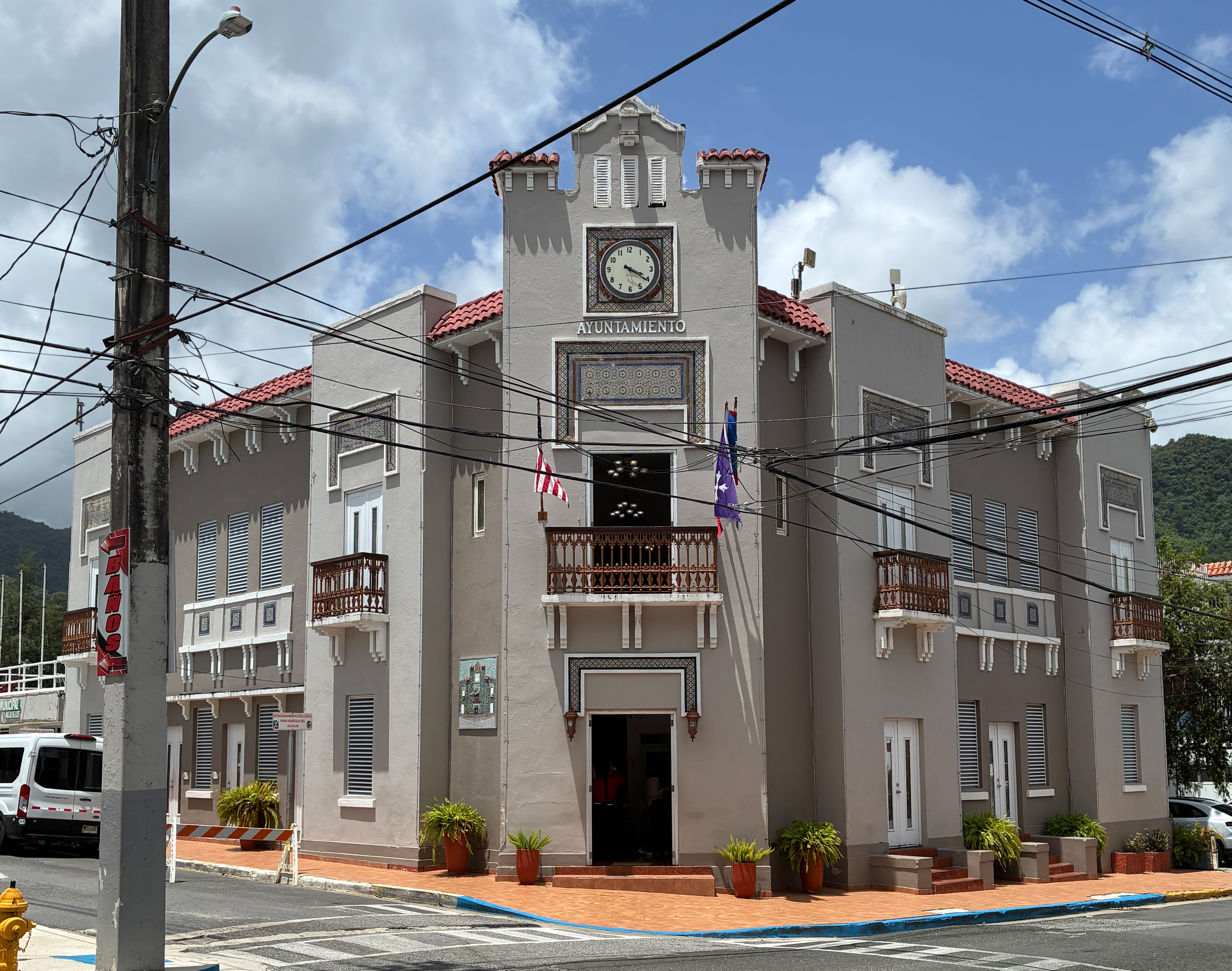
- Former city hall of Adjuntas in 2026

- Location within Puerto Rico
- Location: Rius Rivera and San Joaquin streets corner, Plaza Poeta Arístides Moll Boscana of Adjuntas, Puerto Rico
- Coordinates: 18°09′43″N 66°43′24″W
- Built: 1923
- Architect: Rafael Carmoega
- Architectural style: Spanish Colonial/Mission Revival
- NRHP reference No.: 100011645
- Added to NRHP: April 7, 2025

The Adjuntas City Hall (Spanish: Ayuntamiento de Adjuntas) is a historic civic building that serves as the municipal government headquarters of Adjuntas, Puerto Rico. The city hall, located in the southwestern corner of the main town square (plaza) of Adjuntas Pueblo, was built during the 1920s on the same location of the original town hall which had burned down earlier that same decade. The new city hall was designed by famed Puerto Rican architect Rafael Carmoega and it was inaugurated in 1923. The city hall is distinctive for its Spanish Colonial/Mission Revival style of architecture and it was added to the United States National Register of Historic Places in 2025.
