= Edificio del Valle =

- U.S. National Register of Historic Places
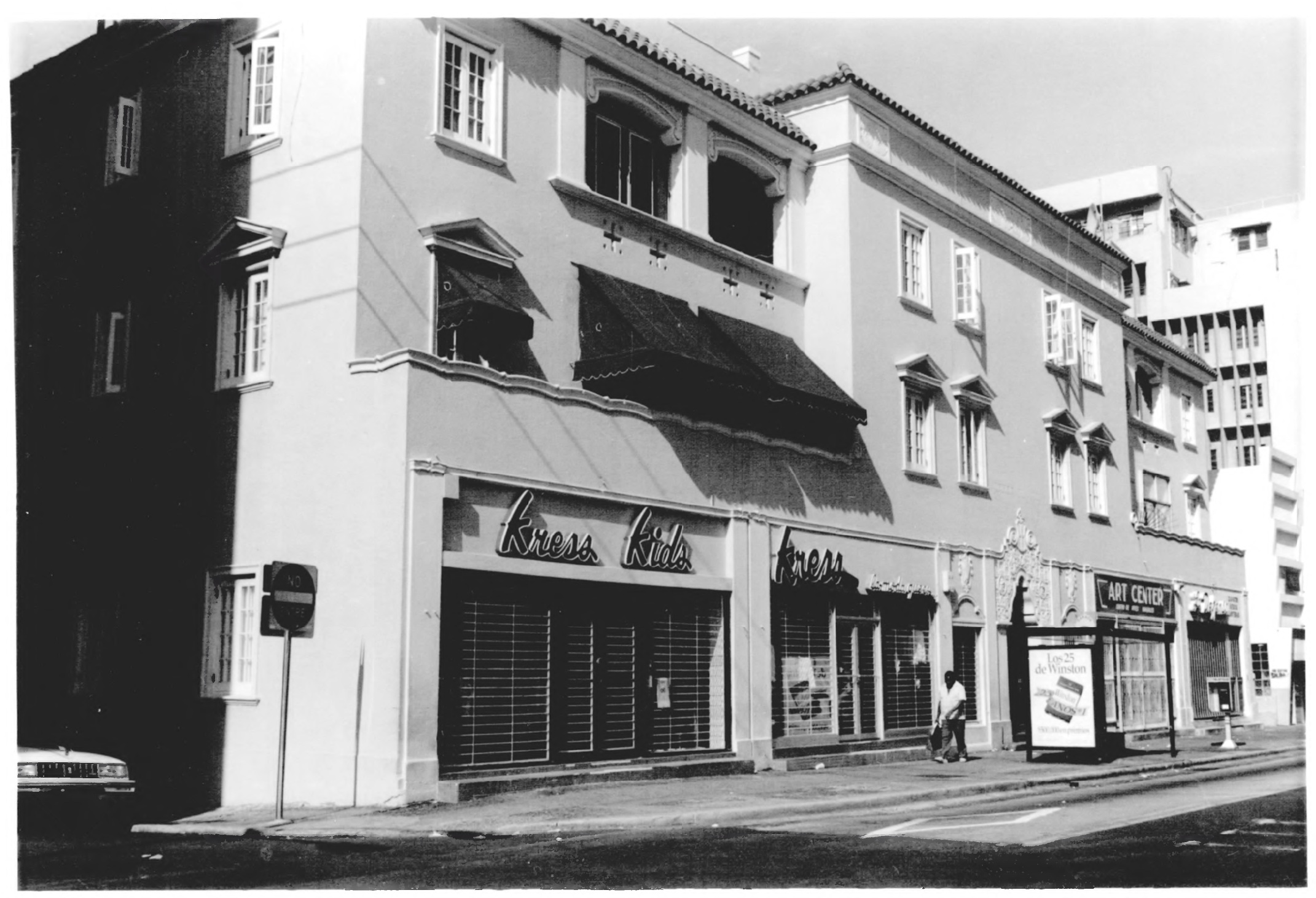
- Edificio del Valle in 1992.

- Location within Puerto Rico
- Location: 1118 Ponce de León Ave. San Juan, Puerto Rico
- Coordinates: 18°27′05″N 66°04′32″W
- Built: 1941
- Architect: Rafael Carmoega
- Architectural style: Mission/Spanish Revival
- NRHP reference No.: 04001243
- Added to NRHP: November 20, 2004

Edificio del Valle is a historic mixed-use building located at 1118 Ponce de León Avenue of Santurce in San Juan, Puerto Rico. It was built in 1941 by the Santurce Development Company and designed by famed Puerto Rican architect Rafael Carmoega, who also designed famous buildings such as the Capitol of Puerto Rico and the University of Puerto Rico clock tower among others. It is a five-story reinforced concrete structure with commercial and retail spaces on its ground level and 16 apartments in the rest. Edificio del Valle has a distinctive Spanish/Mission Revival-style, evident in many of Carmoega's works, with eclectic elements that reference both the local vernacular, Neoclassical and the Modernist styles of the period.

== See also ==
- Architecture of Puerto Rico
