= Mercado de las Carnes =

Historic place located in Ponce, Puerto Rico

Plaza Juan Ponce de León
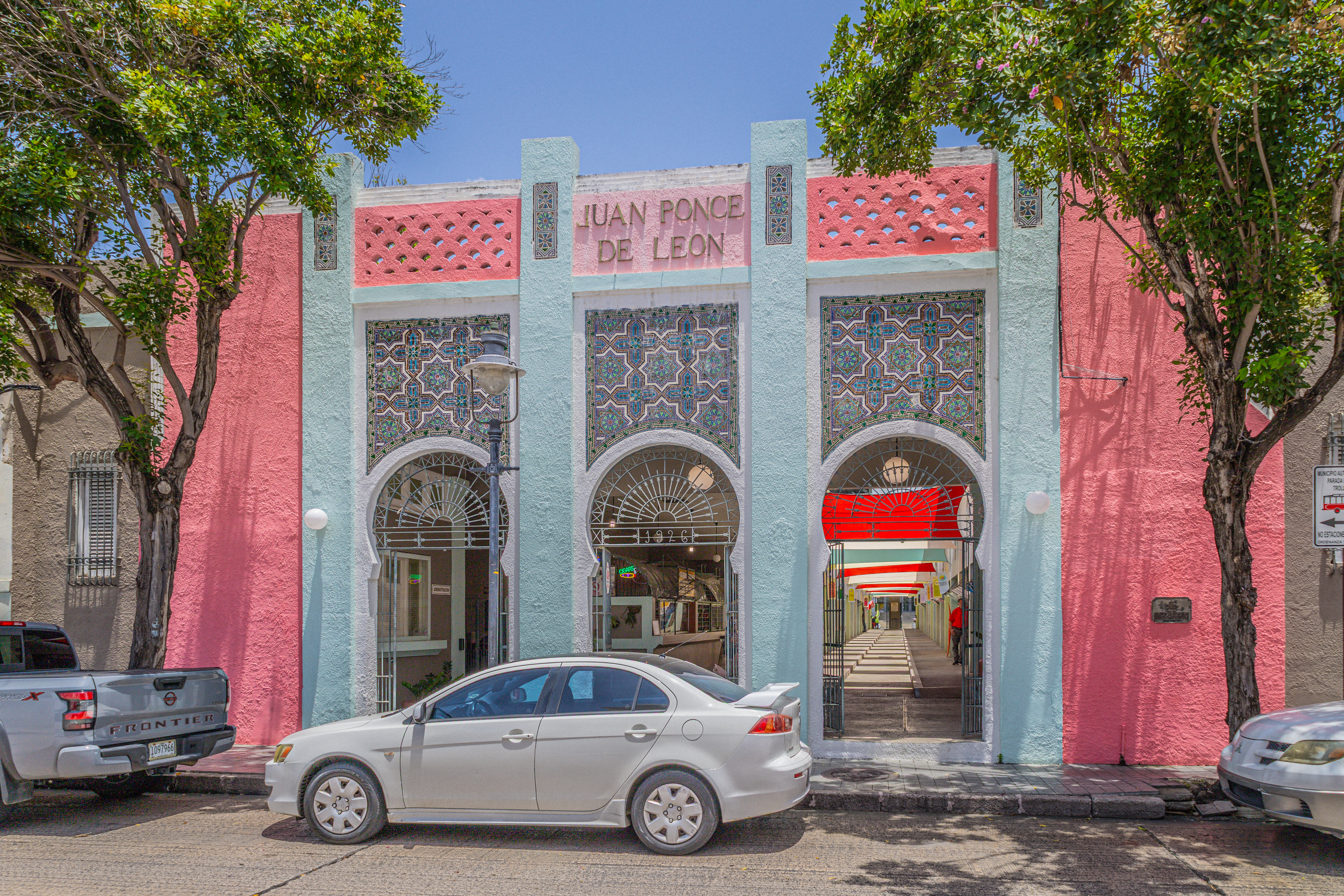
- Interactive map of the Plaza Juan Ponce de León area
- Former names: Mercado de las carnes
- Alternative names: Plaza de los perros

General information
- Status: Open
- Type: Colonial
- Architectural style: Art Deco, Neo-mudejar
- Location: C. Leon and C. Mayor, between C. Estrella and C. Guadalupe, 40 Calle León, Barrio Quinto, Ponce, Puerto Rico
- Coordinates: 18.015477°N 66.612878°W
- Current tenants: Artisans
- Named for: Juan Ponce de León
- Opened: 1926
- Client: Shopkeepers
- Owner: Ponce Municipal Government

Technical details
- Floor count: 1
- Floor area: 942 square metres (10,140 sq ft)

Design and construction
- Architect: Rafael Carmoega
- Designations: U.S. National Register of Historic Places
- Known for: First pedestrian mall in Puerto Rico

Other information
- Number of rooms: 33 shops
- Parking: Ponce Servicios

- Mercado de las Carnes
- U.S. National Register of Historic Places
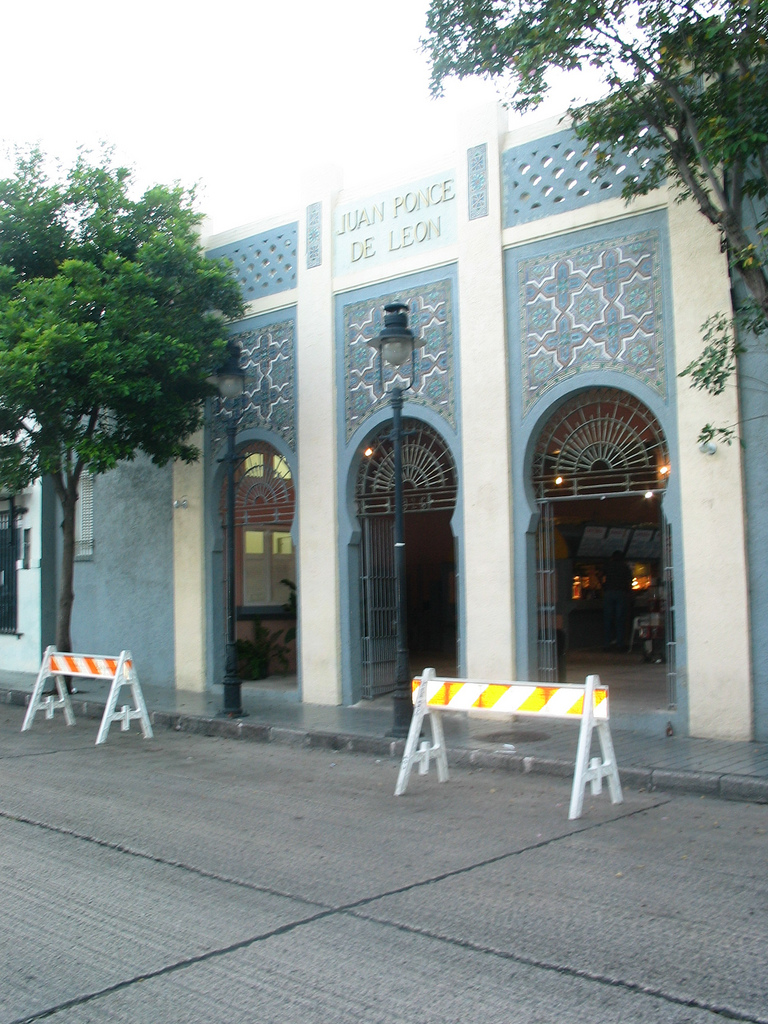
- Main entrance to Ponce's Historic Meat Market

- Location within Puerto Rico
- Location: Alley connecting Mayor and Leon Streets, Ponce, Puerto Rico
- Coordinates: 18°00′56″N 66°36′46″W
- Area: 942 square metres (10,140 sq ft)
- Built: 1926
- Architect: Rafael Carmoega
- Architectural style: Art Deco, Neo-mudejar
- NRHP reference No.: 86003199
- Added to NRHP: 17 November 1986

Mercado de las Carnes (English: Meat Market), also known as La Plaza de los Perros (English: Dogs' Plaza), but formally, Plaza Juan Ponce de León (Juan Ponce de León Plaza), was the first building in Puerto Rico to mix social and architectural elements via the pedestrian mall concept. The historic Art Deco architecture structure is located in Ponce, Puerto Rico, and dates from 1926. It was listed on the National Register of Historic Places in 1986. The Plaza was rebuilt in 1992, under the administration of Mayor Churumba. It is located in the alley connecting Mayor and Leon streets, in the block between Estrella and Guadalupe streets. The Plaza and the alley are one and the same.

== History ==
Ponce's Plaza de los Perros (English: Plaza of the Dogs), receives its name from the packs of stray dogs that gathered there to feed on the discarded meat scraps. A product of the rapid urban growth experienced in the city during the early 20th century, the Plaza was built in 1926 to relieve the overcrowded farmer's market ("Plaza del Mercado") and provide an adequate market place for perishable meat products.

== Significance ==
Located across the street from the historic Plaza del Mercado (Farmer's Market) the Plaza de los Perros serves as an urbanistic and commercial complement to the market place. Occupying a long, narrow lot, previously belonging to two back-to-back structures, the meat market connects two of Ponce's busiest commercial streets, Mayor and Leon, providing mid-block circulation to the main market by means of the pedestrian mall concept so popular today. Of significance is the adaptation of such innovative concepts to traditional social and architectural elements (the farmers' market and Moorish detailing), representing the contemporary modernistic trends in architecture. The double-function of such a traditional space was an innovation in Ponce and in Puerto Rico as a whole.

Of great importance is that the building's design bears the signature of Rafael Carmoega, one of the most established Puerto Rican architects of the 20th century. A graduate of the Cornell University School of Architecture and subsequent director of the Architectural division of Puerto Rico's Department of the Interior, Carmoega also designed the Capitol Building, the University of Puerto Rico Main Campus at Rio Piedras, the School of Tropical Medicine, and the Mayaguez City Hall, all listed on the National Register, in addition to other significant buildings. In his interest to preserve Hispanic traditions in the wake of the recent change of sovereignty from Spain to the United States, Carmoega utilized the Spanish Baroque and Neo-Mudejar vocabularies in his designs, emphasizing the use of glazed, mosaic tiles in many buildings. The Plaza de los Perros is a fine example of this latter style, incorporating glazed mosaics, horseshoe arches, and galleries in a mosque-like space for commercial usage.

== Physical appearance ==
=== Overall ===
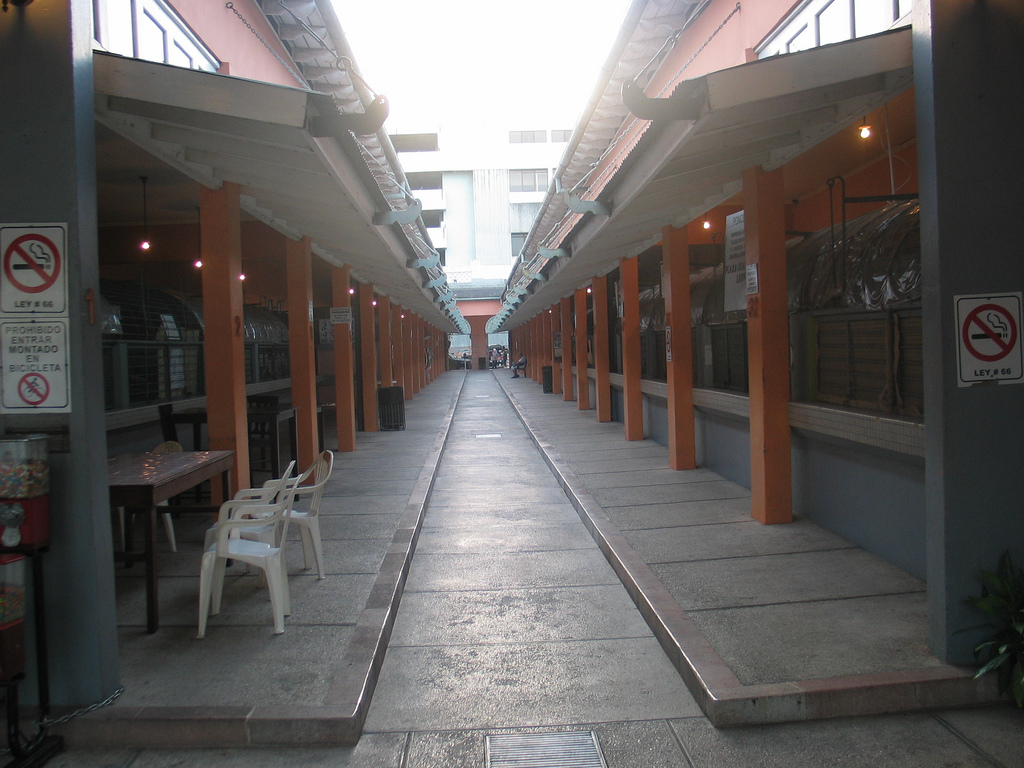
Interior of the Plaza Juan Ponce de León (a.k.a., "Plaza de los Perros") meat market in Ponce, Puerto Rico

The old "Mercado de las Carnes", or Meat Market, occupies a narrow through-lot connecting Mayor and Leon streets at the center of the block between Estrella and Guadalupe streets. In plan, the concrete, wood, and sheet-metal structure consists of an elongated quadrangle created by galleries opening onto an attenuated interior court. The neo-mudejar and Art Deco decorative facades appear to be independent of the actual utilitarian structure inside, as they shift slightly in opposite direction off the central court axis to accommodate the mall.

=== Façade ===
The east and west facades are identical, each consisting of a rectangular mass of approximately 20 feet (6.1 m) in height and 30 in width, which defines the major façade element. This rectangle is divided into five ground-storey bays: a series of three central bays flanked by slightly narrower wall areas. The bays are defined by a series of four vertical buttress-like piers which extend slightly above the ridge of the building.

=== Entryways ===
The three central bays form the frontispiece of the facade, each of similar dimensions and created as an access to the interior court. Each bay contains a horseshoe arch approximately one-half the height of the facade and almost the full width of the bay. Above each arch, a decorative spandrel panel contains glazed mosaic tiles in intricate Moorish patterns. Within each bay, a horizontal band stretching between the concrete piers separates the spandrel area from the parapet above. The parapet is completely solid above the central bay, whereas the parapets of the flanking bays are articulated with open, semi-circular concrete forms. At this level, the concrete piers are decorated with vertical rectangular panels of glazed multi-colored mosaic tiles.

The bays flanking the frontispiece are solid and without articulation, although the southern bay has been punctured at ground level by wide, wooden doors as access to a street-side refreshments stand. A concrete cantilever shades the entrance and a vertical sign above announces the name of each business.

=== Interior ===
At the interior court, a series of simplified, square, Tuscan columns creates a gallery enclosing individual market areas within each bay. The stoa-like galleries are sheltered by a wood and sheet-metal roof pitched inward toward the court. Additional continuous wood and sheet-metal eaves, stemming from the colonnade and suspended by link-chains from the architrave provide shelter within the court for those doing their shopping.

=== Alterations ===
This property has remained basically unaltered all elements described contribute to the structure's value. The only alteration is the refreshments stands' sign and the covering of the upper part of the stand's arch which are non-contributing elements.

== Effect of 2020 Puerto Rico earthquakes ==
The roof of the structure was damaged due to the 2020 Puerto Rico earthquakes and Plaza Juan Ponce de León had to be closed for repairs. As a result, vendors had to vacate their shops and remove their merchandise. Provisional repairs were announced to take approximately two weeks, after which merchants could then move back in. Municipal government plans were to prepare plans for a more permanent restoration of the roof at a later date.

== See also ==
- Plaza de Mercado de Ponce
- La Gran Enciclopedia de Puerto Rico, Vol XIX, "Arquitectura y Leyes", Editorial Rumbo, Madrid. 1976.
- Acevedo Cruz, Joaquin. Conservacion: Area de la Plaza del Mercado de Ponce. Escuela de Arquitectura U.P.R., 1982 (unpublished).
