= Walter McK. Jones School =

- U.S. National Register of Historic Places
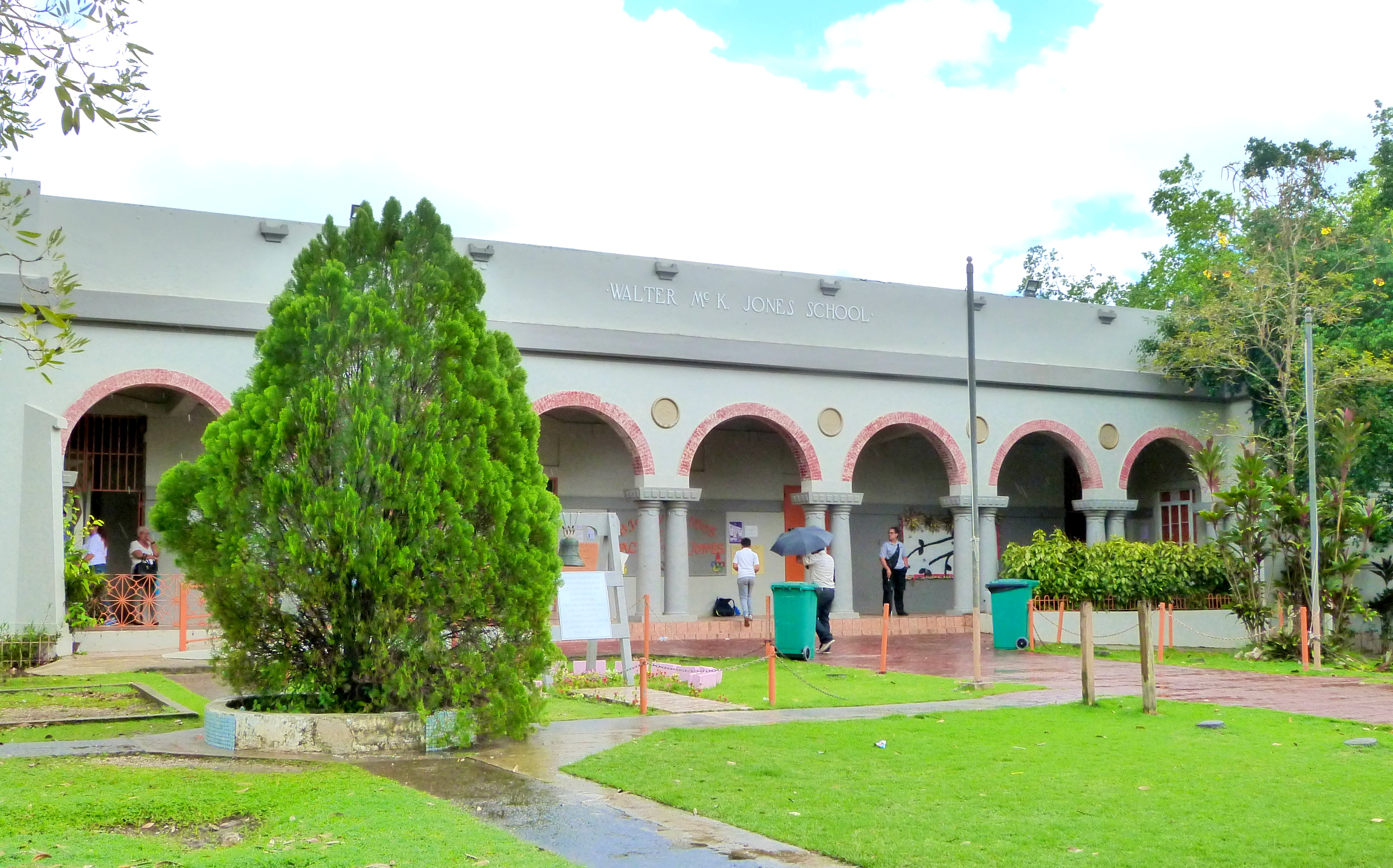
- The school exterior in 2017.

- Location within Puerto Rico
- Location: 28 Luis Muñoz Rivera Street, Villalba Pueblo, Villalba, Puerto Rico
- Coordinates: 18°7′47″N 66°29′31″W
- Built: 1926
- Architect: Rafael Carmoega
- Architectural style: Mission/Spanish Revival
- MPS: Early Twentieth Century Schools in Puerto Rico TR
- NRHP reference No.: 12001249
- Added to NRHP: January 29, 2013

Walter McK. Jones School (Spanish: Escuela Walter McK. Jones) is a historic school building located in Villalba Pueblo, the administrative and historic center of the municipality of Villalba, Puerto Rico. The school was designed by famed Puerto Rican architect Rafael Carmoega and built in 1926, with additional modifications finished in 1947. The school is a prime example of the early 20th century school architecture in Puerto Rico, and it was added to the National Register of Historic Places on January 29, 2013.

== See also ==
- National Register of Historic Places listings in central Puerto Rico
