= Rafael Carmoega =

Puerto Rican architect

Rafael Carmoega Morales
- Born: 1894; Rio Piedras, Puerto Rico
- Died: 1968 (aged 73–74); Santurce, Puerto Rico
- Occupation: Architect

Rafael Carmoega Morales (1894–1968) was a Puerto Rican architect from Rio Piedras, Puerto Rico. He was the first Puerto Rican to become State Architect, a position within the Department of the Interior which he held from 1921 to 1936. Carmoega was one of the most accomplished Puerto Rican architects of the 20th century.

== Early years ==
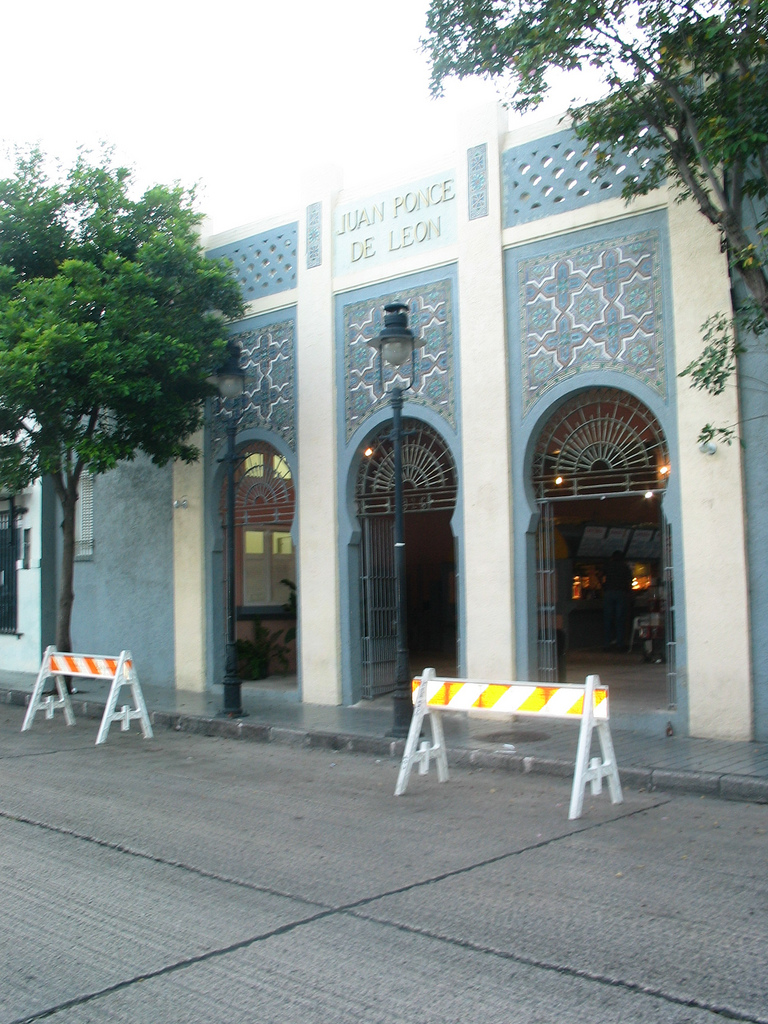
The Ponce Meat Market, designed by Carmoega

Rafael Carmoega Morales was born in Ponce in 1894.

== Training ==
A 1918 graduate of the Cornell University School of Architecture and subsequent director of the Architectural division of Puerto Rico's Department of the Interior.

== Career ==
He was the first Puerto Rican to become State Architect, a position within the Department of the Interior which he held from 1921 to 1936. In 1936 he went to work for the Puerto Rico Reconstruction Administration (PRRA) where he designed the University of Puerto Rico based on the Parsons Plan of 1924. In 1937 he established a private practice, which was characterized by eclecticism, and a varied mix of architectural styles. As a private architect he produced the designs for the residences of Secundino Lozana (El Cortijo) in Barranquitas barrio-pueblo and Dionisio Trigo in Santurce, the General Electric store in San Juan, Colegio San José in Río Piedras and the Casino de Puerto Rico in El Condado.

== Works ==
In his interest to preserve Hispanic traditions in the wake of the recent change of sovereignty of Puerto Rico from Spain to the United States, Carmoega utilized the Spanish Baroque and Neo-Mudejar vocabularies in his designs, emphasizing the use of glazed, mosaic tiles in many buildings. The Plaza de los Perros in Ponce is a fine example of this latter style, incorporating glazed mosaics, horseshoe arches, and galleries in a mosque-like space for commercial usage.

=== Buildings ===
- Adjuntas City Hall, Adjunas (1927)
- Aguadilla District Courthouse, Aguadilla (1925)
- Antonia Sáez School, Humacao (1922)
- Capitol of Puerto Rico, San Juan (1929)
- Casino de Puerto Rico, San Juan (1945, demolished)
- Daniel Webster School, Peñuelas (1934)
- del Valle Building, San Juan (1941)
- El Cortijo, Barranquitas (1939)
- General Electric Store, San Juan (1937, demolished)
- Humacao District Courthouse, Humacao (1925)
- José Fontán School, Morovis (1928)
- Manatí Market Hall, Manatí (1925)
- Mercado de las Carnes, Ponce (1926)
- Old City Hall of Carolina, Carolina (1930)
- Pueblo del Niño, Dorado (1940, abandoned)
- School of Tropical Medicine, San Juan (1926)
- United States Custom House, Mayagüez (1924)
- University of Puerto Rico Main Campus at Rio Piedras, San Juan (1924, 1935)
  - The Quadrangle
  - Roosevelt Tower
- Walter McK. Jones School, Villalba (1926)

== Death ==
Carmoega died in San Juan in 1968.

== Papers ==
The Architecture and Construction Archives at the University of Puerto Rico (AACUPR) holds the Rafael Carmoega collection (1837–1969). Approximately 48 cubic feet in size, the collection contains architectural drawings, photographs, artifacts, textual documents, and publications. The Architectural Drawing Series holds 144 projects organized chronologically. The collection was donated by Mrs. Carmoega, widow of Ramírez, Ms. Margarita Higuera and architect Antonio Higuera in 1989.

== See also ==
- Blas Silva
- Francisco Porrata Doria
- Wiechers-Villaronga Residence
- List of Puerto Ricans
