= Examples of civil disobedience =

Towards civil disobedience

The following are examples of civil disobedience.

== Bahamas ==
In 2023, the leader of the environmental organization Bahamian Evolution called for civil disobedience as they protested against the government.

== Cuba ==
The movement Yo No Coopero Con La Dictadura ("I Do Not Cooperate with the Dictatorship"), commonly called Yo No ("Not I" or "I don't") for short, is a civil disobedience campaign against the government in Cuba. The campaign utilizes the slogan "I do want change", and is articulated in six fundamental points: "I do not repudiate, I do not assist, I do not snitch, I do not follow, I do not cooperate, and I do not repress." Furthermore, as a symbolic gesture of non-cooperation with the Cuban regime, members of the organization cross their arms over their chests.

Multiple artists, such as Lissette Álvarez, Amaury Gutiérrez, Willy Chirino, Jon Secada, Paquito D'Rivera and Boncó Quiñongo, have declared their support for the movement.

Ladies in White is a group of wives, mothers, and sisters of imprisoned Cuban dissidents, who have engaged in peaceful civil disobedience in order to seek the release of their relatives, whom they allege are political prisoners. Ladies in White jointly won the European Union's Sakharov Prize for Freedom of Thought.

== Estonian Soviet Socialist Republic ==
The Singing Revolution lasted over four years, with various protests and acts of defiance. In 1991, as Soviet tanks attempted to stop the progress towards independence, the Supreme Council of Estonia together with the Congress of Estonia proclaimed the restoration of the independent state of Estonia and repudiated Soviet legislation. People acted as human shields to protect radio and TV stations from the Soviet tanks. Through these actions Estonia regained its independence without any bloodshed.

== Egypt ==
Among the several civil disobedience that took place along the history of modern Egypt (most of which aren't widely known), the Egyptian Revolution of 1919 is considered to be one of the earliest successful implementations of non-violent civil disobedience world-wide. It was a countrywide revolution against the British occupation of Egypt and Sudan. It was started by Egyptians and Sudanese from different walks of life as a wake against the British-ordered exile of revolutionary leader Saad Zaghlul and other members of the Wafd Party in 1919.

The 1919 revolution in Egypt continued for months as civil disobedience against the British occupation and strikes by students and lawyers, as well as postal, telegraph, tram and railway workers, and, eventually Egyptian government personnel. The event led to Britain's recognition of Egyptian independence in 1922, and the implementation of a new constitution in 1923.

== East Germany ==
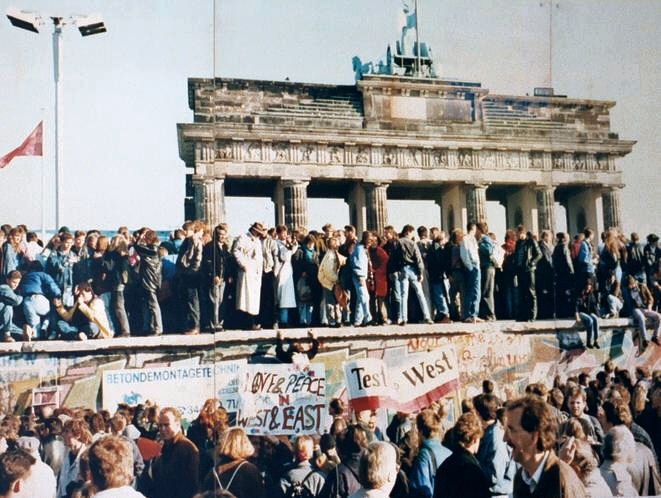
In 1989, East Germans used civil disobedience to break the Berlin Wall in order to unite a divided Germany.

The Uprising of 1953 was disobedience against the government in East Germany. The protests were put down by the state.

Civil resistance was a significant factor behind the dissolution of communist governments and the fall of the Berlin Wall in 1989.

== France ==
In 1972, 103 peasant landowners took an oath to resist the proposed extension of the existing military training base on the Larzac plateau. Lanza del Vasto, a disciple of Gandhi, advised them on civil disobedience tactics, including hunger strikes, that were ultimately successful. The base extension was cancelled by President François Mitterrand immediately after his election in 1984

== India ==
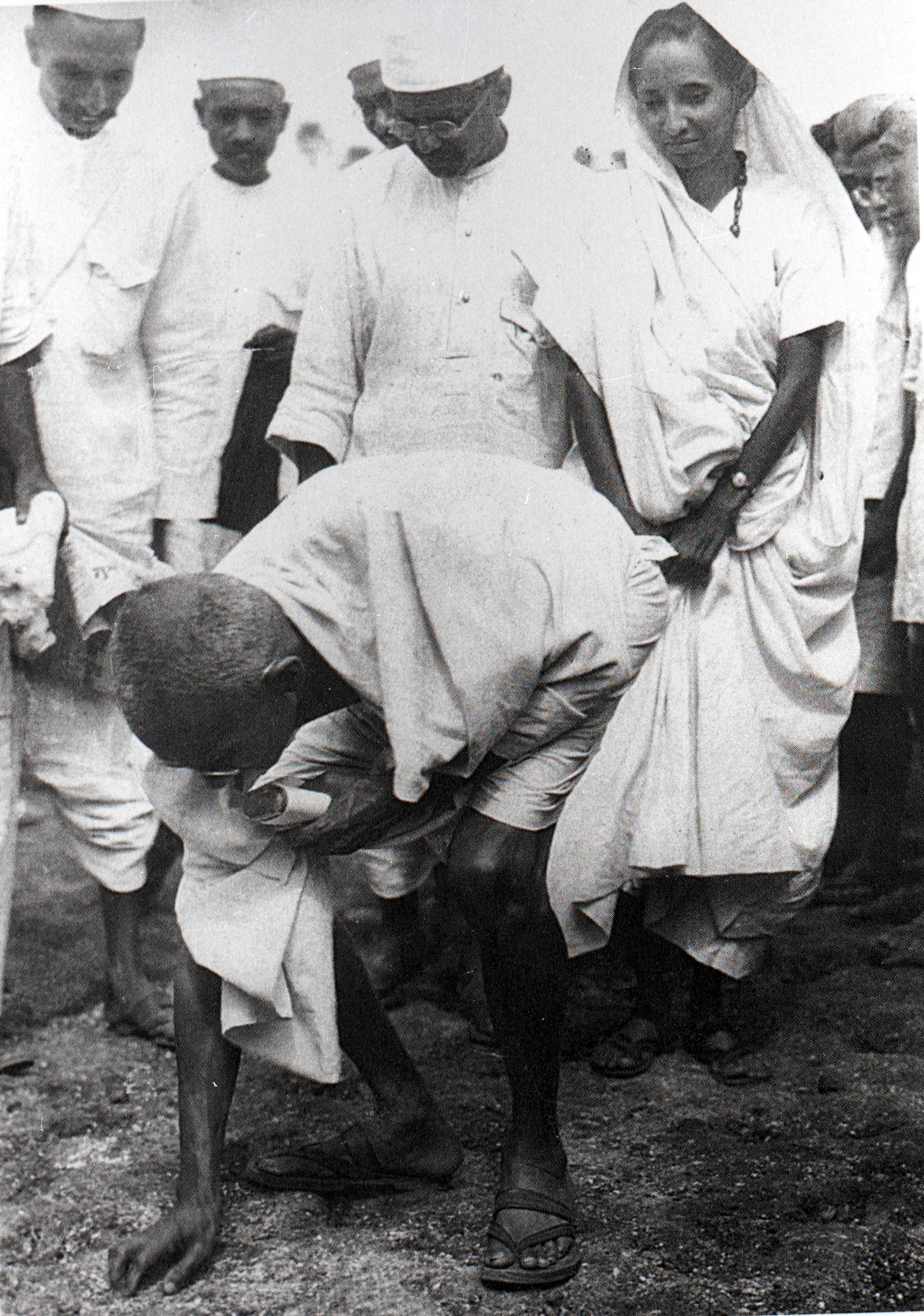
Mahatma Gandhi at Dandi beach, picking salt to break Salt laws, at the end of the Salt March, 5 April 1930.

Civil disobedience has served as a major tactic of nationalist movements in former colonies in Africa and Asia prior to their gaining independence. Most notably, Mahatma Gandhi developed civil disobedience as an anti-colonialist tool. Gandhi stated, "Civil disobedience is the inherent right of a citizen to be civil, implies discipline, thought, care, attention and sacrifice". Though some biographers opine that Gandhi learned of civil disobedience from Thoreau's classic essay, which he incorporated into his non-violent Satyagraha philosophy, Gandhi in Hind Swaraj observes that "In India the nation at large has generally used passive resistance in all departments of life. We cease to cooperate with our rulers when they displease us." Gandhi's work in South Africa and in the Indian independence movement was the first successful application of civil disobedience on a large scale.

== Israel ==
Following the Oslo Accords in the early 1990s, Moshe Feiglin and Shmuel Sackett founded Zo Artzeinu (Hebrew: זו ארצנו, This is our land), a political protest movement created to block Israeli land concessions to the Arabs, and prevent recognition of the State of Palestine by the government. The movement was known to block roads and use other forms of civil disobedience. The leaders were arrested and sentenced to prison sentences for sedition, but the sentences were later commuted to community service instead.

== Japan ==
- Anpo protests in 1960

== Republic of Korea ==
- March 1st Movement against Japanese rule
- 15 March movement against First Republic of South Korea in 1960
- April revolution
- Bu-Ma Democratic Protests
- Gwangju Uprising
- June Revolution

== Lithuanian Soviet Socialist Republic ==
Sajudis used civil disobedience in the Lithuanian Soviet Socialist Republic to seek independence from the Soviet Union.

== Myanmar ==
In response to 2021 Myanmar military coup, frontline medical workers country-wide have started a civil disobedience movement. 70 hospitals and medical departments have stopped work in protest of government formed after the coup. In addition, the citizens have used nationwide coordinated symbolic protest of 8pm-nightly clanging of pots and cymbals—alluding to the tradition of making noise to expel evil spirits.

== Pakistan ==
In 2007-2008, lawyers in Pakistan led a nationwide movement of street protests and civil disobedience against the rule of President Pervez Musharraf, an army general. The Lawyers' Movement began in response to Musharraf's attempt to dismiss the chief justice of Pakistan's Supreme Court, Iftikhar Muhammad Chaudhry, after Chaudhry issued rulings holding Pakistan's military and intelligence agencies responsible for the unexplained disappearance of hundreds of Pakistani citizens. The lawyers won support of political parties and civil society groups opposed to a continuation of army rule. Police attacked protest marches with batons, arrested lawyers and human rights leaders organizing the movement, and raided the Lahore High Court Bar Association, one of the organizing centers of the civil disobedience campaign. Musharraf lost public support and Pakistan's main political parties agreed in summer 2008 to impeach him. Musharraf resigned in August and a quickly organized presidential election yielded Asif Ali Zardari, the husband of the assassinated former prime minister, Benazir Bhutto, as Musharraf's successor. Zardari hesitated to reinstall the independent-minded Chaudhry as chief justice and protests, including civil disobedience, continued until Zardari did so in March 2009.

On 17 August 2014, Cricketer-turned-politician Imran Khan called for widespread civil disobedience in Pakistan, urging supporters to stop paying taxes and utility bills in a bid to oust the government of Prime Minister Nawaz Sharif. Pakistani opposition politician Imran Khan has called for a campaign of civil disobedience as he addressed thousands of supporters protesting for a second day against the government of Nawaz Sharif in Islamabad.

The FPCCI(Federation of the Pakistan Chambers of Commerce and Industry) chief said political activities should not affect economic and trade activities. Strikes, harassment through mobs and destruction of the public and private properties are the national loss.

Zakaria Usman said that political crises needed dialogue and all political parties should come forward for this noble cause.

Quetta Chamber of Commerce and Industry (QCCI) President Mohammad Asim Siddiqi said that the PTI has not unveiled any future plans as to how the country will run if nobody will pay taxes, duties and utility bills.

The PTI chief must disclose as to how the country would pay its foreign debt and achieve economic stability, he said. Vice President of Lahore Chamber of Commerce and Industry (LCCI) Kashif Anwar said: "We made old Pakistan in 1947, new Pakistan in 1971 but cannot afford another new Pakistan at a time when the country and the business environment are already passing through various challenges." "Everybody has to pay taxes and duties to foster economic activities", he said.

"Imran should focus on Khyber Pakhtunkhwa and emerge as a role model by taking the province to the peak of economic and political stability", Kashif said, adding "if Nawaz Sharif fails to live up to the expectations of the people, the people would cast vote in favour of Khan Saheb in the next election for a better performance in KP."

Rawalpindi Chamber of Commerce and Industry (RCCI) President Dr Shimail Daud Arain said he had contacted all chambers, including Karachi Chamber, who have unanimously rejected the PTI chief's call. Site Association of Trade and Industry Chairman Younus Bashir said the businessmen would condemn PTI call which would only create cracks in country's economic and political stability. In Short the call for civil disobedience was rejected by the nation.

=== East Pakistan (Bangladesh) ===
During his famous speech on 7 March 1971, East Pakistan's Bengali nationalist leader Sheikh Mujibur Rahman and his Awami League party with the support of the Indian state announced the historic "non-cooperation" movement against the military and political establishment of West Pakistan in an effort to press the Pakistani government to accept the national election results of 1970 in which the Awami League won. The movement saw the complete shut down of all government and semi government offices, public transport, businesses, schools, and colleges. East Pakistanis stopped paying taxes to the Pakistani state, and all monetary transactions between East and West Pakistan came to a complete halt. All forms of communications in the form of telephone and telegraph with West Pakistan were also suspended. The Awami League leadership became the de facto government of East Pakistan for 18 days, and this shook the very core of the Pakistani state. The movement came to an end with the launch of the bloody Operation Searchlight by the Pakistan Army on 26 March 1971.

== Puerto Rico ==
At least four major acts of civil disobedience have taken place in Puerto Rico. These have not been directed at the local government of the Commonwealth, but against the Federal Government of the United States.

The first case, known as the Navy-Culebra protests, consisted of a series of protests starting in 1971 on the island of Culebra, Puerto Rico, against the United States Navy's use of the island. The historical backdrop started in 1902, three years after the U.S. invasion of Puerto Rico, when Culebra was integrated as a part of Vieques. But on 26 June 1903, US President Theodore Roosevelt established the Culebra Naval Reservation in Culebra, and in 1939, the U.S. Navy began to use the Culebra Archipelago as a gunnery and bombing practice site. In 1971 the people of Culebra began the protests for the removal of the U.S. Navy from Culebra. The protests were led by Ruben Berrios, president of the Puerto Rican Independence Party (PIP), a well-regarded attorney in international rights, president-honorary of the Socialist International, and law professor at the University of Puerto Rico. Berrios and other protesters squatted in Culebra for a few days. Some of them, including Berrios, were arrested and imprisoned for "civil disobedience". The official charge was trespassing U.S. military territory. The protests led to the U.S. Navy discontinuing the use of Culebra as a gunnery range in 1975 and all of its operations were moved to Vieques.

The second case, is, in a sense, an aftermath of the first case.

The continuing post-war presence in Vieques of the United States Navy drew protests from the local community, angry at the expropriation of their land and the environmental impact of weapons testing. These protests came to a head in 1999 when Vieques native David Sanes was killed by a bomb dropped during target practice. A campaign of civil disobedience began. The locals took to the ocean in their small fishing boats and successfully stopped the US Navy's military exercises. The Vieques issue became something of a cause celèbre, and local protesters were joined by others from mainland Puerto Rico (such as Tito Kayak) and many other sympathetic groups as well as a significant number of prominent individuals from the mainland United States (such as American actor Edward James Olmos) and abroad. The matter had attained international notoriety. Many celebrities, including the political leader Ruben Berrios, singer Ricky Martin, boxer Félix 'Tito' Trinidad, and Guatemala's Nobel Prize winner Rigoberta Menchú participated, as did Robert F. Kennedy, Jr., Al Sharpton, the Rev. Jesse Jackson, and even some members of the US Congress. Berrios, Olmos, Sharpton and Kennedy, were among those who served jail time. As a result of this pressure, in May 2003 the Navy withdrew from Vieques, and much of the island was designated a National Wildlife Refuge under the control of the United States Fish and Wildlife Service. Closure of nearby Roosevelt Roads Naval Station on the Puerto Rico mainland followed in 2004.

== Russia ==
In Imperial Russia during the summer of 1895, over 7,000 Spiritual Christian (non-Orthodox) Doukhobors destroyed their weapons of war (hand guns, rifles and knives) in three large bonfires in the South Caucasus. The protesters were about one-third of all Doukhobors in Russia, most followers of Peter V. Verigin's "Large Party". Many participants in the three mass protests were physically beaten and arrested by government Cossack soldiers who then occupied many Doukhobor Large Party villages. About 4,000 protesters were exiled, scattered to non-Doukhobor villages in Tiflis Governorate (now in the Republic of Georgia), where many died of starvation and exposure. News of punishment of thousands of Russian Doukhobor peace protesters appalled Count Lev N. Tolstoy who lobbied for their humane treatment and release, or allow them to emigrate to a free country. The Society of Friends (Quakers), London, offered to organize a migration, and Tolstoy rushed his last novel (Resurrection) to press as a series, donating half his earnings (the other half built a school for Doukhobors who stayed) and donations from his friends to the cause (about one-fifth of the initial travel cost). In 1898-1899, about 7,500 (one-third) migrated on four ships to Saskatchewan, Canada. In 1900-1901, Tolstoy twice petitioned the Tsar for humane treatment of peasants, and news was translated in the international press. From 1899 to 1930, about 8,400 Doukhobors (one-third), most followers of Verigin, migrated to Central Canada on 79 ships. The Doukhobor migration motivated thousands of neighboring Spiritual Christian tribes to also migrate to North America.

== South Africa ==
This famous movement, started by Nelson Mandela along with Archbishop Desmond Tutu and Steve Biko, advocated civil disobedience. The result can be seen in such notable events as the 1989 Purple Rain Protest, and the Cape Town Peace March which defied apartheid.

== Sudan ==
Starting November 2016 as the President Omar al-Bashir has raised fuel prices across the country to curb inflation. Medicine and electricity costs have been on the rise for the past few years and people say they are fed up. Many have launched a civil disobedience campaign Instead of taking to the streets or marching towards a ministry or the presidential palace to express their concerns, as they have done in the past, Sudanese protesters are doing something much simpler. Activists stands in solidarity with the Sudanese people, who are demanding political change in their country. One of the main changes that for the Sudanese Government to step down and leave. As a response, the Sudanese authorities reportedly have seized copies of independent newspapers that are reporting on a three-day strike that took place on 27 November 2016.

== Thailand ==
Sondhi Limthongkul, leader of the People's Alliance for Democracy (PAD), and other leaders of this alliance have claimed to be using civil disobedience, such as postponing tax payments and starting strikes & because of this civilian protested.

== Ukraine ==
The Orange Revolution (Ukrainian: Помаранчева революція, romanized: Pomarancheva revolyutsiya) was a series of protests and political events that took place in Ukraine from late November 2004 to January 2005, in the immediate aftermath of the run-off vote of the 2004 Ukrainian presidential election which was marred by massive corruption, voter intimidation and direct electoral fraud. Kyiv, the Ukrainian capital, was the focal point of the movement with thousands of protesters demonstrating daily. Nationwide, the democratic revolution was highlighted by a series of acts of civil disobedience, sit-ins, and general strikes organized by the pro-Western opposition movement.

== United States ==
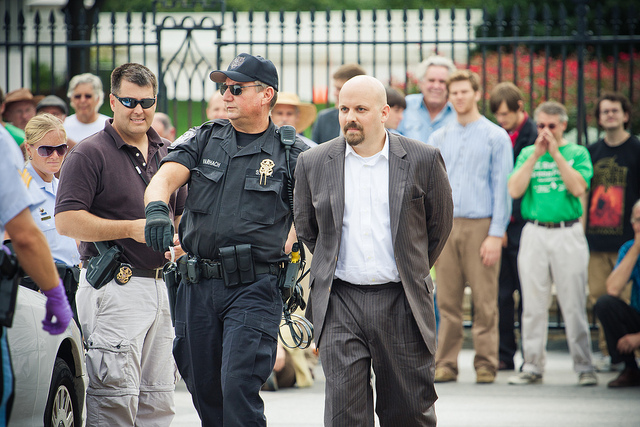
Phil Radford, of Greenpeace USA, arrested at Keystone XL Pipeline protest

The 16 December 1773, Boston Tea Party was one of the most famous acts of civil disobedience in American history.

Susan B. Anthony was arrested for illegally voting in the 1872 United States House of Representatives elections in order to protest female disenfranchisement.

It was arguably during the abolitionist movement that civil disobedience first defined itself. Henry Thoreau refused to pay federal taxes in protest of both slavery and the Mexican War; this action directly inspired the "Civil Disobedience" essay. Numerous more militant actions, such as the Christiana incident led by William Parker were taken in defiance of the Fugitive Slave Act. In spite of the violence of the actions, juries often refused to convict the defendants.

Martin Luther King Jr., James Bevel, Rosa Parks, and other activists in the American civil rights movement of the 1950s and 1960s, used nonviolent civil disobedience techniques. Among the most notable civil disobedience events in the U.S. occurred when Parks refused to move on the bus when a white man tried to take her seat. Although 15-year-old Claudette Colvin had done the same thing nine months earlier, Parks' action led directly to the Montgomery bus boycott. A more common act of civil disobedience (in opposition to Jim Crow laws) during the civil rights movement would be a "colored" person (i.e. an African American) sitting at a "whites only" lunch counter or bus terminal waiting room. In addition, other actions of the era, not all involving civil disobedience, include the Sit-in movements of 1958 and 1960, the 1961 Freedom Riders, the 1963 Birmingham campaign, the 1965 Selma to Montgomery marches and the 1966 Chicago Open Housing Movement. These nonviolent events were effective in promoting the eventual passage of the Civil Rights Act of 1964, the Voting Rights Act of 1965, and the Open Housing Act of 1968.

Anti-Vietnam War activism brought one of the largest waves of civil disobedience in US history. Approximately 34,000 young men burned their draft cards or turned them in to the government. Dozens of protesters, such as Daniel Berrigan and the Catonsville Nine, broke into draft boards, seized draft records, and destroyed them to dramatize their protest against the war. Other major manifestations were the Chicago 1968 protests, and the 1970 student strike. Disobedience spread to the armed forces. with some facing court marshall for openly refusing to fight. Tens of thousands deserted from the military, going to Canada or to Western Europe. By 1972, army disobedience was widespread, with 50 out of 142 GIs in one company refusing to go out on patrol.

In the wake of the Vietnam protests and civil rights movement, civil disobedience became a major part of other social movements of the era, such as the American Indian Movement, with the Alcatraz Island and Wounded Knee Occupation; and the gay liberation (LGBT) movement which was launched with the Stonewall riots.

Since the 1970s, anti-abortion groups have practiced civil disobedience against the U.S. government over the issue of legalized abortion. The broader American public has a long history of subverting unconstitutional governance, from the Whiskey Rebellion to the war on drugs. However, the extent to which simple violation of sumptuary laws represents true civil disobedience aimed at legal and/or social reform varies widely.

American interest in theoretical discussions of civil disobedience was also sparked by the Nuremberg trials, the security and loyalty controversies of the 1950s, and the pre-arms control years of nuclear power. The 2000s (decade) have seen some libertarian civil disobedience by Free State Project participants and others.

In 2010, Arizonans were planning to protest Arizona SB 1070 by not carrying their identification papers. Also that year, five protestors pleaded guilty to trespassing after they sat in the chairs of the Greensboro, North Carolina city council during a recess, banged the gavel, and denounced a subculture of police corruption.

In August and September 2011, 1253 demonstrators organized by environmentalist Bill McKibben were arrested for sitting on the sidewalk in front of the White House over the course of two weeks. The group, including environmentalists like Phil Radford, celebrities like Daryl Hannah, indigenous and religious leaders, students, and landowners faced arrest to express opposition to the proposed Keystone Pipeline extension (Keystone XL) permit which would bring oil sands from Alberta, Canada to refineries along the Gulf of Mexico. The White House was chosen as a site of action because of President Barack Obama's role in the decision.

On 15 April 2015 a pilot landed a one-man ultralight gyrocopter on the west lawn of the US Capitol Building in a protest against the influence of money in politics. The pilot, Doug Hughes, who was a mailman, carried 535 letters - one for every member of Congress. He was arrested after landing and sentenced to 120 days in prison.

== Vietnam ==
On 11 June 1963, Vietnamese Mahayana Buddhist Thích Quảng Đức burned himself alive on a busy intersection in protest of the persecution of Buddhists under the current government. After, several other Buddhists followed in Đức's footsteps and carried out similar actions. This form of disobedience drew attention to the current government in South Vietnam, and created much controversy and created pressure on the government and their policies.

== Religious examples ==
Many who practice civil disobedience do so out of religious faith, and there has been evidence that clergy often participate in or lead actions of civil disobedience. Notable examples include Dorothy Day, co-founder of the Catholic Worker Movement, Philip Berrigan, a one-time Catholic priest, and his brother Daniel Berrigan, a Jesuit priest, who were arrested dozens of times in acts of civil disobedience in antiwar protests. Also, groups like Soulforce, who favor non-discrimination and equal rights for gays and lesbians, have engaged in acts of civil disobedience to change church positions and public policy.

== Climate change ==
On 2 November 2008, Nobel Peace Prize winner and environmentalist Al Gore, speaking at the Clinton Global Initiative in New York City, urged young people on Wednesday to engage in civil disobedience to stop the construction of coal plants: "If you're a young person looking at the future of this planet and looking at what is being done right now, and not done, I believe we have reached the stage where it is time for civil disobedience to prevent the construction of new coal plants that do not have carbon capture and sequestration." Illegal protests against climate change occurred at the Chevron plant.

In December 2008, one of the most infamous acts of civil disobedience in modern times took place when Utah college student Tim DeChristopher bid on controversial land leases being auctioned off by the Bureau of Land Management. Much of the controversial auction was invalidated, however, and Tim was convicted of two felonies in March 2011 for his actions.

On 28 April 2009, Greenpeace activists, including Phil Radford, scaled a crane across the street from the Department of State, calling on world leaders to address climate change. Soon thereafter, Greenpeace activists dropped a banner off of Mount Rushmore, placing President Obama's face next to other historic presidents, which read "History Honors Leaders; Stop Global Warming".

In 2009, hundreds blocked the gates of the coal fired power plant that powers the US Congress building, following the Powershift conference in Washington, D.C. In attendance at the Capitol Climate Action were Bill McKibben, Terry Tempest Williams, Phil Radford, Wendell Berry, Robert Kennedy Junior, Judy Bonds and many more prominent figures of the climate justice movement were in attendance.

There were multiple acts of civil disobedience in 2011 to protest the United States Government's policies regarding oil drilling and land leasing issues (such as BLM permits for oil, oil shale, fracking, mountaintop removal etc.) In April nine young activists were arrested for singing in Congress during session. Four hundred climate justice activists staged a sit-in 18 April 2011 for at the US Department of the Interior where they sat down and sang. Twenty one were arrested ranging in age from 18-75. Multiple actions protesting ill health caused by burning fossil fuels at coal-fired power plants took place in 2011 including an action in Chicago. Since the start of the Barack Obama administration, 2600 people have been arrested for protesting energy policy and associated health issues.

== See also ==
- Extinction Rebellion
