= Vibroacoustic disease =

- Causes: low frequency noise

Vibroacoustic disease is a medical condition manifested in those who have had long-term exposure (≥ 10 yr) to large pressure amplitude (≥ 90 dB SPL) and low frequency noise (≤ 500 Hz). The disease could lead to heart arrhythmia or even death.

== Vibroacoustic disease and sonic booms ==
During protests over the closure of the Roosevelt Roads Naval Base in Puerto Rico, it was asserted that the noise created by the Navy's testing had negatively affected the health of civilians living on Vieques. In a study conducted for Puerto Rican Governor Calderon, 48 of the 50 Vieques residents tested were diagnosed as suffering from a thickening of heart tissue caused by exposure to sonic booms. Simultaneously, the Ponce School of Medicine conducted an independent study and found other data to confirm the presence of vibroacoustic disease: 79% of Viequenses fishermen have thickened heart tissue, which is the main symptom of vibroacoustic disease. The federal Agency for Toxic Substances & Disease Registry reviewed Ponce School of Medicine study and concluded in 2001 that the Vieques heart study failed to provide any "clinically significant" evidence of heart disease.

== See also ==
- Havana syndrome
