= United States Navy in Vieques, Puerto Rico =

U.S. naval facility located on the island of Vieques

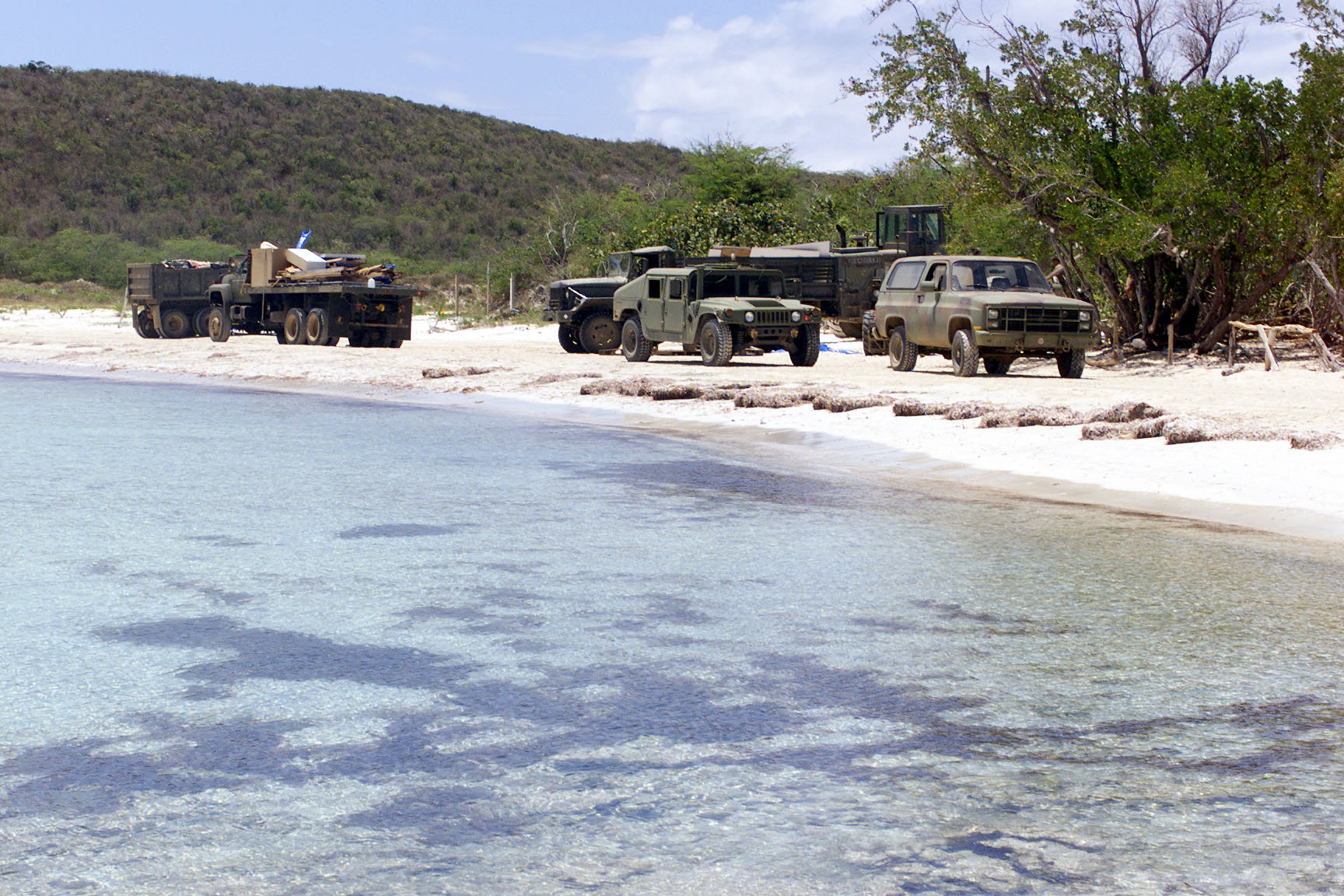
U.S. Navy vehicles on a beach at Camp Garcia, Vieques, 5 May 2000

The Vieques, Puerto Rico, Naval Training Range was a United States naval facility located on the island of Vieques, about 5 miles (8.0 km) east of mainland Puerto Rico. Starting in November 1941, the navy used the range for military exercises. Military operations ended in 2001, with the Navy completely leaving the area in 2003.

The operations were repeatedly protested by locals, for concerns related to the environmental damage and related health consequences caused by using the area for ordnance practice. These protests reached national attention during the Navy–Vieques protests in 1999. Upon the shutdown of the military operations, there was a cleanup process that was continuing into the mid 2010s and the ongoing cleanup costs were some of the most expensive decommissioned sites being cleaned up by the military. However, the landscape still is heavily contaminated with chemicals, depleted uranium and other materials, especially in the former ordinance area.

== Searching for a location ==
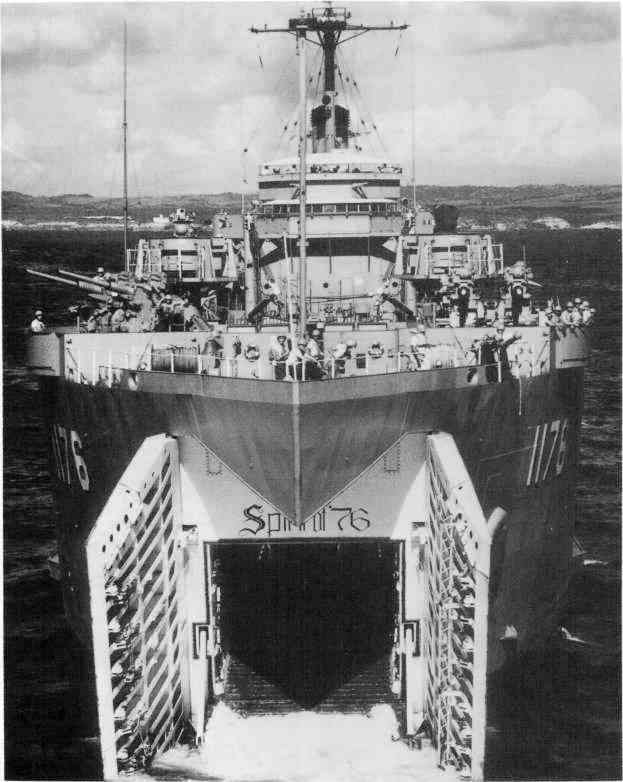
USS Graham County (LST-1176) beached at Vieques, Puerto Rico, 1964

The Department of the Navy started searching for a location to situate a naval base during the 1940s. Land was sold at a fair price to wealthy land owners at a fixed price while other smaller native land owners and tenant farmers were sometimes not compensated for their land, and relocated elsewhere on the island or forced to leave. The acquiring of land happened between 1941 and 1950, consisting of two parcels making up 22,000 acres or about two-thirds of the island. Of that, 8,000 acres on the western end of the island was primarily used as a naval ammunition depot until the property was returned to the Municipality of Vieques on May 1, 2001.

The eastern end of the island was used for live training exercises, ship-to-shore gunfire, air-to-ground bombing and US Marine amphibious landings starting from the 1940s onward. Within that area was a 900-acre Live Impact Area (LIA) used for targeting live ordnance. The LIA was located at the eastern tip of the island and away from the civilian population.

== Description of the Navy's facilities ==
The former Vieques Naval Training Range (VNTR) is located on the eastern half and the former Naval Ammunition Support Detachment (NASD) is located on the western one-third of the island. Located between these military sites lay the local civilian communities of Isabel Segunda and Esperanza.

=== Operations on East Vieques ===
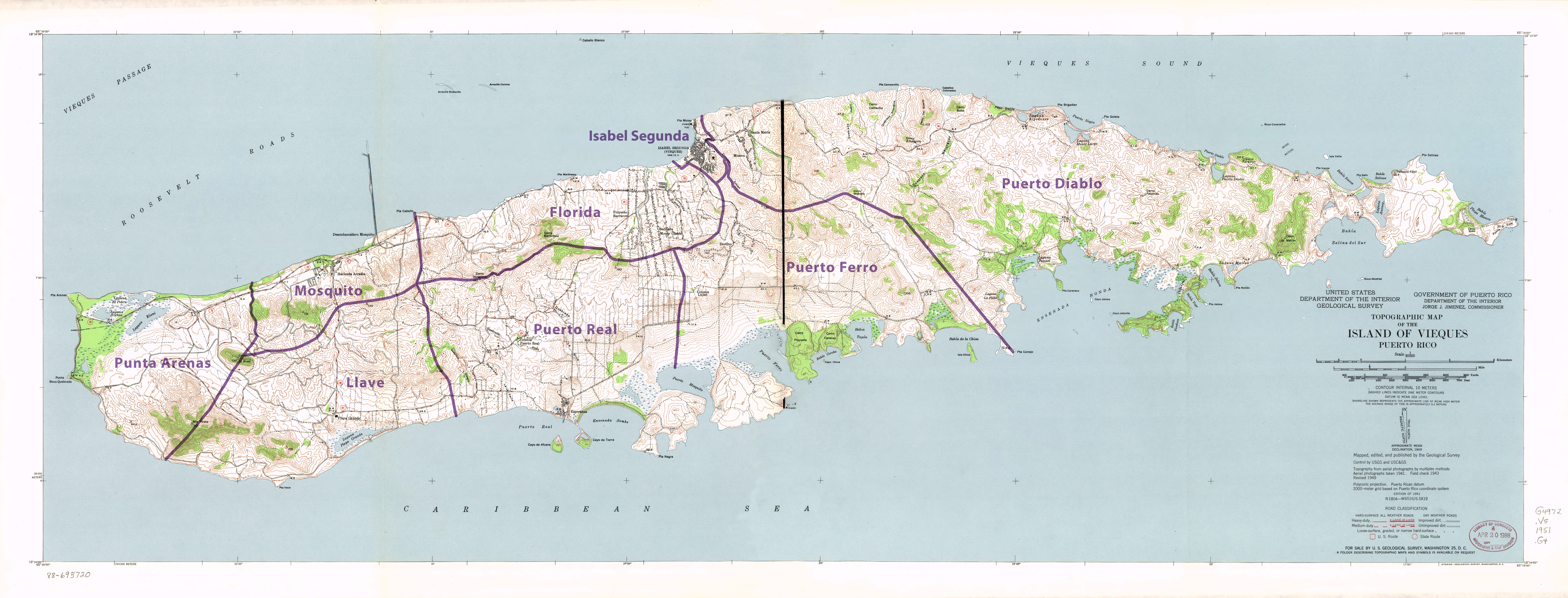
Topographic map of the Island of Vieques, Puerto Rico 1951

The former VNTR, which comprises approximately 14,573 acres, provided ground warfare and amphibious training for Marines, naval gunfire support training, and air to ground training. The former VNTR was divided into four separate operational areas, comprising from west to east: the Eastern Maneuver Area (EMA), the Surface Impact Area (SIA), the Live Impact Area (LIA), and the Eastern Conservation Area (ECA) at the easternmost tip of the island.

— CH2M Hill, Site Management Plan Fiscal Year 2015 - Atlantic Fleet Weapons Training Area - Vieques, Prepared for Department of the Navy Naval Facilities Engineering Command Atlantic

=== Operations on West Vieques ===
Military operations on the west side of the island had been focused on storing and processing of supplies and the disposal of waste. Sites identified for environmental clean-up include the following:

- A former general waste dump at a mangrove swamp in Laguna Arenas along Highway 200.
- The site of a 1970 underground storage tank for waste oil removed from the former public works area in 1996.
- A former asphalt plant on the south side of Route 200, which operated from the 1960s until 1998.

An environmental baseline survey discovered a munitions open-burn/open-detonation area on the western tip of the island surrounding Punta Boca Quebrada. Further surveying identified 16 possible open-burn/open-detonation sites in the area. As a result, 24 acres of roads and beaches were inspected for munitions, cleared of munitions with clean up completed in December 2011.

== Base closure and clean-up ==
After the base was closed, Puerto Rico Governor Sila Calderon requested Vieques be placed on the U.S. National Priorities List as a designated superfund clean-up site. As of 2014 the EPA has listed the following contaminants and ordnances at the western portion of the naval station: unexploded ordnance UXO, remnants of exploded ordnance, mercury, lead, copper, magnesium, lithium, napalm, depleted uranium along with other unspecified materials. In addition to these, the eastern portion of the site "may also include" polychlorinated biphenyls (PCB), solvents and pesticides.

Both US Navy and EPA are coordinating efforts to clean up Vieques.

On the Munitions Response Program, the Navy recently completed an expanded range assessment at the former Vieques Naval Training Range (VNTR). The Navy is also conducting a time critical removal action (TCRA) of munitions and explosives of concern (MEC), equivalent or larger than 20 mm, on the surface at the former Live Impact Area (LIA) and Eastern Conservation Area (ECA), Non-Time Critical Removal Action (NTCRA) of MEC on the surface at the Surface Impact Area (SIA), and NTCRA of subsurface MEC at selected roads and beaches within the former Vieques Naval Training Range.

Under the Environmental Restoration Program, the navy conducted a Remedial Investigation/Feasibility Study (RI/FS) at seven sites at the Former Naval Ammunition Support Detachment at west Vieques. Also, four NTCRA's were conducted for the removal of solid waste piles/debris and completed in FY09. On September 2008, a ROD was issued for one operable unit, AOC H. A ROD for AOC J, R and SWMU-7 (NASD) was signed on September 21, 2011 and SWMU-1 (VNTR) on September 29, 2011.

Thirty Six (36) operable units has been investigated at the former VNTR. A decision was reached on ten (10) sites for No action. Site Inspection/Expanded Site Inspection (SI/ESI) for 26 operable units was completed in FY09. Five TCRA were completed and seventeen NTCRA, six RI/FS, three SI/ESI, and one EE/CA are underway."

As of 2007 the Navy was to "conduct an environmental investigation of its previously owned property under the federal Resource Conservation and Recovery Act (RCRA) to determine what cleanup actions" were needed. The EPA has provided "technical assistance and guidance to the Navy on environmental issues related to the land transfer in western Vieques." Early on it was noted that, it would be difficult to discover what measures the U.S. must take, because thick jungle growth hampers testing for contaminants. Furthermore, jungle growth cannot be easily removed because the forests are littered with unexploded ordnance.

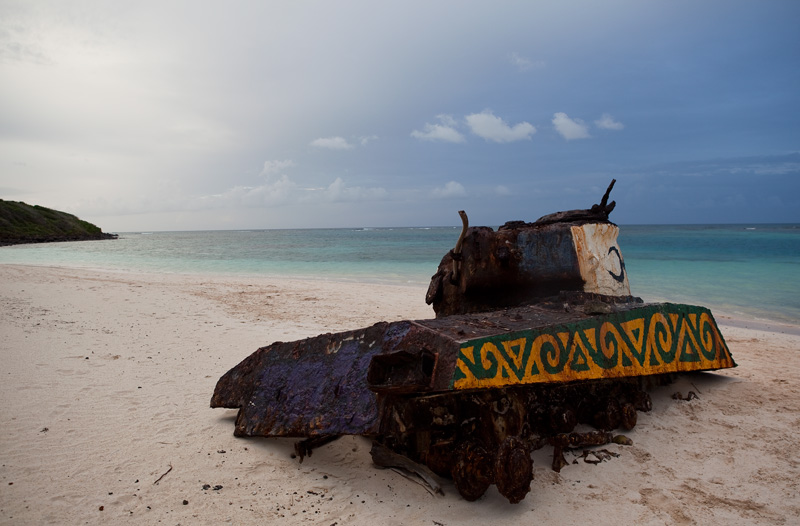
Tank remains on Flamenco Beach in Culebra

For the remainder of Fiscal Year 2015 Congress appropriated $17 million for the cleanup of Vieques, and $1.4 million for the cleanup of Culebra. As of 2014, the Navy has spent about $220 million since 2003, to investigate and clean contaminated lands on Vieques. Since 2007, about half of the money budgeted for munitions removal has been awarded to 23 local companies in Puerto Rico. As of 2014, "the Navy spends more money each year to clean up Vieques than it is spending to clean up any other former Navy installation in the US" and clean-up efforts are to continue through 2032.

== Protests against U.S. Navy 1999 ==
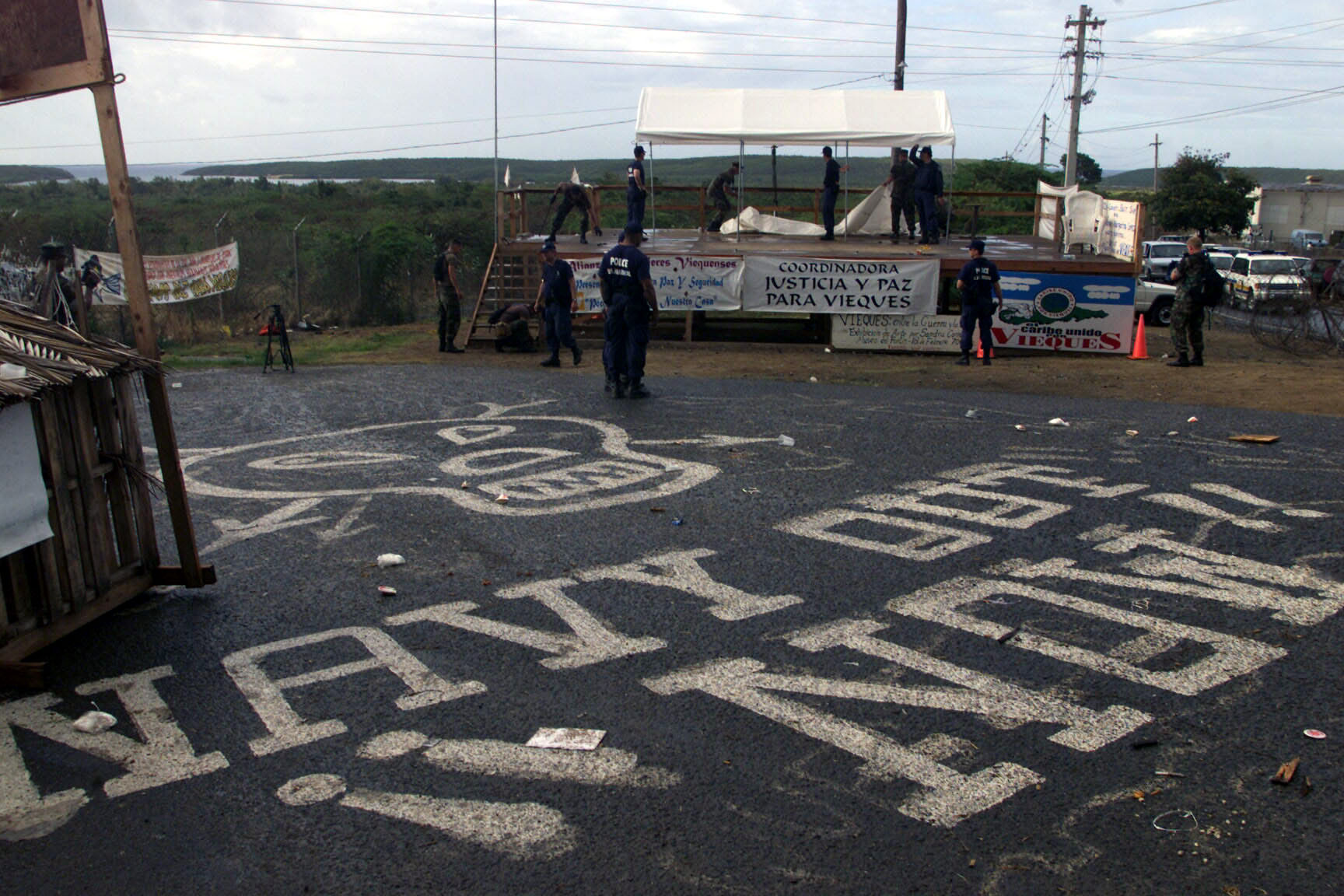
U.S. Navy officials dismantling makeshift buildings erected by protesters.

In 1999, protests began against the use of the Vieques for bombing practice by the United States Navy and United States Marine Corps after David Sanes, a civilian employed as a security guard by the US Navy, died from a stray bomb while observing a routine exercise. As a consequence of this many Vieques citizens and Puerto Rican activists from other towns (Ruben Berrios, Tito Kayak, etc.) began activism against the military presence in Vieques, which included illegally entering the live -fire areas at the military reservation. Other important activists calling for closure of the facility included Jesse Jackson, Robert Kennedy Jr., Al Sharpton, US Representative Luis Gutiérrez D-IL, US Representative Nydia Velázquez D-NY, Rigoberta Menchú and Edward James Olmos (the last was jailed in Puerto Rico for trespassing on federal property).

President Clinton asked Secretary of Defense William Cohen to establish a special panel to study the situation. The four-member panel was chaired by Frank Rush, the then-acting Assistant Secretary of Defense for force management policy, and is consequently sometimes called the Rush panel. The panel laid out history and legal situation, and released its report with 11 recommendations on October 19, 1999.

In January 2000, President Clinton and then Governor of Puerto Rico, Pedro Rosselló, together called for a referendum on Vieques. This was first scheduled for November 2001, and then rescheduled for January 2002. The referendum would let voters choose to either end the military's use of the range by May 2003, or alternatively, allow military operations to continue indefinitely.

On April 27, 2001, the Navy resumed operations and protesting resumed. On June 14, 2001, the George W. Bush administration ordered the end of military training operations on Vieques in May 2003. The Bush decision superseded previous actions of the Clinton Administration.

Fort Bundy which was part in the Roosevelt Roads Naval Station and partially on Vieques, was also affected by the protests. President George W. Bush granted Puerto Rico the rights to operate the former military possessions in Vieques, including Fort Bundy. As a consequence of President Bush's decision, the Roosevelt Roads Naval Station became NAPR (Naval Activity Puerto Rico), where DoD Police provided security, but remained a military installation.

The protesters were ultimately successful: in May 2003, the Atlantic Fleet Weapons Training Facility on Vieques Island was closed, and in May 2004, the U.S. Navy's last remaining base on Puerto Rico, the Roosevelt Roads Naval Station – which employed 1,000 local contractors and contributed $300 million to the local economy – was closed.

== Protester history ==
=== David Sanes ===
On April 19, 1999, a civilian employee named David Sanes Rodríguez was killed when military ordnance was dropped too close to his security post. According to a Congressional research report, a Marine Corps F-18 dropped two 500-pound bombs striking the security post killing Rodriguez and injuring four others. The F-18 was on a training mission when the incident occurred. The Congressional report states the ordnance was dropped "within the overall range perimeter." After this incident the range was temporarily closed.

The death of Rodriguez triggered a wave of protests from local residents. Then U.S. President Clinton promised, later reiterated by his successor George W. Bush, that the navy would leave Vieques by May 2003.

=== Encampments ===
A few months after Sanes's death, small wooden structures were erected inside the practice grounds, and encampments from all over the island-municipality started to attract attention.

By that time, the protests had also started to gain international attention, and people from all over the world joined the struggle. Many celebrities, including the political leader Ruben Berrios, singers Danny Rivera, Robi Draco Rosa and Ricky Martin, boxer Félix "Tito" Trinidad, writers Ana Lydia Vega and Giannina Braschi, American actor Edward James Olmos and Guatemala's Nobel Prize winner Rigoberta Menchú supported the cause, as did Robert F. Kennedy, Jr., Al Sharpton, and the Rev. Jesse Jackson. Pope John Paul II once said that he wanted peace for Vieques. The Archbishop of San Juan, Roberto González Nieves, was heavily involved in the protests that took place in the municipality. He managed to put together a coalition of different Puerto Rican church leaders that gathered international attention. Olmos, Sharpton and Kennedy also served jail time; while serving his prison term in Puerto Rico, Kennedy's wife Mary gave birth to the couple's sixth child, a son they named Aidan Caohman Vieques Kennedy.

The Movimiento Socialista de Trabajadores held a series of incursions into the bombing ranges to halt the bombing without being arrested, and a few of them were successful in that second objective.

=== Massive occupation of practice range ===
On May 4, 2000, civil disobedience encampments inside the practice grounds were evacuated by U.S. Marshals, Marines and Navy.

Five days later, in an internationally covered event, hundreds of protesters and supporters from all over the world and with different ideologies, penetrated the military practice grounds. Natives of Vieques, many Puerto Ricans, Hollywood celebrities, priests, pastors, friars, athletes, and politicians including U.S. Representatives Luis Gutiérrez and Nydia Velázquez were among them. The incursion had been well publicized and resulted in the arrest of the protesters by Marshals, as both sides of the struggle wanted to avoid brushes with the military.

With non-violence as the main objective of the protests, the protesters behaved in a peaceful manner upon their arrest, shouting "Paz para Vieques" ("Peace for Vieques"). Others sang themes related to peace or religion. A few had to be removed by force but didn't offer physical resistance or insult the officials. Many protesters were set free a few hours after being jailed, others were released a few days later. Only a few had sentences imposed that lasted between one and six months. The official charge was trespassing on U.S. military territory.

=== Incursions continue, protests come to an end ===
With the continuation of bombing practices by the U.S. Navy, incursions to the practice grounds continued, until the U.S. government announced that the military would be leaving the island in May 2003.

On March 31, 2004, the United States closed its Roosevelt Roads Naval Station on mainland Puerto Rico. A skeleton staff of 200, down from approximately 1,200 civilian and 700 military personnel, stayed on at the facility until the transfer of the property was completed. The closure of the base at Roosevelt Roads resulted in a substantial financial loss to the economy of Puerto Rico that the Navy estimates at $250 to $300 million a year. Admiral Robert J. Natter, commander of the Atlantic Fleet, is on record as saying: "Without Vieques there is no way I need the Navy facilities at Roosevelt Roads — none. It's a drain on Defense Department and taxpayer dollars."

Nevertheless, the government of Puerto Rico has announced that the airport at the base will be reopened, and will become a major Caribbean air cargo hub, relieving Luis Muñoz Marín International Airport and extending its useful life indefinitely without the need for property expansion. It will also be used to centralize general aviation activities now dispersed over several municipal airports, saving the Puerto Rico Ports Authority significant sums of money on maintenance and other costs. Other plans are in motion to make use of other sections of the former base to benefit the local economy. A large portion of the undeveloped land in the property is being set aside for ecological preservation.

=== Further protests ===
On April 30, 2003 many supporters of the Cause of Vieques traveled to the island-municipality to hold a celebration inside the past bombing practice grounds. The event was recorded by national TV news. On May 1, 2003, the crowd entered the former bombing range en masse. Their celebration turned aggressive, in contrast to the peaceful protests held by some of them a few months earlier.

The Police Task force of Puerto Rico was mobilized from the main island, as were the Police of Vieques, and other previously mobilized law enforcement officials, who were unprepared for the now-violent celebration. The president of the Teachers Federation of Puerto Rico, and a leader of the cause, was recorded by TV cameras engaging in violent and destructive behavior. The crowd destroyed a former Navy guard-house and military trucks with drop hammers. The TV footage was used as evidence to criminally indict the vandals, as the property destroyed was now owned by the NRCS.

Those indicted said that their behavior was caused by the resentment and bitterness that had accumulated from the decades of suffering due to the Navy's bombing practices on the island. Norma Burgos, a Senator of Puerto Rico, who had formerly been imprisoned for trespassing on the bombing range several months earlier, justified the behavior by comparing it to the fall of Saddam Hussein's statue in the recent invasion of Iraq — in which U.S. soldiers used an Army tank (a property of the U.S. government) to tear it down. Their defense failed, and more than a dozen of those charged were imprisoned for "damages and destruction of public property."

== Military withdrawal 2001-2003 ==
In 2001, the United States Navy left western Vieques, which had been used as an ammunition depot. Now the United States Fish and Wildlife Service controls 3,100 acres (13 km²) of this land — about half of the formerly owned military property. Over the course of U.S. Navy occupancy, nearly 22 million pounds (10,000 tonnes) of military and industrial waste, such as oils, solvents, lubricants, lead paint, acid and 55 US gallon (200 L) drums, were deposited on the western portion of the island. As cited by McCaffrey, according to the Universidad Metropolitana, the extent of leaching is unknown. In 2005 the Navy was investigating 17 potentially contaminated sites.

On May 1, 2003 the Navy finished turning over all of its lands to the U.S. Department of the Interior. This included the Navy's entire eastern portion of the island — 14,573 acres (58.97 km^{2}), which had mainly been used as a dumping ground. McCaffrey cites data from the U.S. Navy: "Vieques was bombed an average of 180 days per year. In 1998, the last year before protests interrupted maneuvers, the navy dropped 23,000 bombs on the island, the majority of which contained explosives."

The live impact range, which is the most contaminated zone, was given the highest protected environmental status, that of a "wilderness preserve." The Fish and Wildlife Service states that Vieques Wildlife Refuge is an ecologically diverse Caribbean wildlife refuge. The EPA has declared the refuge a superfund site. Much of the lands are now termed wildlife refuges, meaning that humans are not allowed on the land, therefore allowing the Navy to avoid cleanup. Whether or not the U.S. made the land a wildlife refuge to avoid cleaning up the island is debated.

== Contamination and health effects ==
A survey by the Puerto Rico Health Department revealed that the cancer rate in Vieques is 27% higher than mainland Puerto Rico. In a 2001 federal lawsuit, Vieques' environmental groups and residents accused the Navy of causing "more damage than any other single actor in the history of Puerto Rico". The prosecutors stated that the Navy's activities contaminated much of the eastern portion of the island with a wide range of toxic substances. As cited by Franciscans International, according to the Navy's figures, throughout the course of six decades about 5 million pounds (2,000 t) of ordnance was dropped on Vieques every year. Ordnance included toxic compounds and elements such as arsenic, lead, mercury, cadmium, depleted uranium and napalm, and tons of a fiberglass-like substance. Most of these toxins are persistent and may bioaccumulate.

For decades environmentalists have complained that contaminants from naval exercises have spread to other parts of the island though the air, water, and soil. The people of Vieques live downwind from where the bombing was done; thus toxins that can be airborne — such as depleted uranium — could easily come in contact with civilians. Representative Charles Rangel (D-NY) investigated contamination in Vieques and discovered that

A number of studies conducted by well-qualified scientists from universities in the United States and in Puerto Rico reveal that there is a high probability that the compounds released by the Navy exercises and chemical testing created toxic levels in the environment and could be the cause of serious medical conditions affecting the people of Vieques.

The same newspaper article reported that a study by the Puerto Rico Health Department cited high levels of heavy metals in plants, animals and humans and that high levels of heavy metals appear to be causing increased cancer and infant mortality rates, and childhood asthma. In the 980 acres (4.0 km^{2}) live impact range on the eastern tip of island, studies have shown that the ground water is contaminated by nitrates and explosives. Furthermore, unexploded weapons, ordnance, and sunken barges litter the floor of the Caribbean Sea. Testing done in the Icacos Lagoon showed concentrations of cadmium in crabs to be 1,000 times higher than the World Health Organization's "tolerable ingestion maximum dosage." Furthermore, toxic levels of heavy metals, including lead, arsenic, selenium, mercury and zinc, have been found in several species of fish. In the lawsuit conducted by environmentalists and the people of Vieques against the Navy, the prosecutors noted that most residents of Vieques use many of these same species of fish as a source of food. Cadmium and arsenic are carcinogenic. One study from 1999 that tested hair samples from various age groups of Vieques residents revealed that 69% were contaminated with cadmium and arsenic, and 34% had toxic levels of mercury.

Biologist Arturo Massol and radiochemist Elba Díaz conducted an unpublished study in 2001 that showed vegetables and plants growing in the civilian area of Vieques were highly contaminated with heavy metals such as lead, cadmium and copper. Furthermore, they discovered that metal concentrations in edible crops were both substantially above the maximum levels set by the European Union Council and much higher than plants tested in mainland Puerto Rico. Chilies, pasture grasses, and squashes were affected more than plants with deeper root systems such as trees. This is consistent with the theory that heavy metals travel by air to civilian areas via the steady easterly trade winds that blow directly from the bombing zone.

Mercury affects the brain, cardiovascular system, kidneys and the developing fetus. According to a 2006 newspaper article there is a study by the Puerto Rico Health Department which linked abnormally high levels of asthma in children to mercury contamination. In 2004, the infant mortality rate in Vieques was 55% higher than the other 77 municipalities in Puerto Rico—a rate of almost 20 per 1000 live births as opposed to 12.8.

On November 17, 2002, Milivi Adams, Vieques native, died from cancer. Her death became a symbol in the battle against the military presence on the island.

=== Depleted uranium ===
In addition to the toxic materials that the Navy had been dropping on Vieques since the 1940s, in 1999 the Navy accidentally fired depleted uranium bullets ("DU"). The Navy admitted to firing just 263 rounds of depleted uranium bullets. Based on a report by RAND, a research corporation, the U.S. Department of Defense claims DU doesn't compromise human health. However, Dan Fahey, the Director of Research at the Gulf War Resource Center, points out that the RAND report was incomplete: it ignored 68 relevant sources that show clear relationships between DU and harm to human health.

=== Nuclear target ship wreck ===
In 1958, the veteran World War II Fletcher Class Destroyer USS Killen (DD593) served as a target ship for wreckage during the atom bomb tests in Operation Hardtack I at the Pacific Proving Grounds (shots WAHOO and UMBRELLA). In 1962, it was towed to Chesapeake Bay where it was engaged in further tests to assess the structural effects of the ship's nuclear exposures. Killen was struck from the Naval Vessel Register and sent to the US Naval Station at Roosevelt Roads in January 1963 to be used as a target ship for missile and gunnery practice, where she was eventually sunk/scuttled in a shallow bay in 1975 and still lies as of 2010. The wreckage is present on the bay floor and is absent all structures from its main deck including nearly all the main decking itself and a portion of the ship's stern is missing. Thousands of tons of the ship are missing.

Studies and site visits made in 1999 by a Puerto Rican marine archaeologist and the University of Georgia discovered nearly two hundred steel barrels of unknown origin and contents among the wreckage of the Killen. Based on government descriptions of the nuclear tests in the Pacific, some scientists and Vieques environmental activists have been concerned that nuclear-fallout cleaning materials were stored inside those barrels and improperly disposed, possibly entering the local environment prior to sinking or exposing contaminants to the animals and habitat of Bahia Salina del Sur in Vieques after sinking.

In 2003, a team from the University of Georgia conducted radiological and toxicological tests of the wreckage using underwater detection equipment. The report discussed testing the interiors of the steel barrels at the wreck site of four intact barrels and five 'open' ones, that were probed with a siphon-extraction tube. They found that the wreck site did not present elevated radiological signatures in the ship's hull or in the interior components of the barrels. The report raised concerns about possible contamination from ordnance at the site. As of 2010 the origin and contents of the barrels are still unknown.

=== Sonic booms ===
It had been asserted that the noise created by the Navy's testing had negatively affected the health of civilians living on Vieques. In a study conducted for Puerto Rican Governor Calderon, 48 of the 50 Vieques residents tested were diagnosed as suffering from vibroacoustic disease — a thickening of heart tissue caused by exposure to sonic booms. Simultaneously, the Ponce School of Medicine conducted an independent study and found other data to confirm the presence of vibroacoustic disease: 79% of Viequenses fishermen have thickened heart tissue, which is the main symptom of vibroacoustic disease. This disease is said to lead to heart arrhythmia, or even death.

The Ponce School of Medicine study was reviewed by the United States Agency for Toxic Substances and Disease Registry (ATSDR). The tapes of echocardiograms, which measured the pericardial thickness, were blind-coded and sent to the Mayo Clinic to repeat without knowledge of whether study subjects were from Vieques or from the control group. It concluded in 2001 that "there is no evidence from the Vieques Heart Study to indicate clinically significant heart disease".

== Criticism of health risks ==
The areas that were used for burning expired ammunition take up a bit less than 300 acres (1.2 km²) and the Navy has agreed to clean up the sites according to EPA standards. At a press conference in 2001 Robert B. Pirie, Under Secretary of the Navy, said that: "our training poses no danger and little burden to Viequenses and is absolutely vital to our national security".

Pirie claimed that most of the studies linking the Navy's actions to the decline of public health were done by researchers affiliated with the Puerto Rico Independence Party, and that "none of the health-related allegations made have stood-up to credible scientific scrutiny or universally accepted legal standards". Pirie also claimed that the National Cancer Institute had said that cancer rates in many major U.S. cities are actually higher than the cancer rates in Vieques. In fact, the institute cautioned that the variations in the rates could be attributed to chance, given the small population on Vieques. According to Pirie the figures drawn from the Carmen Feliciano data about an increased infant mortality rate in Vieques are misleading because the studies that used her information omitted a range of data. According to him, when that data was factored in the infant mortality rate was actually lower than that in the rest of Puerto Rico. On behalf of the Navy, Johns Hopkins University School of Hygiene and Public Health conducted a review of the study on vibroacoustic disease done by the Vieques government. The 2001 review found no evidence to conclude that vibroacoustic disease symptoms on Vieques were due to noise from Navy exercises. Furthermore, Pirie claimed that the report suggested that vibroacoustic disease may not actually exist.

=== ATSDR study ===
The ATSDR tested for hazardous materials in the water, air and soil in order to determine whether the health of the Viequenses were at risk. It found that either the Navy had not affected the environment or that the Navy had affected it so minimally that the contamination would pose no threat to human health. However, other scientists contend that ATSDR's studies were incomplete. The ATSDR is notorious for denying links between community contamination and health affects. After monitoring the ATSDR for ten years, Linda King of the Environmental Health Network reported that only one ATSDR study among hundreds has found contaminants in the community to be the cause of health problems.

In 2003 the ATSDR determined that it is safe to eat seafood from all waters and coastal lands around the island of Vieques. Even though several metals were detected in the local seafood, ATSDR concluded that the metals would not pose a health risk even if a person ate fish and shellfish every day for 70 years.

It acknowledged that Navy training has elevated the levels of some metals in the soil of the former Live Impact Area, but holds that the levels are too low to harm humans. It concluded that "the public had not been exposed to depleted uranium contamination above normal background (naturally occurring) levels". It found that the air does not contain dangerous levels of chemicals. It claimed that at eight miles, the Live Impact Area is too far from residential areas for airborne dust and contaminants from training activities to be concentrated enough to cause harm when coming in contact with civilians. It determined that Naval training and testing has in no way affected the drinking water on Vieques. Usually most of the island's drinking water comes through an underwater pipeline from mainland Puerto Rico. The ATSDR report concluded that groundwater from the former Live Impact Area cannot contaminate the wells due to geological barriers, and although there were high levels of nitrates in some wells, this was due to local, most likely agricultural, sources. It cautioned that it is not safe for children and pregnant women to drink water from the contaminated wells.

=== ATSDR study contested and redacted ===
The ATSDR avoided drawing links between the navy training and health concerns on Vieques. For example, the agency neglected to test several relevant wells, including the Sun Bay Wells, which serve as the backup water supply for Vieques in case the pipeline from mainland Puerto Rico breaks down. Furthermore, the navy's claim that groundwater from the testing site cannot reach residential groundwater supplies may be false. At a public meeting, when asked why the navy had installed monitoring wells designed to track the spread of explosive contaminants between the impact area and the civilian area, the ATSDR refused to comment. The ATSDR also did not adequately emphasize negative findings in their report, such as the high levels of benzene —more than four times the maximum allowed, which were found in a groundwater well on the navy's property. By 2009 the ATSDR had rescinded many of their early conclusions in the face of mounting criticism.

== See also ==
- Susana Centeno Hospital
- Navy-Culebra protests
