= Tito Kayak =

Puerto Rican environmentalist and activist

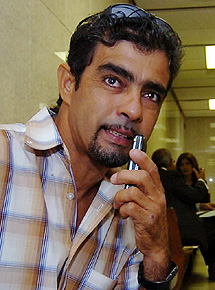
- Tito Kayak, photographed inside a courthouse in Puerto Rico by Andre Kang for the newspaper Primera Hora
- Born: Alberto de Jesús Mercado; 1958 (age 67–68)
- Other name: Tito Kayak
- Occupations: Environmentalist and activist
- Years active: c. 1990s–present
- Known for: Environmental activism

Alberto de Jesús Mercado (born 1958), better known as Tito Kayak, is an activist from Jayuya, Puerto Rico, and founder of the Puerto Rican environmental group, Amig@s Del Mar. The organization utilizes a dual approach, which they call "manatiburón (manatee/shark)", which Kayak describes as a combination of "peaceful and simple ways to fulfill our environmental ideals" (like the manatee), and the more “revolutionary approach" (like the shark), which is "only used when we are prohibited from working peacefully towards our goals of improving the environment." Kayak is best known for his activism against the damaging environmental effect of the U.S. Navy presence on Vieques.

== Protest involvement ==
=== Raising of Puerto Rican flag at Statue of Liberty ===
On November 5, 2000, Tito Kayak and five other Vieques activists stepped onto the top deck of the Statue of Liberty in New York City in protest and Kayak then placed a Puerto Rican flag on the statue's crown.

=== Carolina apartment complex protest ===
On March 15, 2005, Kayak chained himself to a vehicle after entering a Marriott Hotel property on a Carolina, Puerto Rico, beach to protest against the building of an apartment complex. "Like many other Puerto Ricans, they were concerned about the Courtyard Marriott Hotel’s plan to expand in an area contiguous to the terrestrial marine zone and located on a beach area used by families and workers for recreation. If the construction were allowed to continue, it would have had a substantial negative impact on the environment and make the public beach inaccessible, to non-hotel guests."

=== Raising of Puerto Rican flag at the United Nations ===
On June 13, 2005, Kayak was arrested inside the United Nations headquarters in New York City after he attempted to switch the United Nations flag with the Puerto Rican one, while the United Nations Special Committee on Decolonization discussed the political status of Puerto Rico. He was subsequently (October 11, 2013) found not guilty by a Manhattan Criminal Court judge of the filed State charge but was fined $500 for trespassing.

=== Arrest in Israel while in support of the Palestine cause ===
On April 20, 2007, Kayak was arrested in Israel after he climbed a surveillance tower near Israel's West Bank apartheid wall and planted a Palestinian flag in support of Palestine. Kayak spent about five hours in the tower, before climbing down. After his arrest, Kayak stated that "All I did was to express my identification with the villagers against the wall which is believed to be evil and illegal by the whole world and many leaders like Nelson Mandela, Jimmy Carter and the United Nations".

=== San Juan's Paseo Caribe crane case ===
On November 14, 2007, Kayak climbed the construction cranes at the Paseo Caribe project in San Juan, Puerto Rico, and remained perched on the crane for one week. In a daring escape, Kayak rappelled down from the crane and unto a red kayak in the water below while police officers were kept at bay by his supporters. Tito Kayak then rowed himself under a bridge whose clearance was too low for the police powerboats and switched out of the kayak, so when the kayak was apprehended he was no longer on board. Meanwhile, he swam across to the other shore. When he was spotted by the police helicopters, supporters jumped into the water further confusing the police and facilitating Kayak's final getaway.

=== Commemorating David Sanes' death ===
On April 14, 2009, during the anniversary celebrations of David Sanes's death, Tito Kayak arrived at the former bombing range of Vieques, a restricted area operated by the Federal Fish and Wildlife, and painted a sign saying "Bieke or Death. The Struggle Continues" ("Bieke" was a reference to the Taíno name for Vieques) on the former navy Operation Post (OP). Sanes, a civilian Navy security guard, had died 10 years earlier victim of a U.S. Navy bomb while on duty at the Operation Post.

=== 2010–2011 University of Puerto Rico strike activism ===
On January 25, 2011, Puerto Rico Police officers arrested a number of protesters who, using Civil Disobedience, attempted to bar entry and exit from the University of Puerto Rico, Río Piedras Campus, during the 2010–2011 University of Puerto Rico strikes. One of the protesters, wearing a hood, was later found to be Tito Kayak.

=== 2012 Oscar López Rivera incarceration ===
On 7 June 2012, Tito Kayak started a two-leg, lone high seas voyage from Ciudad Bolivar, Venezuela to San Juan, Puerto Rico, and then from San Juan, Puerto Rico to Washington, D.C., USA, to protest the U.S. incarceration of Puerto Rican political prisoner Oscar López Rivera. López Rivera is said to be "among the longest held political prisoners in the history of Puerto Rico and in the world."

== Legacy ==
An amendment to the Puerto Rico penal code (Article 208A) is largely attributed as a reaction to Tito Kayak’s protests against urban and commercial development and is commonly known as The Tito Kayak Law (even though there is no such declaration in the law itself). The Law attempted to criminalize activism at construction sites.

Law 149 of 2004 was amended by Law No. 158 of 2010, adding Article 208-A which made it a felony to enter, without authorization, a properly approved construction site for the purpose of temporarily or permanently obstructing work. It also penalized the occupation of the construction site's associated land or equipment. Although the legislative act makes no mention of the Tito Kayak name nor exists any such designation in the amendment proper, the legislation is commonly cited in the press as "Ley Tito Kayak" (Tito Kayak Law) and has entered the local lexicon as such. In March 2013, Tito Kayak celebrated as the Law was declared unconstitutional by a Commonwealth of Puerto Rico judge sitting at the Ponce Superior Court.

== See also ==
- List of Puerto Ricans
