= Agency for Toxic Substances and Disease Registry =

US federal agency

Agency overview
- Formed: December 31, 1980 (authorized); April 19, 1983 (created); June 11, 1985 (formally organized)
- Jurisdiction: Federal government of the United States
- Headquarters: 4770 Buford Highway NE, Atlanta, Georgia, 30341; 33.8788°N 84.2923°W
- Employees: 228 FTE (FY2022)
- Annual budget: US$78 million (FY2021)
- Agency executives: Jay Bhattacharya, MD, PhD, Acting Director, CDC and Administrator, ATSDR; Aaron Bernstein, MD, MPH, Director, NCEH/ATSDR; Pamela Protzel Berman, PhD, MPH, Deputy Director; Christopher M. Reh, PhD, Associate Director, ATSDR
- Parent department: United States Department of Health and Human Services
- Key documents: Comprehensive Environmental Response, Compensation, and Liability Act of 1980 (CERCLA or Superfund); Hazardous and Solid Waste Amendments of 1984 to the Resource Conservation and Recovery Act (RCRA); Superfund Amendments and Reauthorization Act of 1986 (SARA)
- Website: www.atsdr.cdc.gov

The Agency for Toxic Substances and Disease Registry (ATSDR) is a federal public health agency within the U.S. Department of Health and Human Services (HHS). The agency focuses on minimizing human health risks associated with exposure to hazardous substances. It works closely with other federal, state, and local agencies; tribal governments; local communities; and healthcare providers. Its mission is to "Serve the public through responsive public health actions to promote healthy and safe environments and prevent harmful exposures." ATSDR was created as an advisory, nonregulatory agency by the Superfund legislation and was formally organized in 1985.

Although ATSDR is an independent operating agency within HHS, the Centers for Disease Control and Prevention (CDC) performs many of its administrative functions. The CDC director also serves as the ATSDR administrator, and ATSDR has a joint Office of the Director with the National Center for Environmental Health (NCEH). The ATSDR headquarters are located in Atlanta, Georgia, at the CDC Chamblee campus. In fiscal year 2010, ATSDR had an operating budget of $76.8 million and had roughly 300 full-time employees (not including contractors).

The ATSDR is formally and administratively overseen by the Director of the Centers for Disease Control and Prevention (CDC), currently Jay Bhattacharya since February 2026. Direction is provided by ATSDR's Director, currently Aaron Bernstein, who ranks below the Administrator, and Deputy Director Pamela Protzel Berman.

== Overview ==
ATSDR is an agency within the US Department of Health and Human Services concerned with the effects of hazardous substances on human health. ATSDR is charged with assessing the presence and nature of health hazards at specific Superfund sites, as well as helping prevent or reduce further exposure and the illnesses that can result from such exposures. ATSDR is an oversight agency created to ensure that public health protection and environmental regulation work hand in hand.

ATSDR functions include public health assessments of National Priority List (NPL or Superfund) hazardous waste sites; petitioned health consultations or assessments concerning specific waste sites or industrial facilities that US citizens have requested further action upon; the conduct of health studies (including surveillance and registries) to determine the long-term impact of these facilities; response to emergency releases of hazardous substances, applied research in support of public health assessments, information development and dissemination, and education and training concerning hazardous substances. ATSDR also prepares toxicological profiles for hazardous substances found at National Priorities List sites, as well as at federal sites administered by the Department of Defense and Department of Energy.

== Goals ==
ATSDR has seven goals:

1. Protect the public from environmental hazards and toxic exposures.
2. Promote healthy environments.
3. Advance the science of environmental public health.
4. Support environmental public health practice.
5. Educate communities, partners, and policy makers about environmental health risks and protective measures.
6. Promote environmental justice and reduce health disparities associated with environmental exposures.
7. Provide unique scientific and technical expertise to advance public health science and practice.

== Authority ==
Unlike the Environmental Protection Agency (EPA), ATSDR is an advisory, nonregulatory agency. ATSDR conducts research on the health impacts of hazardous waste sites and provides information and recommendations to federal and state agencies, community members, and other interested parties. However, ATSDR is not involved in cleanup of those sites, nor can ATSDR provide or fund medical treatment for people who have been exposed to hazardous substances.

== History ==
In response to the environmental disasters at Love Canal and Times Beach, Missouri, Congress passed the Comprehensive Environmental Response, Compensation, and Liability Act of 1980 (CERCLA), commonly known as the Superfund legislation. CERCLA gave EPA primary responsibility for identifying, investigating, and cleaning up hazardous waste sites. CERCLA also authorized the establishment of ATSDR to assess the presence and nature of health hazards to communities living near Superfund sites, to help prevent or reduce harmful exposures, and to expand the knowledge base about the health effects that result from exposure to hazardous substances.

A 1982 lawsuit litigated by Chemical Manufacturers Association and the American Petroleum Institute forced the creation of ATSDR, which was created as an agency under the Department of Health and Human Services on April 19, 1983. James O. Mason served as the agency's first administrator. The Hazardous and Solid Waste Amendments of 1984 to the Resource Conservation and Recovery Act (RCRA) gave ATSDR additional authority related to hazardous waste storage facilities. ATSDR was charged with conducting public health assessments at these sites when requested by EPA, states, or individuals, as well as assisting EPA to determine which substances should be regulated and the levels at which chemicals may pose a threat to human health. ATSDR was formally organized as an agency on June 11, 1985. The Superfund Amendments and Reauthorization Act of 1986 (SARA) broadened ATSDR's responsibilities in the areas of public health assessments, establishment and maintenance of toxicological databases, information dissemination, and medical education.

In 2003, the position of assistant administrator was replaced with a director who is shared with NCEH.

== Organization ==
=== Administration ===
CDC Director Jay Bhattacharya, M.D., Ph.D. serves as ATSDR administrator and CDC director, heading the Office of the Administrator. Aaron Bernstein, M.D., M.P.H serves as director of NCEH/ATSDR, heading the Office of the Director. The ATSDR administrator/CDC director, who provides overall leadership of the agency, is appointed by the president of the United States; the appointment does not require Senate approval. The ATSDR administrator appoints the NCEH/ATSDR director, who is responsible for managing the agency's programs and activities.

=== Organizational structure ===
- Office of the Administrator (also CDC Director)
- Office of the Director and deputy director (also NCEH (National Center for Environmental Health) head)
  - Office of Communications
  - Office of Science
  - Office of Management and Analytics
  - Office of Policy, Partnerships, and Planning
- Office of the Associate Director
  - Office of Innovation and Analytics (OIA)
  - Office of Community Health Hazard Assessment (OCHHA)
  - Office of Capacity Development and Applied Prevention Science (OCDAPS)

The Office of the Director (of ASTDR) is joint with that of NCEH; it also contains seven functional units, five offices, five program-specific divisions to support and implement six program areas:

- Public Health Assessments
- Toxicological Profiles
- Emergency Response
- Exposure and Disease Registries
- Health Effects Research
- Health Education

=== Regional offices ===
The Division of Community Health Investigations manages an office in Washington, D.C., as well as offices in each of the 10 EPA regions:

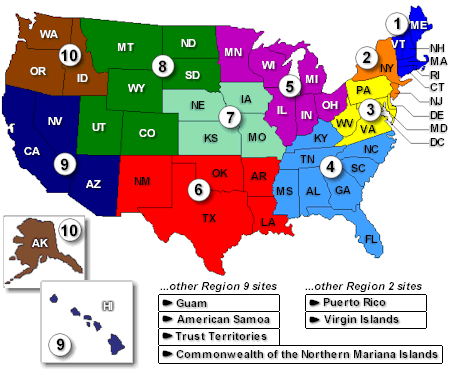
Map of the 10 ATSDR regions

- Boston (Region 1: Connecticut, Maine, Massachusetts, New Hampshire, Rhode Island, Vermont)
- New York and Edison, New Jersey (Region 2: New Jersey, New York, Puerto Rico, U.S. Virgin Islands)
- Philadelphia (Region 3: Delaware, District of Columbia, Maryland, Pennsylvania, Virginia, West Virginia)
- Atlanta (Region 4: Alabama, Florida, Georgia, Kentucky, Mississippi, North Carolina, South Carolina, Tennessee)
- Chicago (Region 5: Illinois, Indiana, Michigan, Minnesota, Ohio, Wisconsin)
- Dallas (Region 6: Arkansas, Louisiana, New Mexico, Oklahoma, Texas)
- Kansas City, Kansas (Region 7: Iowa, Kansas, Missouri, Nebraska)
- Denver and Helena, Montana (Region 8: Colorado, Montana, North Dakota, South Dakota, Utah, Wyoming)
- San Francisco (Region 9: American Samoa, Arizona, California, Guam, Hawaii, Nevada, Northern Mariana Islands, Trust Territories)
- Seattle and Anchorage, Alaska (Region 10: Alaska, Idaho, Oregon, Washington)

The regional offices work cooperatively with EPA, state and local health departments, health professionals, community groups, and other partners to implement programs and initiatives.

== Programs ==
=== Public health assessments and health consultations ===
One of ATSDR's primary responsibilities is conducting public health assessments and health consultations. The agency conducts public health assessments for all current or proposed sites on the National Priorities List (commonly known as Superfund sites). The purpose of public health assessments is to examine whether hazardous substances at a site pose a human health hazard and to issue recommendations about limiting or stopping exposure to those substances. ATSDR also conducts health consultations, often in response to requests from EPA and state and local agencies. Health consultations examine specific health questions, such as the health effects of exposure to a specific chemical at a site. Health consultations are more limited in scope than public health assessments. ATSDR also conducts public health assessments and health consultations in response to petitions from members of the public. To conduct public health assessments and health consultations, ATSDR relies on its own scientists or establishes cooperative agreements with states, providing technical assistance to state health departments. ATSDR issued more than 200 public health assessments in 2009 and provides about 1,000 health consultations each year.

When investigating sites, ATSDR examines environmental data, health data, and information from community members about how the site affects their quality of life. ATSDR normally does not collect its own environmental data; rather, it usually relies on partner organizations, such as EPA, to conduct testing and gather data. This environmental data provides information on the amount of contamination and possible ways humans could be exposed to the hazardous substances at the site. The health data provides information on rates of illness, disease, and death in the local community. Since ATSDR is an advisory agency, the conclusions in its public health assessments and health consultations are often in the form of recommendations to state and national environmental and health agencies, such as EPA, that have regulatory authority. Other agencies and the general public rely on ATSDR to provide trusted information on the health effects of hazardous substances at contaminated sites.

=== Toxicology research ===
Another major responsibility of ATSDR is producing toxicological profiles for the most common substances that are found at Superfund sites. The toxicological profiles summarize important studies on the substances' health effects. ATSDR also publishes ToxFAQs, ToxGuides, and public health statements, which summarize the health information in toxicological profiles for use by the general public and health professionals. The agency maintains a Toxic Substances Portal that compiles all of the agency's toxicology information and allows users to search by chemical. ATSDR has published toxicological profiles for more than 250 hazardous substances.

ATSDR has a computational toxicology laboratory that conducts research and modeling on the effects of toxic substances on human health. The agency's toxicology work involves pharmacokinetic/pharmacodynamic modeling, quantitative structure–activity relationship methods, and benchmark dose modeling, as well as establishing minimal risk levels for human exposure to hazardous substances. One model developed by the toxicology laboratory showed that children were much more susceptible than adults to chemical exposure from inhalation and oral exposure. In the aftermath of chemical spills and emergencies, the laboratory also conducts research for state and local health departments on the health effects of the chemicals involved.

=== Health registries ===
ATSDR maintains registries of people who were exposed to certain toxic substances or have certain diseases. Participation in these registries is voluntary, and individual data and personal information is kept private. The information collected is used by epidemiologists and other researchers to examine long-term health outcomes or risk factors for illness. It can also help doctors diagnose those health conditions in other individuals and treat them earlier. The agency also uses registries to contact registered individuals with important health information.

==== Tremolite Asbestos Registry ====
The Tremolite Asbestos Registry contains people who lived in or worked in Libby, Montana, while vermiculite was mined there; these people were at risk for exposure to the tremolite asbestos that was naturally occurring in the vermiculite. ATSDR began addressing public health concerns in Libby in 1999 and created the registry in 2004. The purpose of the registry was to monitor the long-term health effects of people in Libby exposed to tremolite asbestos and to assist with communicating important health information to registrants. Researchers have used the registry to study how asbestos exposure affects human health. This research has yielded several important findings. Registry data was used to conduct the first study of the relationship between asbestos exposure and respiratory problems in children. Another study using registry data found a significant relationship between asbestos exposure and death from cardiovascular disease.

==== World Trade Center Health Registry ====
The World Trade Center Health Registry was established in 2002 by ATSDR and the New York City Department of Health and Mental Hygiene to track the long-term physical and mental health effects of the September 11 attacks. The registry contains more than 71,000 people who lived, worked, or went to school near the World Trade Center site, as well as emergency response personnel who were involved in rescue and recovery efforts. It is the largest post-disaster health registry in the United States. Researchers use the registry to study the health effects of the disaster and to develop public health recommendations for future disasters. A 2009 study based on registry data found that posttraumatic stress disorder and asthma were the two most commonly reported conditions among registry participants five to six years after the disaster. The study found that 19% of adult participants reported new posttraumatic stress symptoms, and 10% of adult participants reported developing new asthma.

==== ALS Registry ====
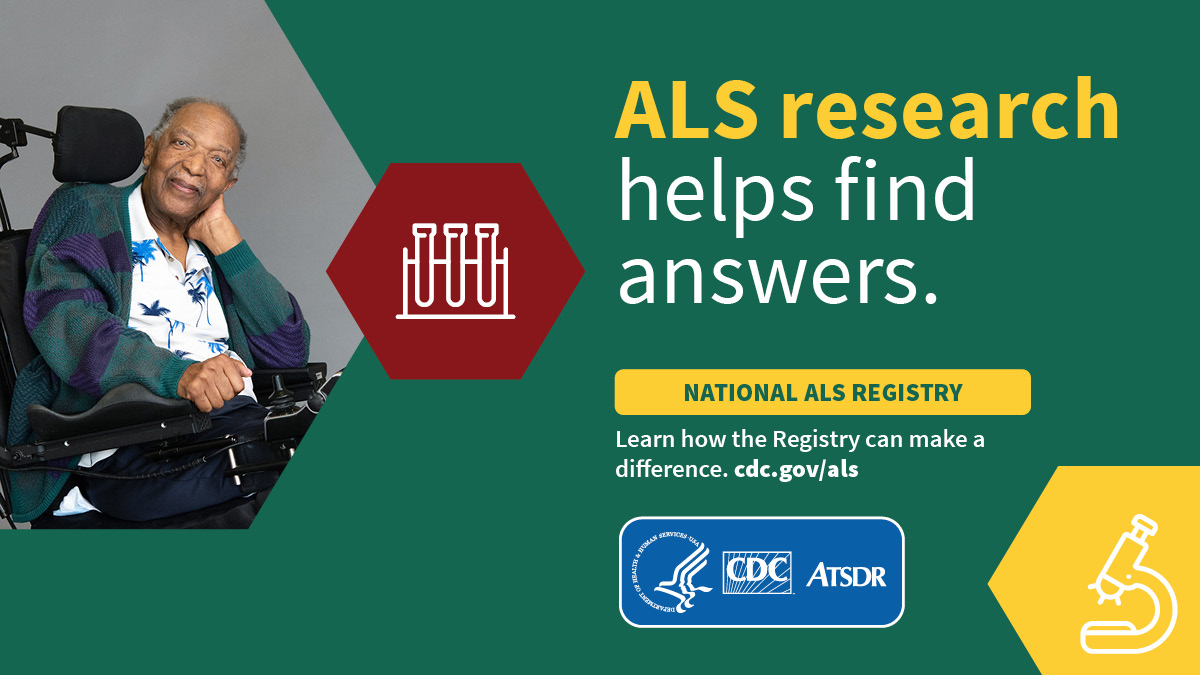
A 2021 promotional image for the ATSDR National ALS Registry

As of 2008, ATSDR is starting a new registry for people with amyotrophic lateral sclerosis (also known as ALS or Lou Gehrig's Disease). President George W. Bush signed the ALS Registry Act, which provided for establishment of the registry, on October 8, 2008. It is hoped that the registry will provide information on the prevalence of ALS and lead to a better understanding of factors that may be associated with the disease. The agency began registering people for the registry on October 20, 2010.

=== Surveillance ===
ATSDR conducts surveillance by maintaining projects to collect and analyze information on diseases and chemical exposures. Research using that information and data can then be used to prevent future and control injury, disease, and death.

==== Hazardous Substances Emergency Events Surveillance Program ====
One of the most notable surveillance projects was the Hazardous Substances Emergency Events Surveillance (HSEES) program, which lasted from 1990 to 2009. ATSDR partnered with 15 states to collect information for HSEES in order to track, report, and study chemical spills. The information in the HSEES system was used to plan for emergency events involving hazardous substances (including terrorist attacks). States also used the information to develop policies and programs to strengthen public health and reduce illnesses and deaths that can result from exposure to hazardous substances. For example, states used HSEES data to support legislation addressing the problem of hazardous chemicals at illegal methamphetamine labs. Other states used HSEES data to implement programs designed to minimize exposure to hazardous chemicals and mercury at schools. More than 50 published studies were conducted using HSEES data.

==== National Toxic Substance Incidents Program ====
As a successor to the HSEES program, ATSDR launched the National Toxic Substance Incidents Program (NTSIP) in 2009. One aspect of NTSIP is a national database of information related to chemical spills. NTSIP also has Assessment of Chemical Exposure teams to assist state and local health departments in the aftermath of toxic spills. These teams interview people who were exposed to the hazardous substances and collect samples to test the level of contamination in the environment and in people.

=== Emergency response ===
ATSDR represents the Department of Health and Human Services on the National Response Team and works with other agencies to provide technical assistance during emergencies involving hazardous substances, such as chemical spills. In July 2007, for example, ATSDR responded to the Verdigris River flood in Coffeyville, Kansas, after an oil refinery spilled crude oil into the floodwaters, contaminating many homes in the city. ATSDR worked with EPA and state and local authorities to provide health information to local residents and advised those agencies during the clean-up process. ATSDR also assists with responding to terrorism incidents, which have included the September 11 attacks and the 2001 anthrax attacks. ATSDR responded to 132 chemical emergency events in 2008.

In addition to working with communities and other agencies in the aftermath of chemical emergencies, ATSDR has developed the Managing Hazardous Materials Incidents series, which includes several tools to assist emergency medical services personnel and hospital emergency departments during chemical emergencies. This includes important information on emergency planning, emergency response, and rescuer protection. Another tool is the Medical Management Guidelines, which summarize important information on exposure to common chemicals and provide suggestions for safely treating and decontaminating patients.

=== Brownfield/land reuse initiative ===
ATSDR works closely with communities to evaluate the public health effects related to redevelopment of brownfields properties. These are sites that were formerly used for industrial purposes and may still be contaminated with hazardous substances. ATSDR has worked at more than 400 brownfield or land reuse sites to assess health effects of potential exposure to hazardous substances. The agency has created resources to provide guidance to communities when planning redevelopment projects, including tools to evaluate the potential threat of chemicals at development sites. In addition to evaluating the health effects of contamination at specific brownfield sites, ATSDR encourages communities to monitor community health. One of the agency's brownfields projects was the Menomonee Valley in Milwaukee, Wisconsin, where the agency evaluated potential health effects of contamination at the site and worked closely with developers and the city.

=== Community partnerships ===
A major focus of the work ATSDR does involves interacting with communities. ATSDR often establishes partnerships with state and local health departments to assist them with their public health duties. In 2008, ATSDR had cooperative agreements with 29 states and one tribal government, providing technical assistance to help those partners address local environmental health concerns. ATSDR also creates community assistance panels to solicit feedback and community health concerns from local residents when the agency works at sites to evaluate health effects resulting from exposure to toxic substances.

=== National Conversation on Public Health and Chemical Exposures ===
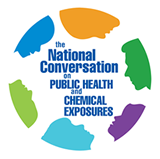

In June 2009, ATSDR and NCEH launched a joint project, the National Conversation on Public Health and Chemical Exposures. The goal of the National Conversation is to develop recommendations for ways ATSDR and other government agencies can improve their efforts to protect the public from harmful chemical exposures. To foster a productive dialogue, ATSDR encouraged broad public participation in the National Conversation and welcomed involvement from all interested stakeholders, including government agencies, public health professionals, environmental organizations, community leaders, business and industry representatives, tribal groups, and other interested citizens. The National Conversation is led by a 40-person Leadership Council that includes experts in various areas related to environmental public health. In addition, there are six work groups, which also have a diverse membership, to research and propose recommendations on certain key areas. To encourage involvement from community groups, interested citizens, and the general public, ATSDR developed a community toolkit to assist community leaders in holding discussions to solicit feedback and ideas for the National Conversation. ATSDR plans to release its final action agenda in early 2011.

== Quality of work ==
ATSDR prides itself on using "the best science." And in 2003, BBC News described ATSDR as "widely regarded as the world's leading agency on public health and the environment."

However, ATSDR has also been the focus of scrutiny from Congress and other groups. Much of the criticism is due to the fact that the agency has been overtasked yet understaffed and underfunded for much of its history.

- In August 1991, the General Accounting Office (now the Government Accountability Office) published a report that faulted the quality of ATSDR's original public health assessments and questioned their usefulness. It also placed part of the blame on the deadlines and requirements that Congress imposed with SARA: "SARA's requirement that ATSDR quickly assess 951 Superfund sites came at a time when the agency was still relatively new and ... not staffed or organized for the job." The report also noted that after meeting the SARA deadline, ATSDR was able to increase the rigor of its public health assessments.
- In May 1992, the Environmental Health Network and the National Toxics Campaign Fund published "Inconclusive by Design," a report which noted structural limitations to the work of CDC and ATSDR.
- In April 2008, the United States House of Representatives Committee on Science and Technology Subcommittee on Investigations and Oversight held a hearing on formaldehyde exposures in trailers that the Federal Emergency Management Agency (FEMA) provided as temporary housing to people displaced by Hurricane Katrina. A report based on the hearing, issued by the subcommittee's Democratic majority staff in September 2008, noted shortcomings in the agency's original health consultation that examined the health risks of formaldehyde in the FEMA trailers.
- In March 2009, the Democratic majority staff of the Subcommittee on Investigations and Oversight issued another report on ATSDR, which called for leadership changes within the agency. The report stated: "Time and time again ATSDR appears to avoid clearly and directly confronting the most obvious toxic culprits that harm the health of local communities throughout the nation. Instead, they deny, delay, minimize, trivialize or ignore legitimate concerns and health considerations of local communities and well respected scientists and medical professionals."

In the March 12, 2009, congressional hearing, the subcommittee chairman, Congressman Brad Miller, characterized ATSDR as keen to "please industries and government agencies" and referred to ATSDR's reports as "jackleg assessments saying 'not to worry.'" In defense of ATSDR's work, director Howard Frumkin noted that ATSDR's staff has declined from 500 to about 300, and that often communities expect "definitive answers about the links between exposures and illnesses," but expectations can be unmet due to scientific uncertainty. However, Frumkin also acknowledged the possibility that some assessments did not use the best data or monitoring techniques.

=== Vieques, Puerto Rico ===
In 2003, ATSDR released public health assessments that evaluated the potential health effects of pollution left behind by the United States Navy in Vieques, Puerto Rico. The public health assessments noted that residents of the island were exposed to environmental contamination at such low levels that no harmful health effects were expected, and the agency concluded that there was "no apparent public health hazard." In 2009, however, ATSDR announced that it had identified gaps in environmental data and planned to take a "fresh look" at Vieques by reviewing studies on the island.

=== West Lake Landfill, Missouri ===
In 2015, ATSDR released a report, based on EPA data, declaring no health risk to communities near West Lake Landfill. The agency's assessment contradicted findings from scientific investigations initiated by the Missouri attorney general and affected residents, who started organizing in 2012 when an underground fire in the landfill raised awareness of radioactive material and high rates of childhood cancer. Republic Services, one of the parties responsible for the landfill, has cited the report to argue against the removal of toxic waste.

== See also ==
- List of Superfund sites in the United States
- National Priorities List
- TOXMAP
- United States Department of Health and Human Services
- United States Navy in Vieques, Puerto Rico
