= Roosevelt Roads Naval Station =

US Navy base in Ceiba, Puerto Rico

- Ceiba in Puerto Rico, United States
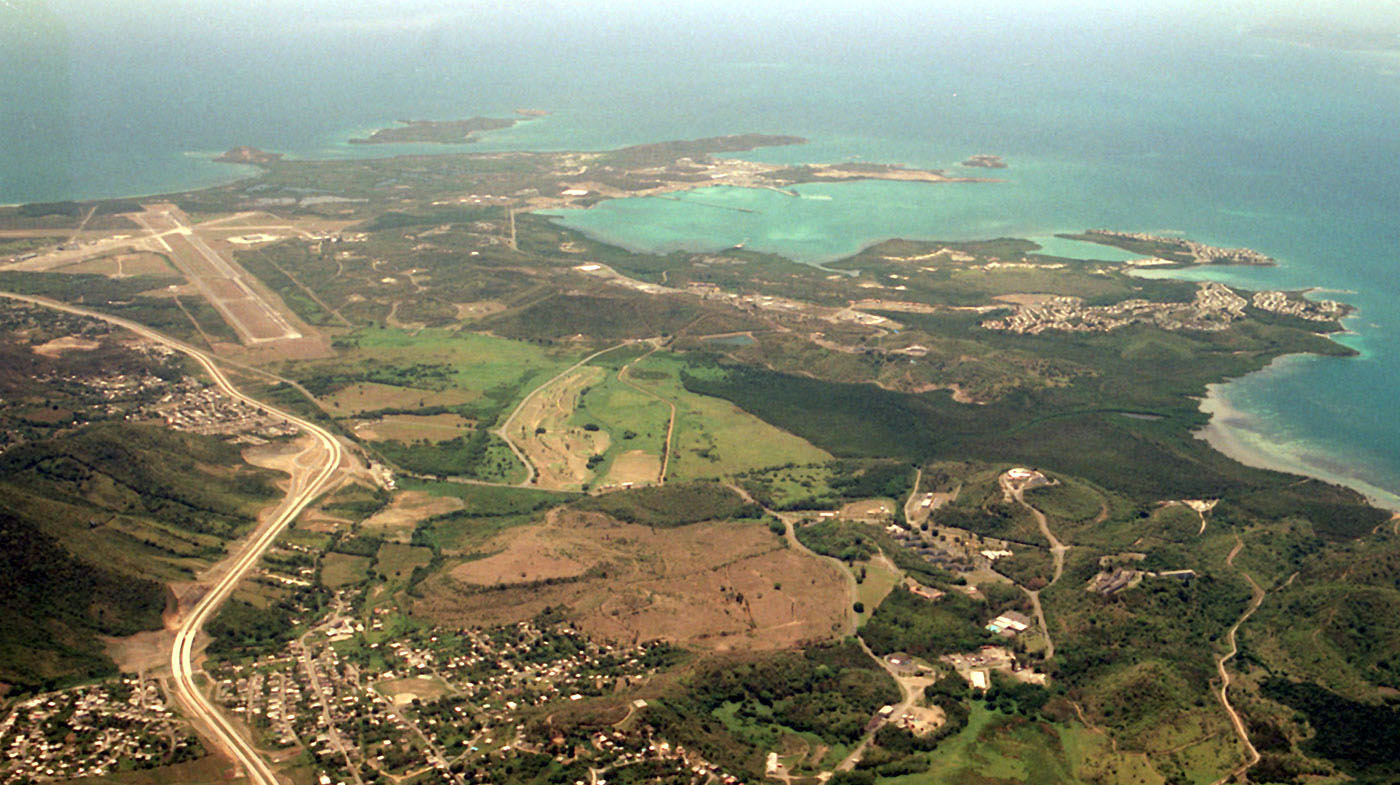
- Aerial view (1997)

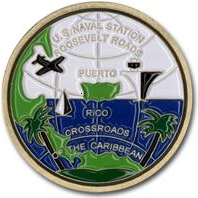

Site information
- Owner: United States Navy

Location
- Location in Puerto Rico
- Coordinates: 18°14′17″N 65°37′40″W

Site history
- Built: 1943
- In use: 1943–2004, 2025–present

Airfield information
- Identifiers: IATA: NRR, ICAO: TJNR, FAA LID: NRR
- Elevation: 38 feet (12 m) AMSL
Runways
| Direction | Length and surface |
|---|---|
| 07/25 | 11,000 feet (3,353 m) Concrete |
| 18/36 | 5,800 feet (1,768 m) Concrete |

Roosevelt Roads Naval Station, or simply Roosevelt Roads (nicknamed Rosy Roads), is an active United States Navy base in the town of Ceiba, Puerto Rico. The Roosevelt Roads Naval Station includes José Aponte de la Torre Airport, a public use airport. After a period of inactivity lasting around 20 years, operations resumed on November 14, 2025.

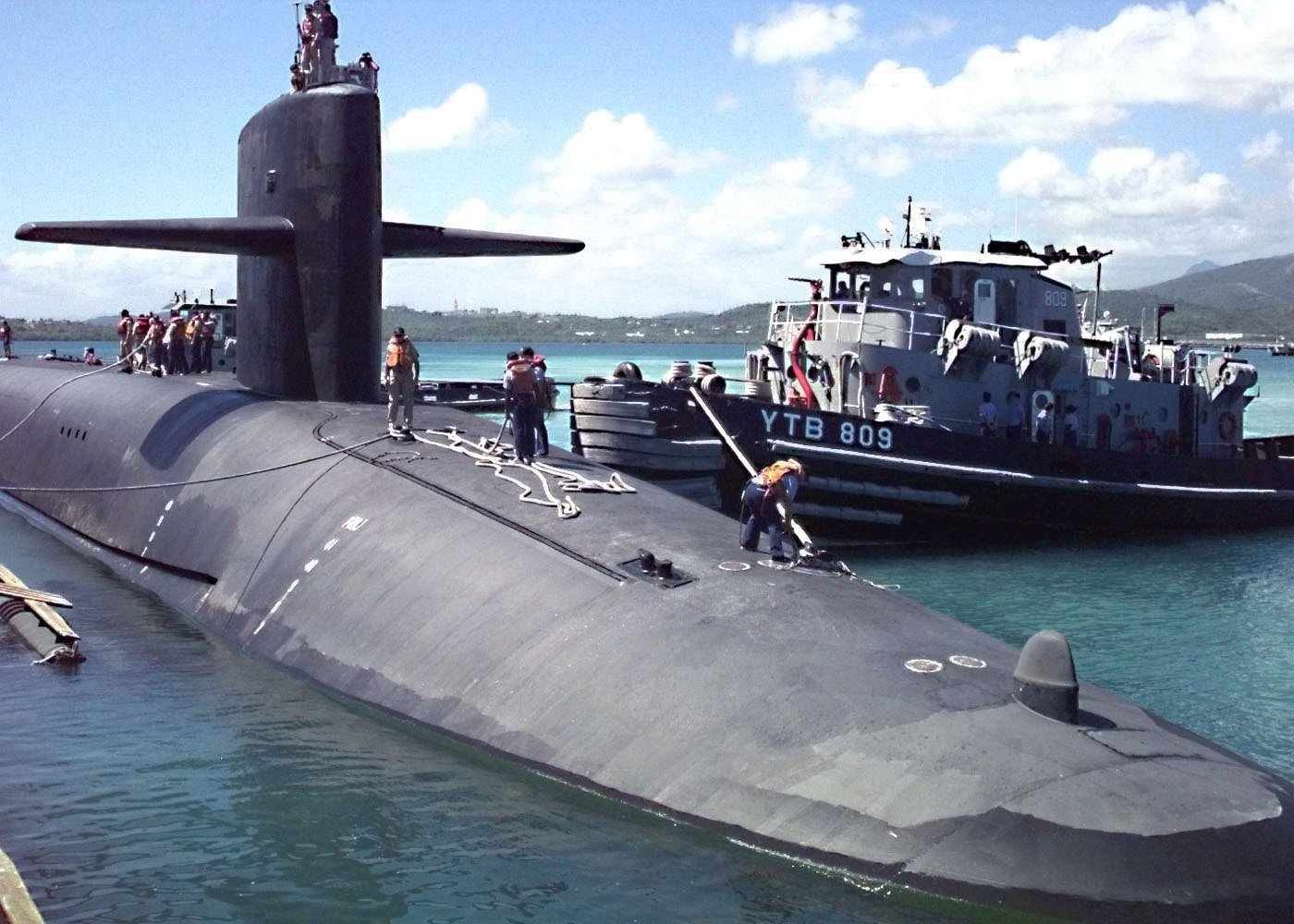
USS Maryland (SSBN-738), an Ohio-class ballistic missile submarine at Roosevelt Roads Naval Station, pictured October 27, 1997

== History ==
In 1919, future US president Franklin D. Roosevelt, then assistant secretary of the Navy, toured Puerto Rico, visiting Ceiba. When he returned to the White House, he expressed a liking for the terrain where the base was to be located. This was during the World War I-era, and the US could benefit from an airfield in Ceiba. While Puerto Rico is a Commonwealth, its territorial rights belong to the US, which made it feasible for the US government to build an air base in Ceiba.

When Nazi Germany began to invade other European countries, President Roosevelt considered the idea of a naval air station in Ceiba. With war in the European and Pacific theatres, they saw an airbase in the Caribbean as necessary. President Roosevelt ordered the creation of the base in 1940.

In 1941, US$50 million, equivalent to $820 million in 2025, was appropriated to develop a protected anchorage in the sea area between Puerto Rico and Vieques, an area named Roosevelt Roads by Navy secretary Frank Knox on 15 May 1941. On 22 August 1941, President Roosevelt authorized another $21.97 million, equivalent to $481 million in 2025, for a protected fleet anchorage at Roosevelt Roads.

In 1957, it was upgraded to Naval Station status. Fort Bundy was located there, but it crossed over to parts of Vieques, a fact that became important in the future. A US military mission, the M3, was located there. It was part of the "Naval Computer and Telecommunications Station, Puerto Rico Base Communication Department". M3 had a fleet center, a technical control facility and a Tactical support communications department. The M3 was designated to help Puerto Rico, the US and other Caribbean and Latin American countries to deal with drug trafficking, illegal immigration and other problems. The main purpose of the base was tactical support for land/sea/air maneuvers at the Naval Training Range in Vieques.

In 1969, the US Navy established Camp Moscrip which held a rotating US Navy Construction Battalion (Seabee). Having a permanently stationed Seabee unit's personnel and heavy equipment already on the island meant they could begin clearing debris and restoring infrastructure within hours of a storm, as evidenced by their efforts clearing roads and restoring power immediately after Hurricane Georges in September 1998.

Within the industrial area, the drydock, a bombproof power plant, a sewage pumping station, and a machine shop were completed. The drydock, 1,100 by 155 feet (335 by 47 m), and built in the dry, was first used in July 1943. The power plant, a bombproof structure with 4-foot (1.2 m)-thick concrete walls, was equipped with two 5,000-kw steam-driven generators. The Bolles Drydock was dedicated in February 1944, in memory of Captain Harry A. Bolles, (CEC) USN, who was killed in Alaska in World War II.

In January 2003, Admiral Robert J. Natter said that, with the upcoming closure of the Naval Training Range in Vieques, Roosevelt Roads was no longer needed by the Navy. Later that year, a military appropriations bill required the Secretary of the Navy to close the facility within six months of the enactment of the act. The base closed on 31 March 2004. At the time, there were nearly 1,200 active-duty officers and sailors at Roosevelt Roads.

The United States Special Operations Command South moved from Roosevelt Roads to Homestead Air Reserve Base in Miami–Dade County, Florida. U.S. Naval Forces Southern Command moved from Roosevelt Roads to Mayport Naval Station near Jacksonville, Florida. Naval Mobile Construction Battalion (NMCB) 74 (Seabee) moved from Roosevelt Roads to Little Creek, Virginia.

After Roosevelt Roads closed, the only U.S. naval base in the Caribbean was Guantanamo Bay Naval Base. From the time that Congress voted to close the base until its closure, Roosevelt Roads closed faster than any other military installation on US soil in several decades. After its closure, 200 sailors and civilians remained to help in the transition from a naval base to a naval agency coordinating the closing process.

The closure of the base heavily impacted the local economy, and lead to the loss of employment for over 1,000 local contractors and $300 million in annual direct disbursements.

Of the former base's property, about 30% was transferred to the government of Puerto Rico and its municipalities. 40% became a wetlands preserve, and the remainder was offered for sale at public auction.

In October 2025, photos show that Naval Station Roosevelt Roads has been reactivated. Satellite images and on-site photos reveal aircraft and personnel operating from the base, including at least one USAF AC-130J "Ghostrider" gunship equipped with Hellfire missiles parked at José Aponte de la Torre Airport, which serves the installation.

== Further developments ==
In January 2009, approximately 2,900 acres (12 km^{2}) of the former Naval Station was being marketed to the public by the Los Angeles group of Colliers International, on behalf of the Navy's Base Realignment and Closure Program Management Office, as a public auction to commence in the near future. The remaining portion of the base was conveyed to the Commonwealth of Puerto Rico and other Federal agencies in stages. Since November 2008, the Puerto Rico Ports Authority has operated the José Aponte de la Torre Airport.

In 2012, the former Roosevelt Roads Naval Station was under consideration as a possible location for the SpaceX private launch site, but was not selected.

In October 2018, Ricardo Rosselló's administration made it the launching port to Vieques and Culebra

In mid-March 2020, José Aponte Hernández, a former Speaker of the House of Representatives of Puerto Rico, said he would request from Jenniffer González Colón, (the resident commissioner of Puerto Rico), for funds to restore a former hospital to operational status. What was discussed was the possibility of using the former hospital located on the Roosevelt Roads Naval Station to treat persons affected by the COVID-19 pandemic in Puerto Rico.

== Later military and U.S. government activities ==
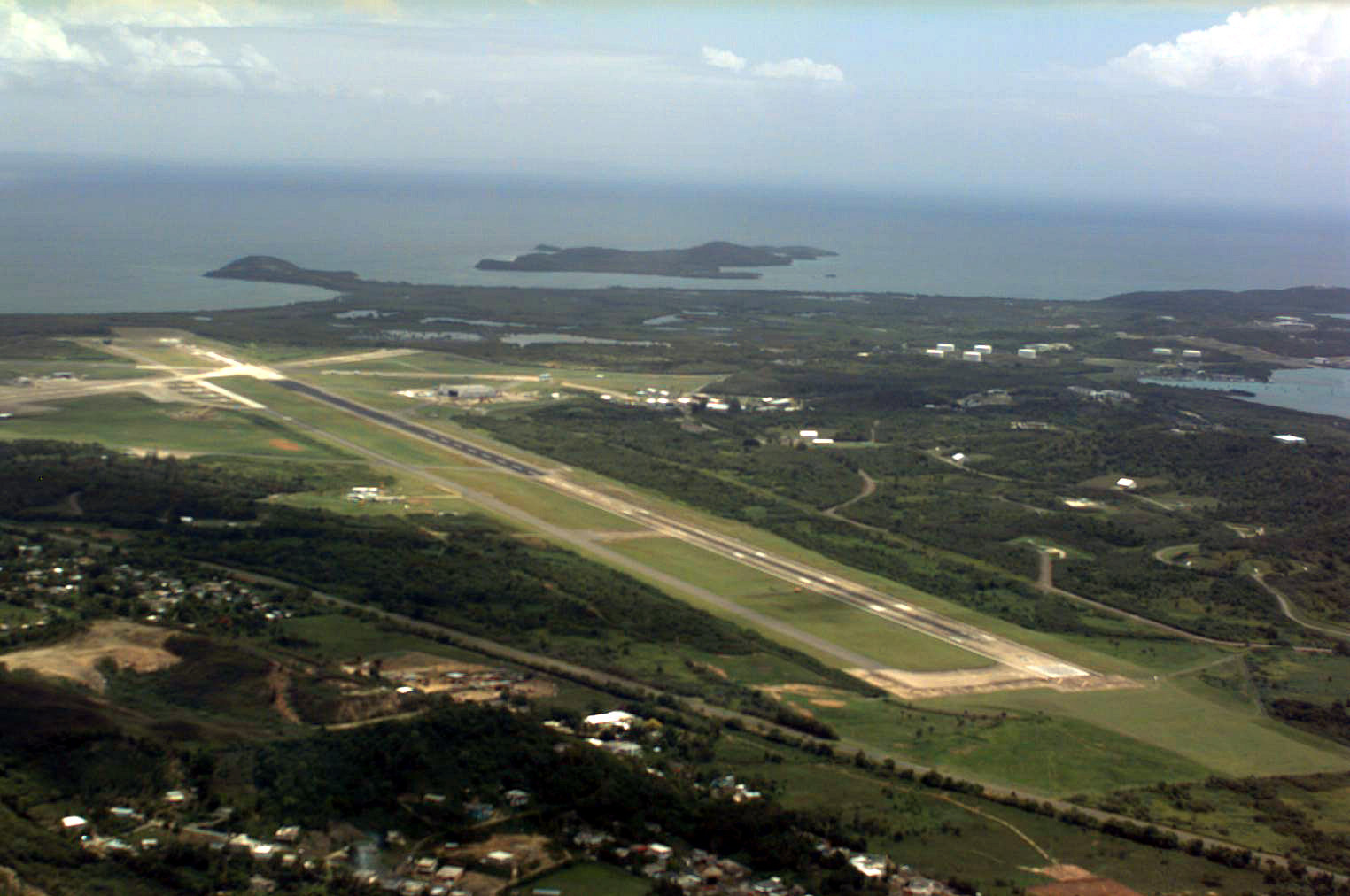
Aerial view of Naval Station, Roosevelt Roads

In September 2009, the Navy transferred Areas 55 and 63, approximately 53.77 acres (21.76 ha) of land, to US Army Garrison (USAG) Fort Buchanan for the Reserve Component of the United States Army, which includes the existing Roosevelt Roads US Army Reserve Center and the Ceiba Armed Forces Reserve Center (AFRC). In November 2012, the US Army transferred the property from USAG Fort Buchanan to the US Army Reserve 81st Readiness Division.

The U.S. Army Reserve Boat Maintenance Facility located at Ensenada Honda bay was transferred to the Puerto Rico National Guard Landing Craft Detachment, 191st Regional Support Group.

In 2017, a joint Army National Guard and Marine expeditionary unit (MEU) team established an Installation Staging Base at the former Naval Station is support of Hurricane Maria rescue and relief efforts. They transported Department of Health and Human Services assessment teams via helicopter to hospitals across Puerto Rico. The United States Air Force 821st Contingency Response Support Squadron, 821st Contingency Response Group, the United States Army 1st Armored Division Aviation Brigade and the 101st Airborne Division "Dustoff" unit arrived at Roosevelt Roads to support relief efforts. Marines and sailors set up a supply staging base receiving around-the-clock airlifts at Roosevelt Roads. This was the first major military activity at Roosevelt Roads since 2004.

In August 2018, the U.S. Customs and Border Protection Air and Marine Operations began marine operations at a new facility at the former Roosevelt Roads Naval Station.

In October 2025, CNN reported that base is again being used by the U.S. military as a staging ground for U.S. military activities in the Caribbean. In October 2025, Secretary of Defense Pete Hegseth did not directly respond to questions regarding the reopening of the facility.

In September 2025, Puerto Rican senators Nitza Morán Trinidad and Carmelo Ríos Santiago introduced Senate Resolution 286 "to evaluate the feasibility and impact of potentially repurposing Roosevelt Roads for national security by the Army" citing both regional security and the base's historical contribution to the local economy in terms of employment and revenues.

== Potential vertical launch site ==
In December 2024, the local redevelopment authority issued a request for proposal for a vertical space launch site at Roosevelt Roads Naval Station.

== Reactivation (2025–present) ==
After being closed since 2004, Roosevelt Roads Naval Station was officially reactivated in November 2025. The reactivation included clearing, environmental remediation, renovation and restoration of existing taxiways and other airfield infrastructure. According to reports from Reuters and Le Monde, the site is once again being used as a strategic hub for U.S. military operations in the Caribbean, amid growing tensions with Venezuela. Satellite imagery and eyewitness accounts have indicated the presence of F-35 Lightning II aircraft at the base in late 2025. While U.S. officials describe the project as part of regional logistics and counter-narcotics operations, analysts suggest it also reflects broader geopolitical interests tied to the situation in Venezuela.

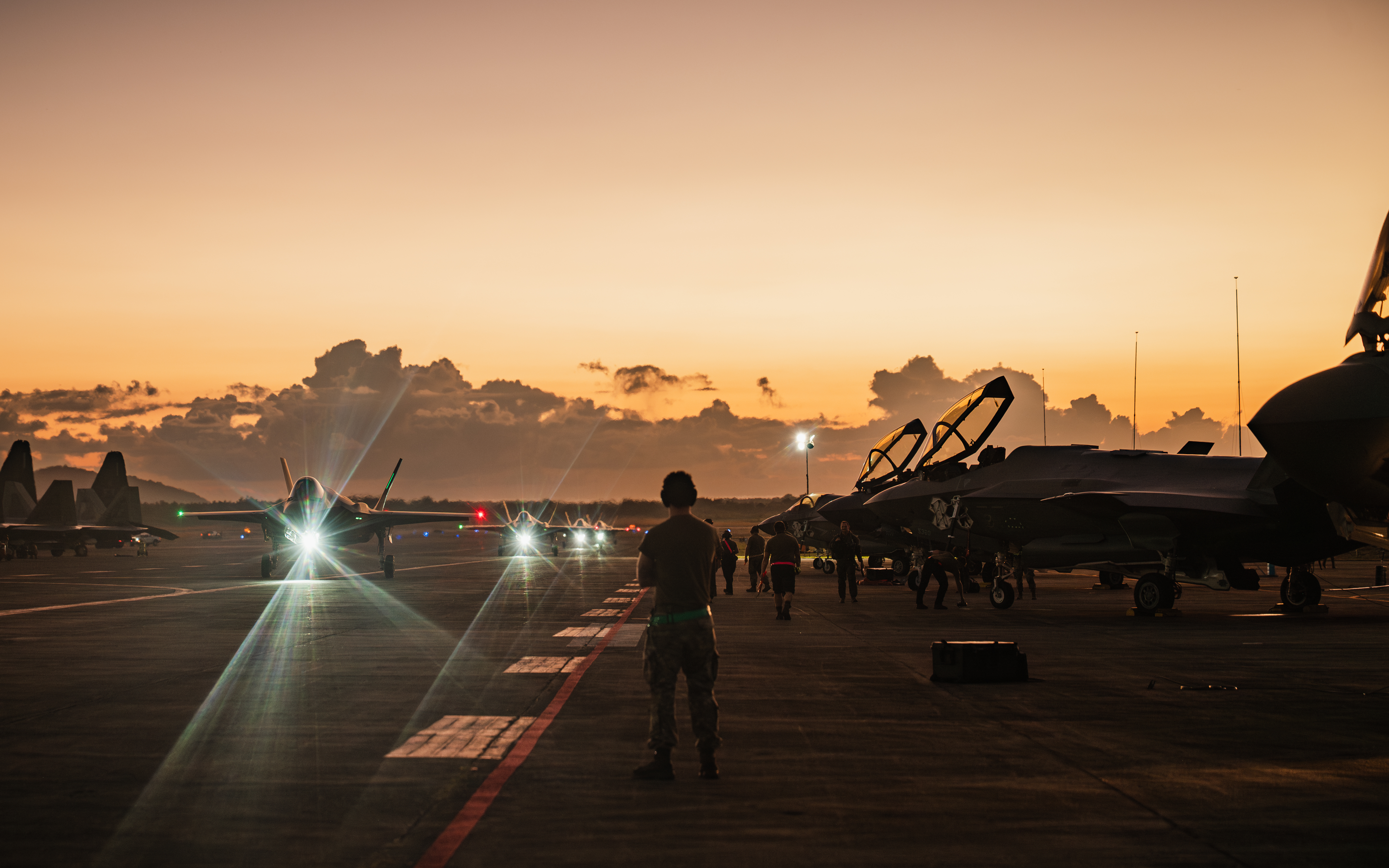
F-35A jets at Roosevelt Roads Naval Station following the Operation Absolute Resolve

As of November 14, 2025, the Roosevelt Roads Naval Base officially returned to operation, as the United States military, under orders from President Donald Trump, continued to build up its ready forces in the Caribbean ahead of the 2026 United States strikes in Venezuela. On December 9, 2025, the 158th Air Wing of the Vermont Air National Guard was ordered to Roosevelt Roads to support up to 20 USAF F-35 Lightning II fighters.

== See also ==
- Military history of Puerto Rico

== Gallery ==
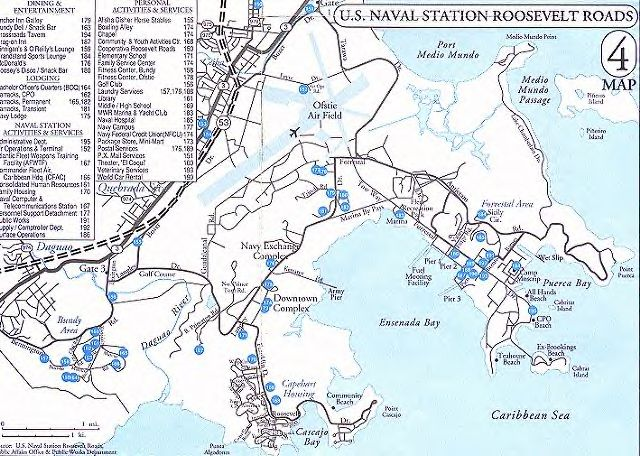
A map of Roosevelt Roads

A 1945 map of Naval Station and Auxiliary Air Facility, Roosevelt Roads
