= Robert J. Natter =

American military officer

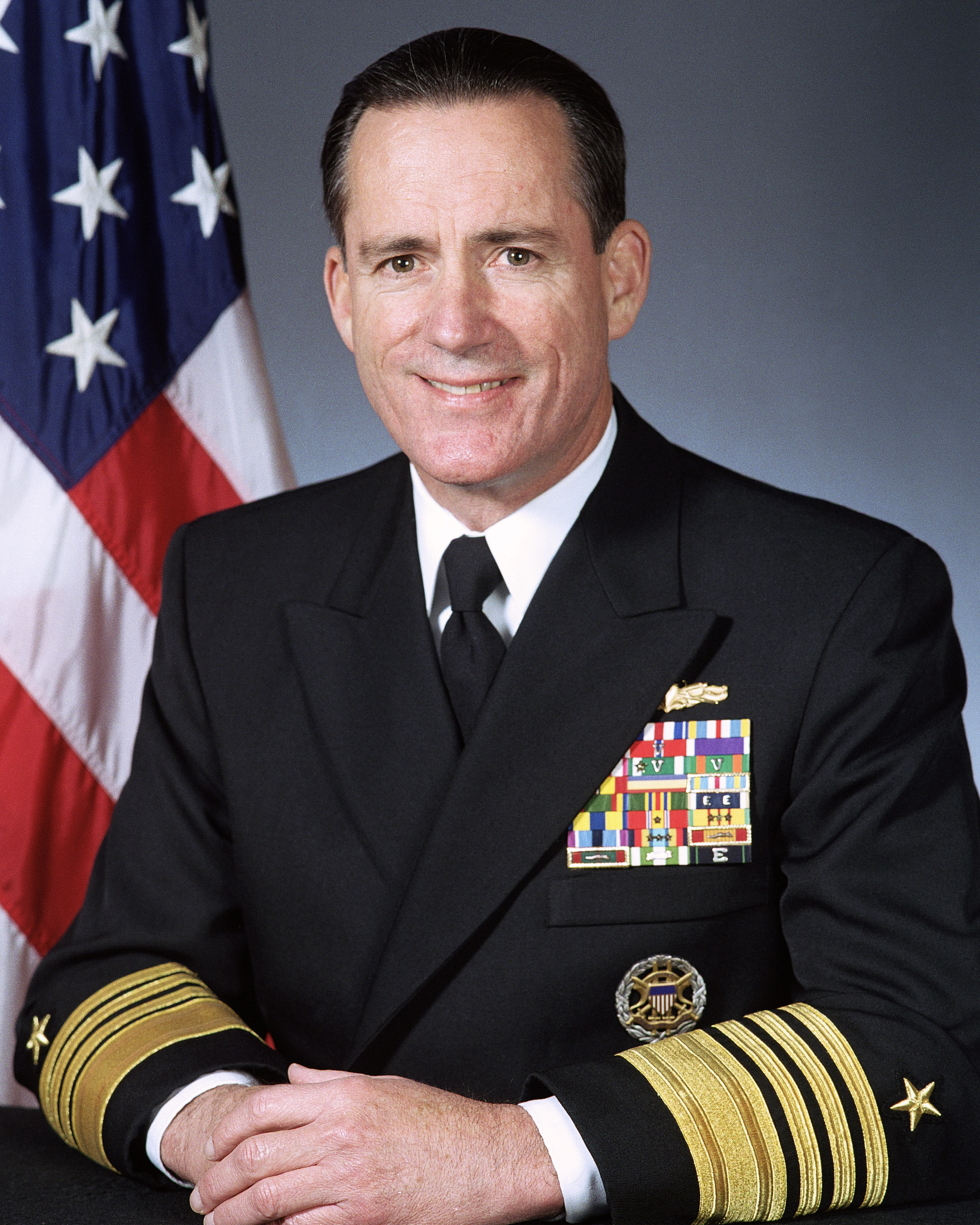
- Admiral Robert J. Natter
- Born: April 9, 1945 (age 81); Trussville, Alabama, U.S.
- Military career
- Allegiance: United States of America
- Branch: United States Navy
- Service years: 1962-1963 / 1967-2003
- Rank: Admiral
- Commands: Atlantic Fleet/Fleet Forces Command; Seventh Fleet; USS Antietam; USS Chandler
- Conflicts: Vietnam War
- Awards: Navy Distinguished Service Medal (5); Silver Star; Defense Superior Service Medal; Legion of Merit (5); Bronze Star (for Valor); Purple Heart
- Other work: Board of Directors, United Defense Industries

Admiral Robert Joseph Natter is a retired United States Navy admiral who served as Commander, U.S. Atlantic Fleet/Fleet Forces Command from 2000 to 2003.

== Military career ==
Natter was born April 9, 1945, at his home in Trussville, Alabama. He enlisted in the United States Naval Reserve at the age of 17 as a Seaman Recruit. After one year of enlisted service he was appointed to the United States Naval Academy, and graduated in 1967, receiving a commission as an Ensign.

Natter's service at sea included department head tours in a Coastal Minesweeper and Frigate, and Executive Officer tours in two Amphibious Tank Landing Ships and a Spruance Destroyer USS Hewitt. He was Officer-in-Charge of a Naval Special Warfare detachment in Vietnam and commanded the USS Chandler, USS Antietam and the United States Seventh Fleet.

Shore assignments included Company Officer and later Flag Secretary to the Superintendent at the United States Naval Academy; Executive Assistant to the Director of Naval Warfare in the Office of the Chief of Naval Operations (OPNAV); staff member for the House Armed Services Committee of the 100th Congress of the United States; Executive Assistant to the Commander in Chief, U.S. Pacific Fleet; Executive Assistant to the Vice Chairman, Joint Chiefs of Staff, during Operation Desert Storm; Assistant Chief of Naval Personnel for officer and enlisted personnel assignments; Chief on the Navy's Legislative Affairs organization; Director for Space, Information Warfare, Command and Control (OPNAV N6); and the Deputy Chief of Naval Operations for Plans, Policy and Operations (OPNAV N3/N5).

Natter was a distinguished graduate of the U.S. Naval War College and has master's degrees in both Business Management and International Relations. In May 2000, he was awarded the Naval War College Distinguished Graduate Leadership Award.

== Awards and honors ==
Navy Surface Warfare Officer Pin
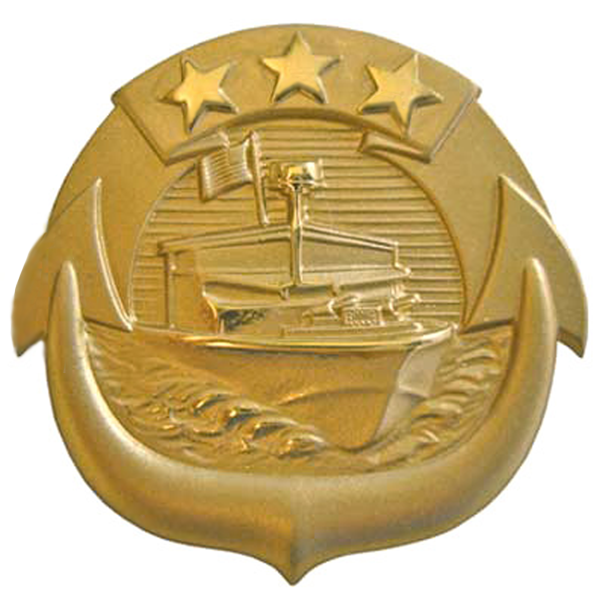
Small Craft insignia Officer-in-charge
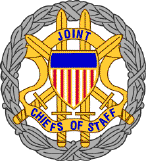
Joint Chiefs of Staff ID Badge

Navy Distinguished Service Medal with four gold award stars
Silver Star
Defense Superior Service Medal
Legion of Merit with four award stars
Bronze Star with Combat V
Purple Heart
Meritorious Service Medal with award star
Navy Commendation Medal with Combat V and award star
Navy Achievement Medal with Combat V
Combat Action Ribbon
Navy and Marine Corps Presidential Unit Citation
Joint Meritorious Unit Award
Navy Unit Commendation
Navy Meritorious Unit Commendation
Navy "E" Ribbon with two Battle E awards
Navy Expeditionary Medal
National Defense Service Medal with one bronze service star
Vietnam Service Medal with seven service stars
Humanitarian Service Medal
Navy Sea Service Deployment Ribbon with three service stars
Vietnam Gallantry Cross Unit Citation
Vietnam Civil Actions Medal Unit Citation
Vietnam Campaign Medal
Navy Expert Pistol Shot Medal

Other honors include in 1998 the Order of the Rising Sun from the Emperor of Japan, the 1998 Order of National Security Merit from the Republic of Korea, the 2003 Ellis Island Medal of Honor, the 2003 Ted Williams Military Achievement Award, and the 2004 Naval Order of the United States Distinguished Sea Service Award.

He retired from the Navy in 2003.

== Post military ==
Natter joined the board of directors of United Defense Industries in 2004. He is also President of R.J. Natter & Associates, LLC, a consulting firm; serves on the McDonald's Corporation Advisory Board; and is a Non-Executive Director of Novonix Limited which develops, manufactures and sells the worlds most accurate high precision battery cell testing equipment and graphite materials for the lithium-ion battery (LIB) industry; served as Chairman of the United States Naval Academy's Distinguished Graduate Selection Committee; and in May, 2012 became Chairman, Naval Academy Alumni Association's national Board of Trustees. He was one of the Naval Academy's 2019 Distinguished Graduate selections.
