= Casa Delerme-Anduze No. 2 =

Historic house in Vieques, Puerto Rico

- U.S. National Register of Historic Places
- Puerto Rico Historic Sites and Zones
- Location within Puerto Rico
- Location: 355 Antonio Mellado Street Isabel Segunda, Vieques, Puerto Rico
- Coordinates: 18°08′55″N 65°26′29″W
- Built: 1876
- Architectural style: Spanish Creole Vernacular
- NRHP reference No.: 93001205
- RNSZH No.: 2000-(RE)-18-JP-SH

Significant dates
- Added to NRHP: November 22, 1993
- Designated RNSZH: May 16, 2001

The second Delerme-Anduze House (Spanish: Casa Delerme-Anduze número dos), also known as the Rosendo Delerme House at 355 Antonio Mellado Street (Casa Rosendo Delerme en la Calle Antonio Mellado #355), is a historic 19th-century Spanish Creole-style house located in Isabel Segunda, the largest and main administrative and historic settlement of the island-municipality of Vieques, Puerto Rico. Local historical accounts such as "The Immigrations to Vieques, 1823-1898", describe the residence as the second house in Vieques to be owned by Augusto Neré Delerme, a wealthy French immigrant from Guadeloupe who built it in 1876 as a wedding gift for his wife Cecilia Anduze, a native of Saint Thomas. The house was lived by their son Julio Delerme-Anduze and afterwards by his descendants. The residence was added to the National Register of Historic Places and the Puerto Rico Register of Historic Sites and Zones for its architectural and historical significance as it represents a prime example of Spanish vernacular architecture with elements of the French Creole architecture from the West Indies that was popular in Vieques at the time.

== See also ==
- French immigration to Puerto Rico
- National Register of Historic Places listings in eastern Puerto Rico
  - Casa Augusto Delerme
  - Delerme-Anduze House
