= Delerme-Anduze House =

Historic house in Vieques, Puerto Rico

- Delerme--Anduze House
- U.S. National Register of Historic Places
- Puerto Rico Historic Sites and Zones
- Location within Puerto Rico
- Location: 361 Antonio Mellado Street 355 Antonio Mellado Street Isabel Segunda, Vieques, Puerto Rico
- Coordinates: 18°08′50″N 65°26′29″W
- Built: 1850
- Architectural style: Vernacular architecture
- NRHP reference No.: 93001556
- RNSZH No.: 2000-(RE)-18-JP-SH

Significant dates
- Added to NRHP: February 2, 1994
- Designated RNSZH: May 16, 2001

The Delerme-Anduze House (Spanish: Casa Delerme-Anduze), also known as the Rosendo Delerme House (Casa Rosendo Delerme), is a historic Spanish Creole vernacular house located in Isabel Segunda, the largest and main administrative and historic settlement of the island-municipality of Vieques, Puerto Rico. The house was built following the gallery-type French Caribbean vernacular tradition (known as Louisiana-style in the United States) during the 1850s by Augusto Neré Delerme, a wealthy French immigrant from Guadeloupe. He was also the owner of another historic house located nearby. It was added to the National Register of Historic Places in 1994 as it is described as the finest example of French Creole house in Vieques and one of the few of its type remaining anywhere in the United States.

== See also ==
- National Register of Historic Places listings in eastern Puerto Rico
  - Casa Delerme-Anduze No. 2
