= Casa de Jaime Puig Lemoine =

Historic house in Vieques, Puerto Rico

- U.S. National Register of Historic Places
- Puerto Rico Historic Sites and Zones
- Location within Puerto Rico
- Location: 161 65 de Infantería Street Isabel Segunda, Vieques, Puerto Rico
- Coordinates: 18°08′55″N 65°26′35″W
- Built: 1930
- Architect: Jaime Puig Lemoine
- Architectural style: Bungalow/Craftsman
- NRHP reference No.: 94000363
- RNSZH No.: 2000-(RE)-18-JP-SH

Significant dates
- Added to NRHP: April 14, 1994
- Designated RNSZH: May 16, 2001

The Jaime Puig Lemoine Residence (Spanish: Casa de Jaime Puig Lemoine), also known as the Carmen Puig Residence (Casa de Carmen Puig), is a historic Bungalow/Craftsman-style house located in the town of Isabel Segunda, the largest settlement in the Puerto Rican island-municipality of Vieques. It was built in 1930 by Catalan and French-Puerto Rican architect Jaime Puig Lemoine in the American Craftsman style, an architectural style that was successfully imported from the United States to Puerto Rico during the first half of the 20th century. It also incorporates elements of Modernism and the local Spanish Creole vernacular architectures. It was added to the National Register of Historic Places in 1994, and to the Puerto Rico Register of Historic Sites and Zones in 2001.

== See also ==
- National Register of Historic Places listings in eastern Puerto Rico
