= Smaine–Ortiz House =

Historic house in Vieques, Puerto Rico

- U.S. National Register of Historic Places
- Puerto Rico Historic Sites and Zones
- Location within Puerto Rico
- Location: 341 Antonio Mellado Street Isabel Segunda, Vieques, Puerto Rico
- Coordinates: 18°08′49″N 65°26′29″W
- Built: 1898
- Architect: José MacPhaline
- Architectural style: Creole Vernacular
- NRHP reference No.: 93001554
- RNSZH No.: 2000-(RE)-18-JP-SH

Significant dates
- Added to NRHP: February 2, 1994
- Designated RNSZH: May 16, 2001

The Smaine–Ortiz House (Spanish: Casa Smaine-Ortiz), also known as the Porfirio Ortiz House (Casa Porfirio Ortiz), is a historic residence located in Isabel Segunda, the main settlement and administrative center of the island-municipality of Vieques, Puerto Rico. The house is an L-shaped mixed-construction vernacular residential building notable for its ornamented Miami-typed windows and raised gallery balcony. It was built in 1898 by Augustin Smaine, an immigrant from the British West Indies, with later modifications made by its second owner, Don Carlos Ortiz who was a wealthy sugarcane plantation owner during the 19th century. The house was added to the National Register of Historic Places in 1994, and to the Puerto Rico Register of Historic Sites and Zones in 2001.

== See also ==
- National Register of Historic Places listings in eastern Puerto Rico
