= Isabel II barrio-pueblo =

Historical and administrative center (seat) of Vieques, Puerto Rico

Isabel II barrio-pueblo Isabel II Isabel Segunda
- Municipality Seat
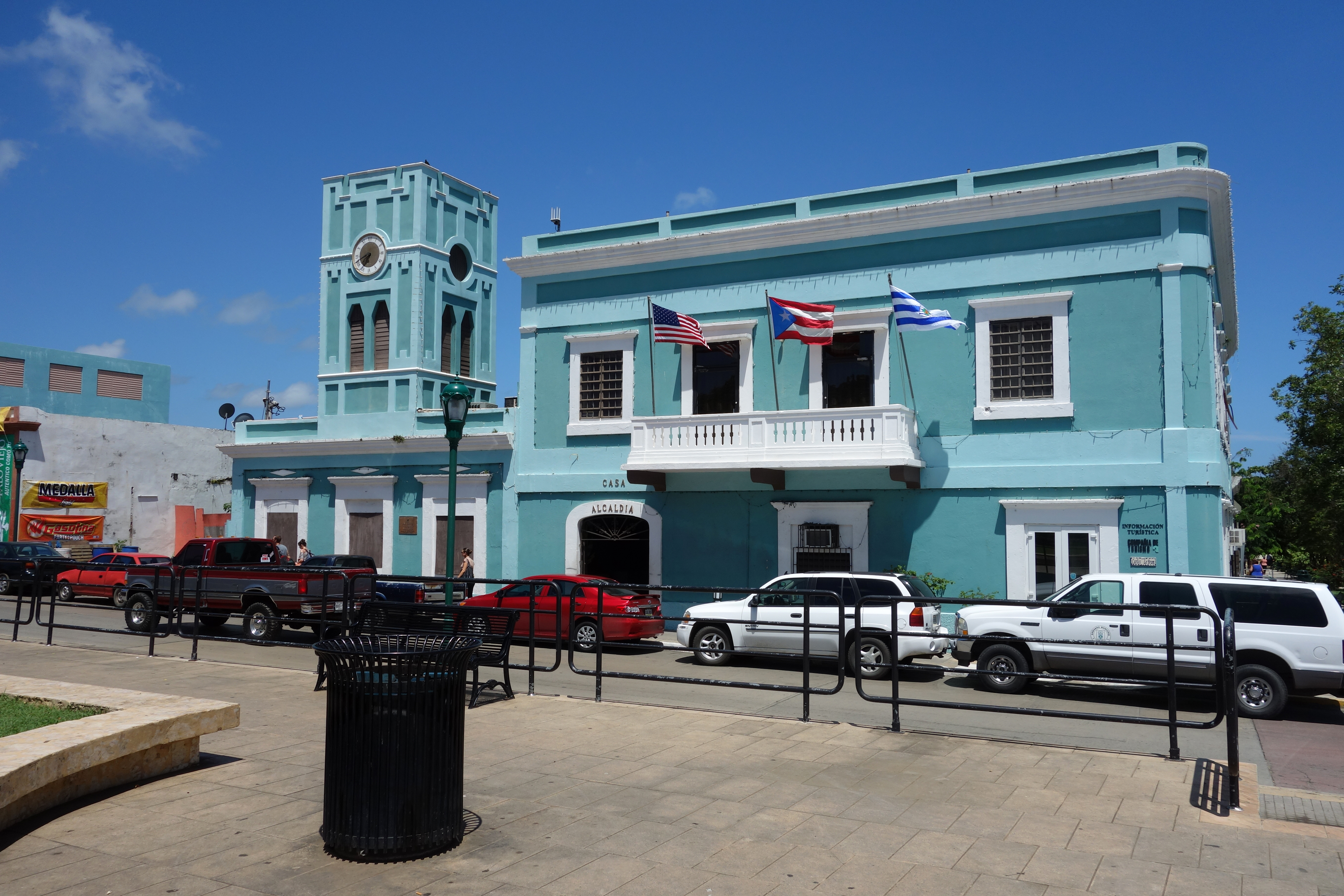
- Town Hall in Isabel II

- Location within Puerto Rico
- Coordinates: 18°08′51″N 65°26′33″W
- Commonwealth: Puerto Rico
- Municipality: Vieques

Area
  - Total: 0.50 sq mi (1.3 km^{2})
  - Land: 0.36 sq mi (0.93 km^{2})
  - Water: 0.14 sq mi (0.36 km^{2})
- Elevation: 66 ft (20 m)

Population (2010)
  - Total: 1,207
  - Density: 3,352.8/sq mi (1,294.5/km^{2})
- Source: 2010 Census
- Time zone: UTC−4 (AST)

Isabel II barrio-pueblo (referred to as Isabel Segunda in Spanish) is a barrio and the administrative center (seat) in the downtown area in the island-municipality of Vieques, Puerto Rico. Its population in 2010 was 1,354.

Historical population
Census	Pop.	Note	%±
1910	3,158		—
1920	3,424		8.4%
1930	3,101		−9.4%
1940	2,678		−13.6%
1950	3,085		15.2%
1960	2,487		−19.4%
1970	2,378		−4.4%
1980	1,807		−24.0%
1990	1,702		−5.8%
2000	1,459		−14.3%
2010	1,207		−17.3%
U.S. Decennial Census; 1900 (N/A) 1910-1930; 1930-1950 1980-2000 2010

== The central plaza and its church ==
As was customary in Spain, in Puerto Rico, the municipality has a barrio which contains a central plaza, the municipal buildings (city hall), and a Catholic church. Fiestas patronales (patron saint festivals) are held in the central plaza every year.

The central plaza, or square, is a place for official and unofficial recreational events and a place where people can gather and socialize from dusk to dawn. The Laws of the Indies, Spanish law, which regulated life in Puerto Rico in the early 19th century, stated the plaza's purpose was for "the parties" (celebrations, festivities) (Spanish: a propósito para las fiestas), and that the square should be proportionally large enough for the number of neighbors (Spanish: grandeza proporcionada al número de vecinos). These Spanish regulations also stated that the streets nearby should be comfortable portals for passersby, protecting them from the elements: sun and rain.

Located across the central plaza in Isabel II barrio-pueblo is the Parroquia Inmaculada Concepción, a Roman Catholic church, which was first built in 1844.

== History ==
Isabel II was in Spain's gazetteers until Puerto Rico was ceded by Spain in the aftermath of the Spanish–American War under the terms of the Treaty of Paris of 1898 and became an unincorporated territory of the United States. In 1899, the United States Department of War conducted a census of Puerto Rico finding that the combined population of Pueblo and Florida barrios was 2,646.

In July 2020, Federal Emergency Management Agency appropriated funds for repairs to Vieques' plaza.

== Sectors ==
Barrios (which are, in contemporary times, roughly comparable to minor civil divisions) in turn are further subdivided into smaller local populated place areas/units called sectores (sectors in English). The types of sectores may vary, from normally sector to urbanización to reparto to barriada to residencial, among others.

The following sectors are in Isabel II barrio-pueblo:

Barriada Fuerte, Calle Antonio G. Mellado, Calle Baldorioty de Castro, Calle Benítez Castaño, Calle Carlos Lebrum, Calle Muñoz Rivera, Calle Plinio Peterson, Calle Prudencio Quiñones, Calle Tomás Pérez Brignoni, Calle Víctor Duteill, Calle 65 de Infantería, Condominio Terra San Francisco, Sector Buena Vista, Sector Cañón, Sector Leguillow, and Sector Pueblo Nuevo.

== Historic sites and features ==
Isabel II barrio-pueblo is the location of several historic sites listed on the U.S. National Register of Historic Places, including:

- Fuerte de Vieques (El Fortín Conde de Mirasol)
- Casa Alcaldia de Vieques
- Casa Augusto Delerme
- Casa Delerme-Anduze No. 2
- Casa de Jaime Puig Lemoine
- Delerme-Anduze House
- Las Tumbas de J. J. Maria le Guillou
- Rafael Acevedo House
- Smaine-Ortiz House

== Gallery ==
Places in Isabel II barrio-pueblo:

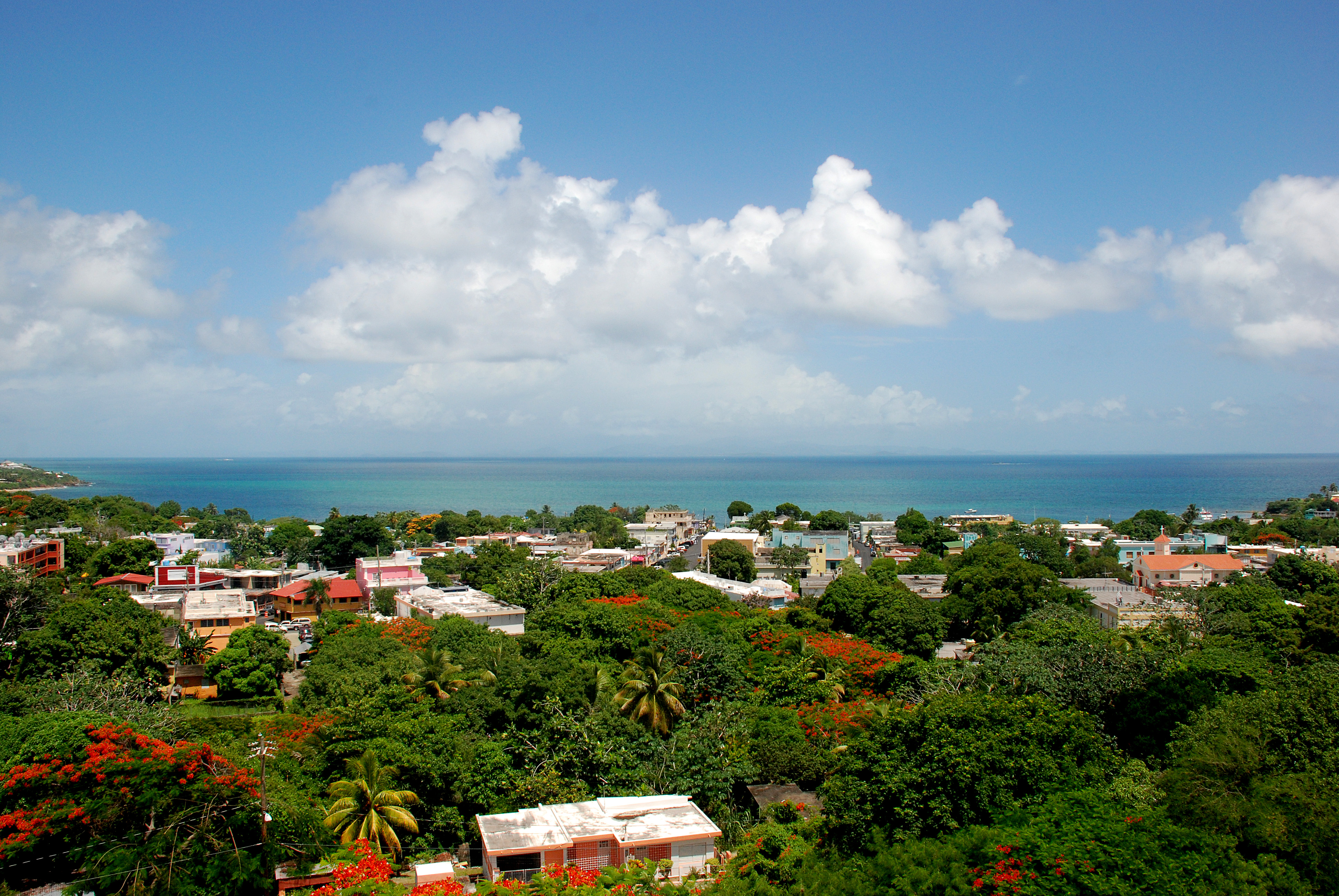
Scenic panorama of Isabel Segunda

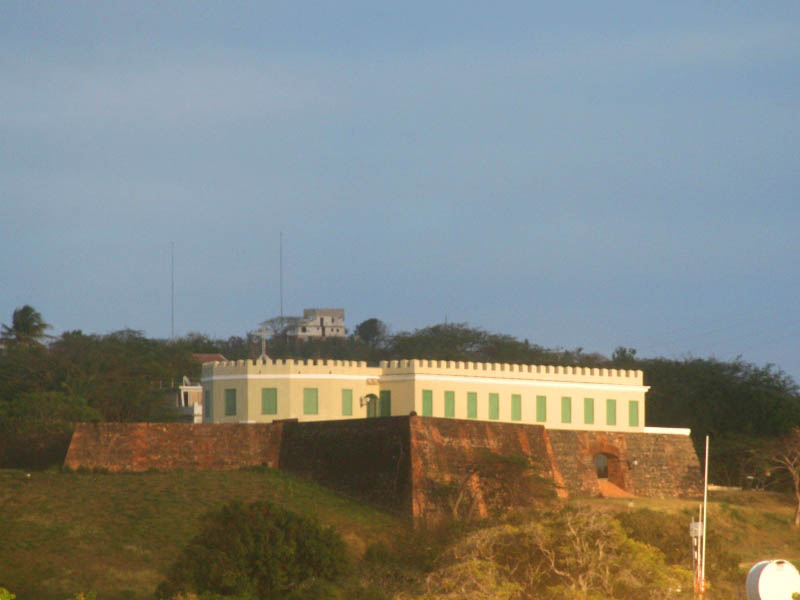
El Fortín Conde de Mirasol

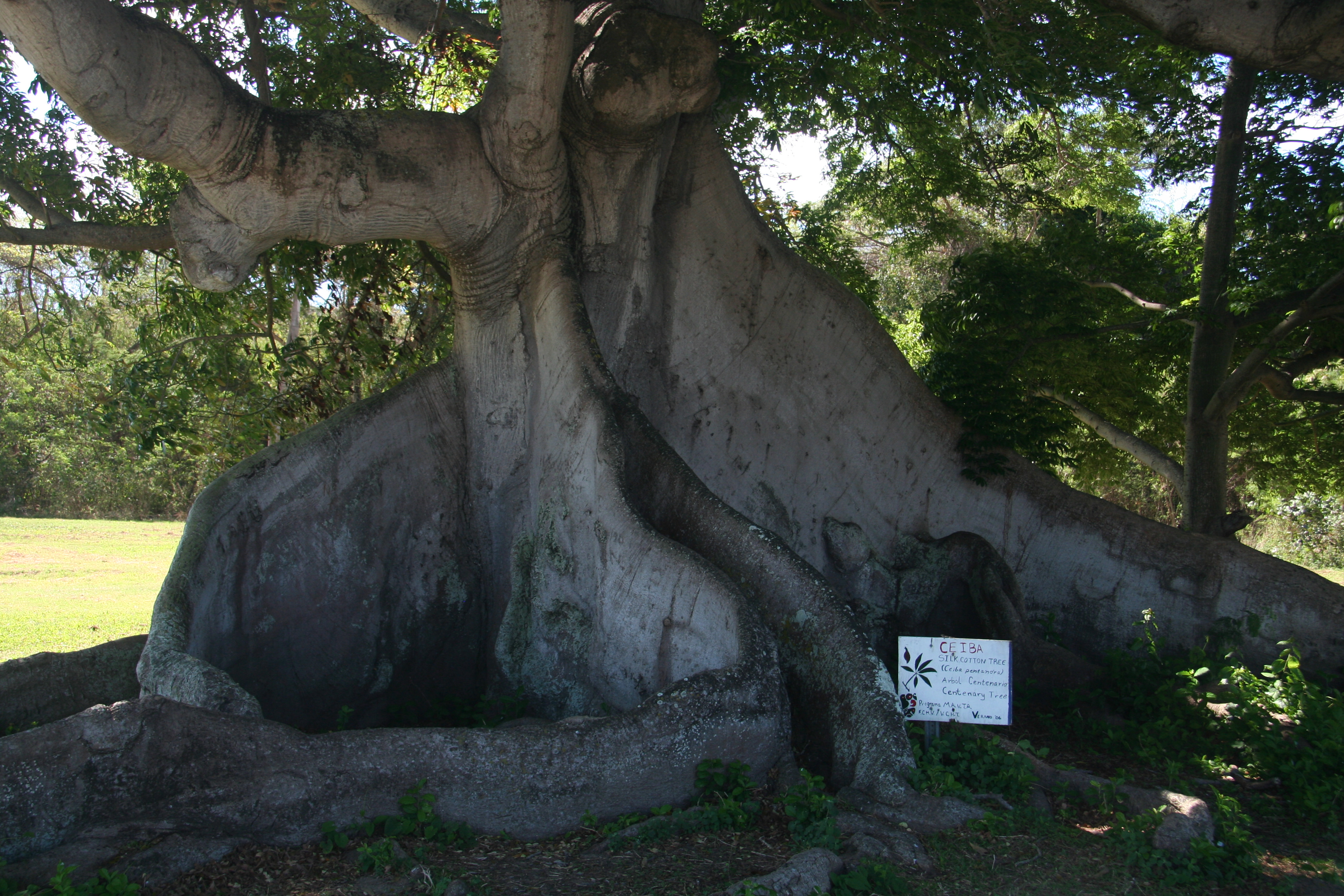
300-year-old Ceiba Tree

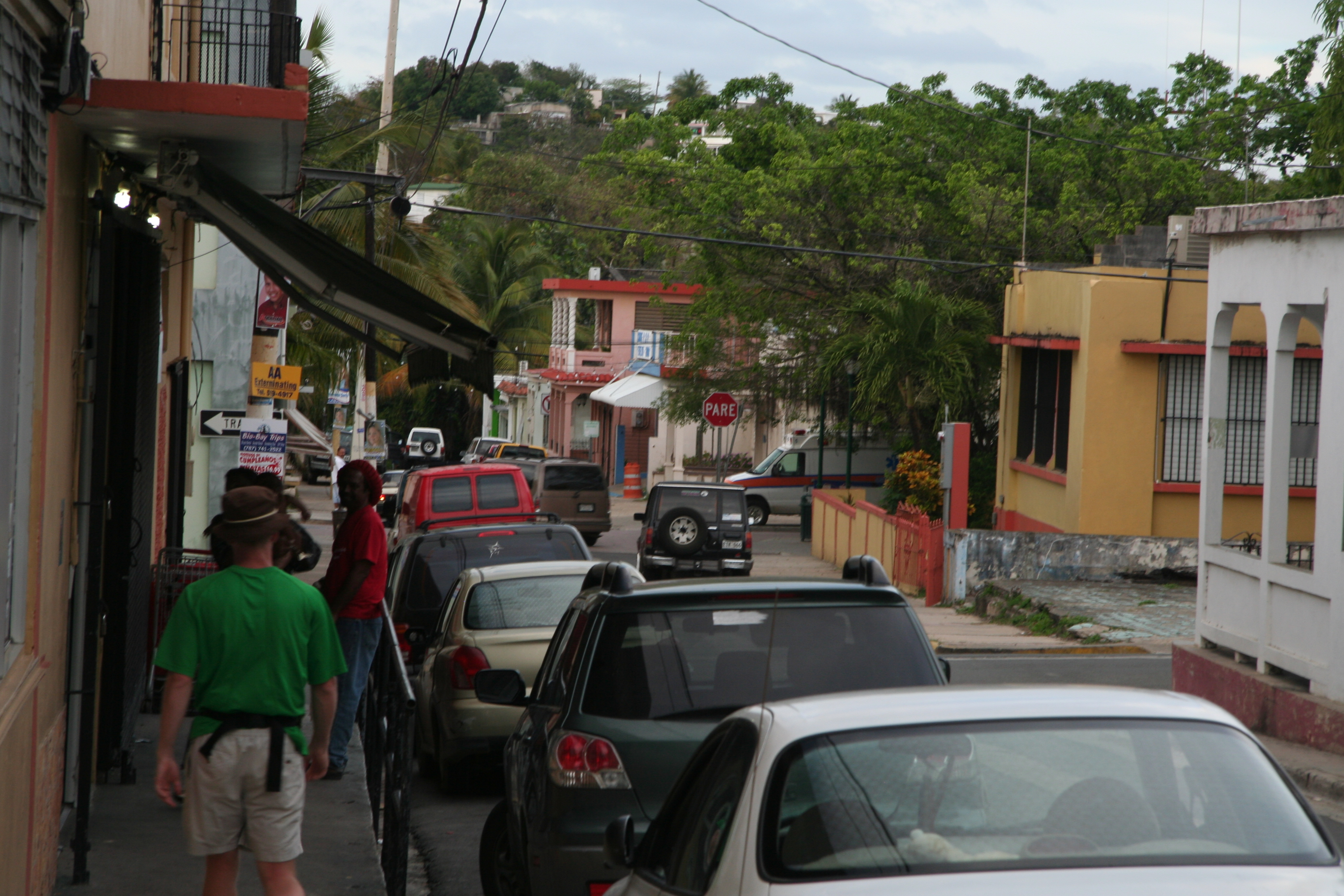
Street in Isabel II barrio-pueblo

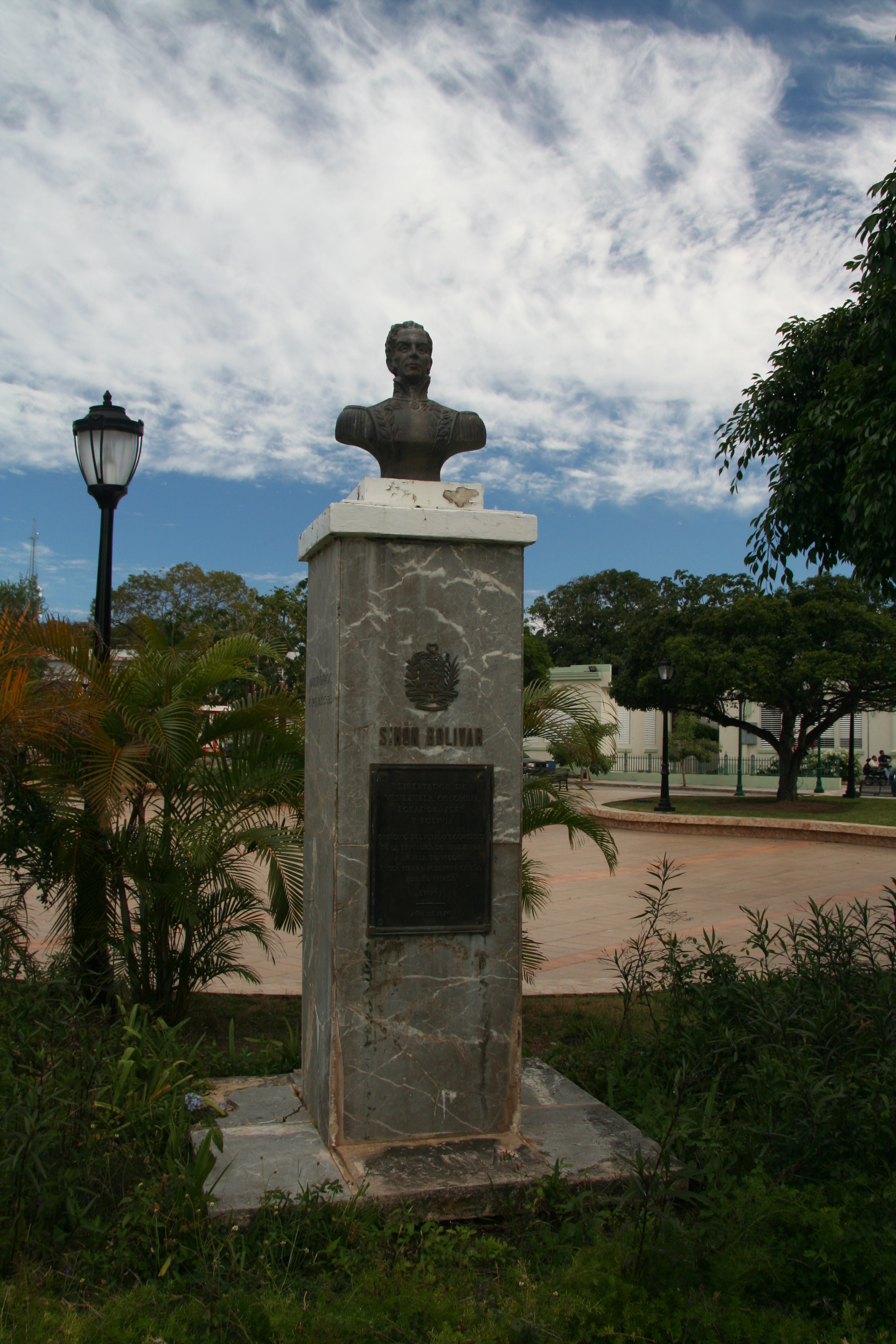
Statue of Simon Bolivar

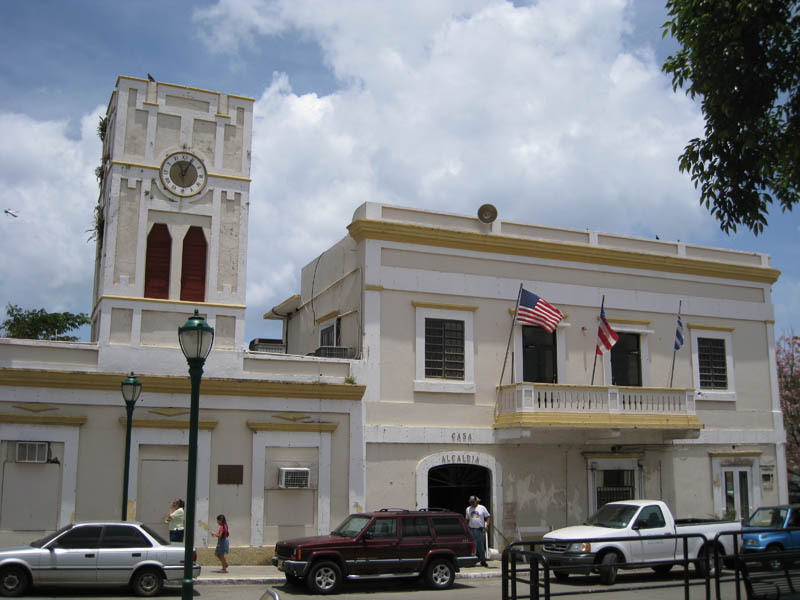
The City Hall

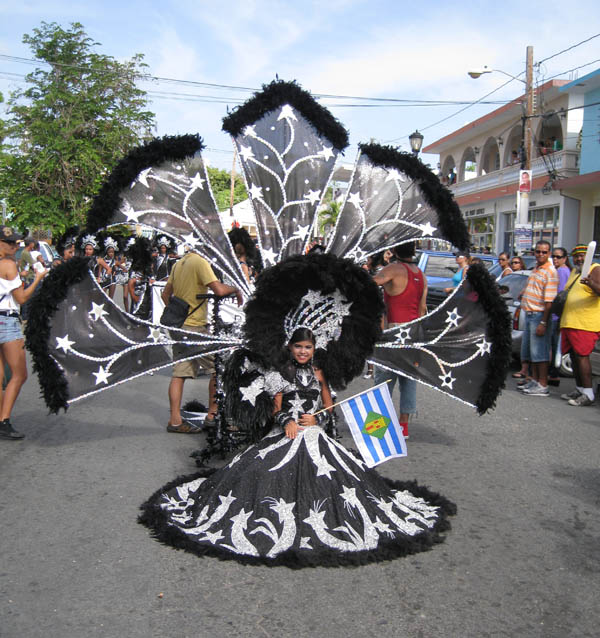
Patron saint festival celebration in 2008

== See also ==
- List of communities in Puerto Rico
- List of barrios and sectors of Vieques, Puerto Rico
