= Fortín Conde de Mirasol =

Historic fort in Vieques, Puerto Rico

- Fuerte de Vieques
- U.S. National Register of Historic Places
- Puerto Rico Historic Sites and Zones
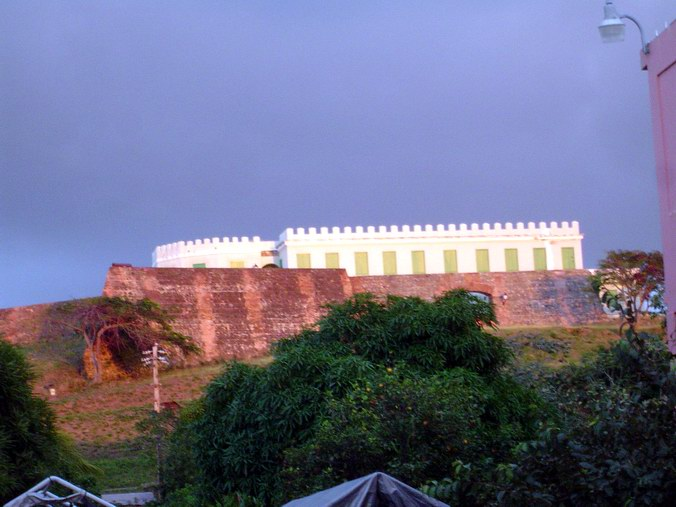

- Location within Puerto Rico
- Location: Calle del Fuerte; Isabel Segunda; Vieques, Puerto Rico
- Coordinates: 18°08′51″N 65°26′21″W
- Built: 1845
- Architectural style: Colonial, Spanish Colonial
- NRHP reference No.: 77001552
- RNSZH No.: 2000-(RE)-18-JP-SH

Significant dates
- Added to NRHP: November 18, 1977
- Designated RNSZH: May 16, 2001

El Fortín Conde de Mirasol, also known as Fuerte de Vieques, is a fort built in 1845 located in the town of Isabel Segunda in Vieques, an island municipality of Puerto Rico. In 1991, the fort was restored by the Institute of Puerto Rican Culture. The structure houses the Vieques Museum of Art and History and the Vieques Historic Archives, an extensive collection of documents related to the history of Vieques. It was listed on the National Register of Historic Places in 1977, and on the Puerto Rico Register of Historic Sites and Zones in 2001.

== Gallery ==
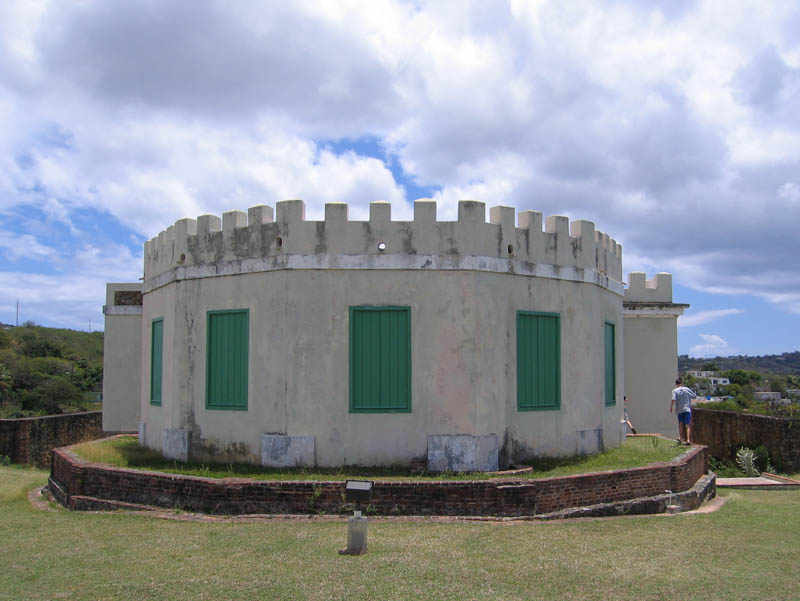
Main building

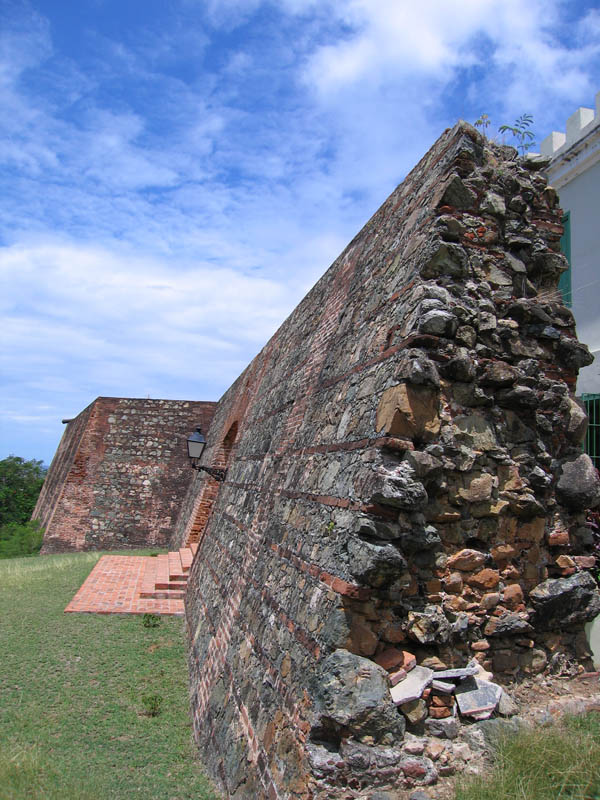
Unfinished wall

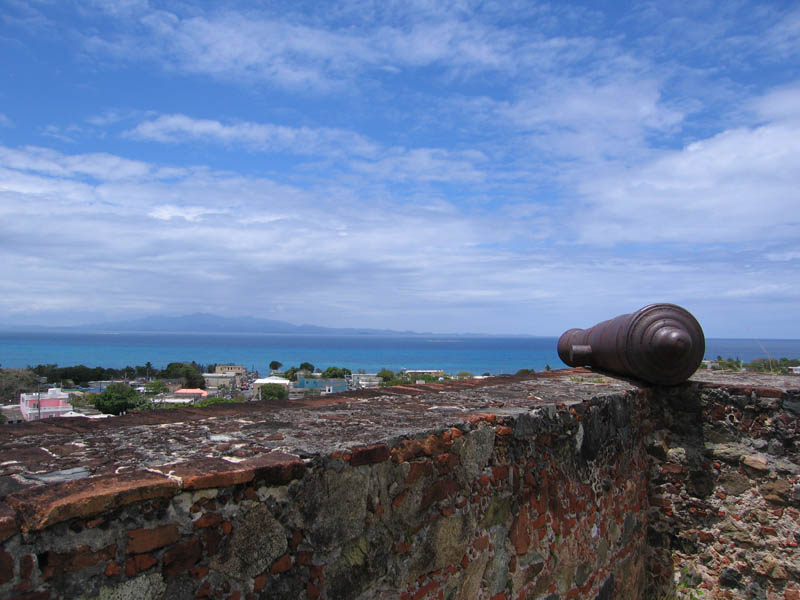
Historical gun

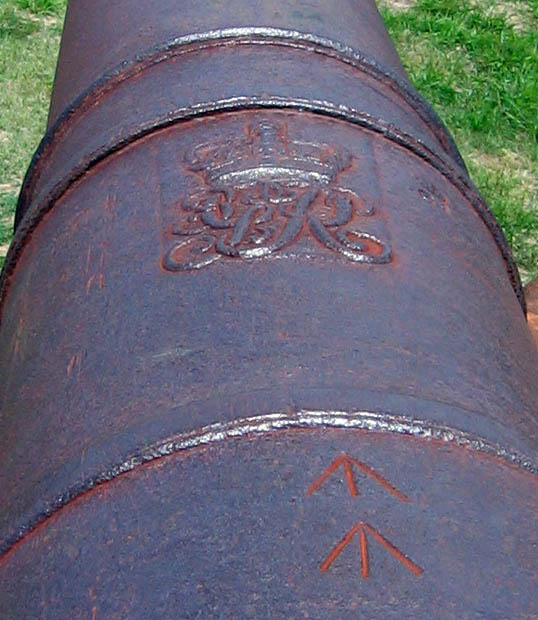
Wrought iron cannon

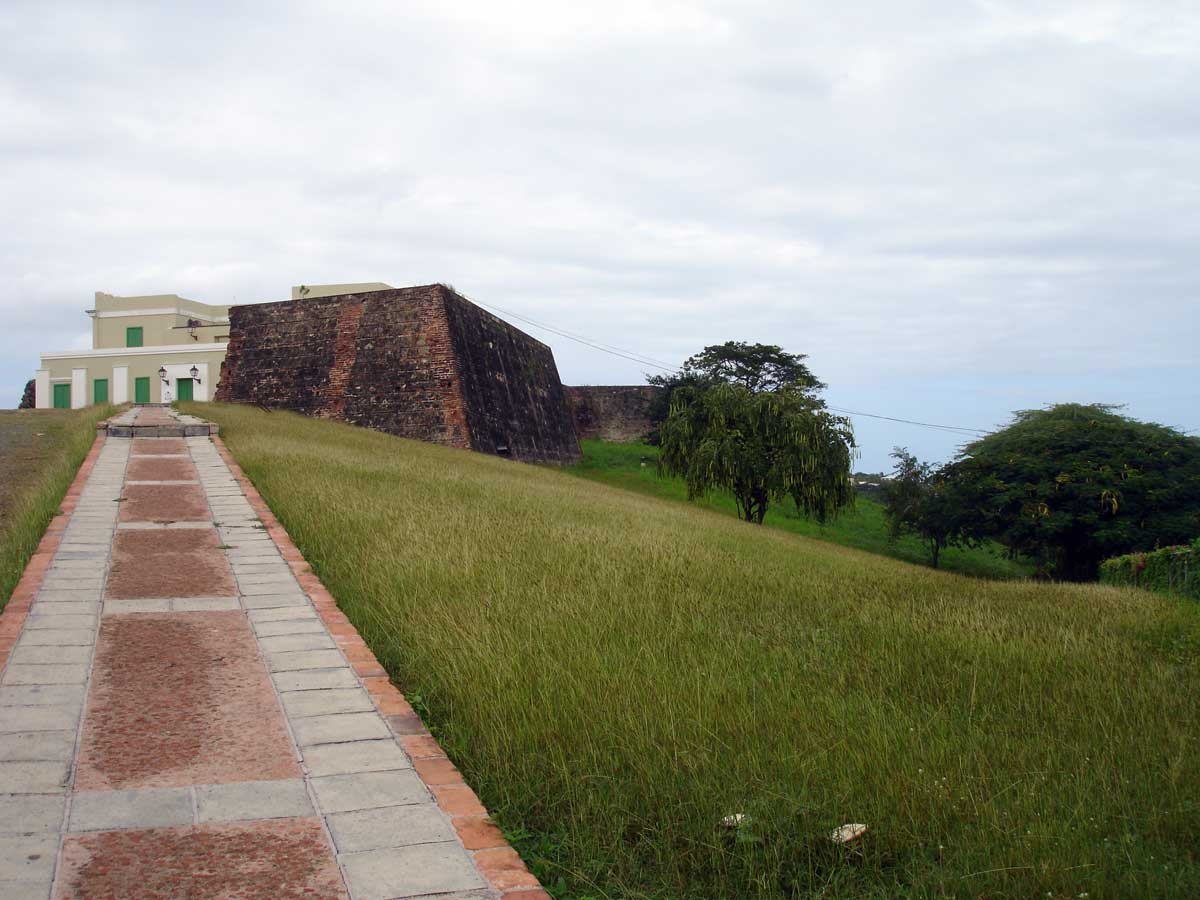
New entrance to the museum

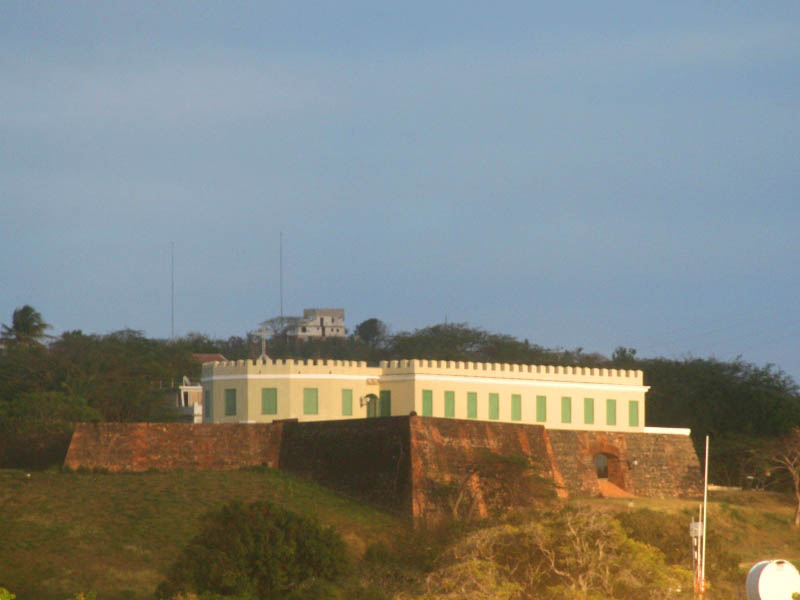
As seen from a boat

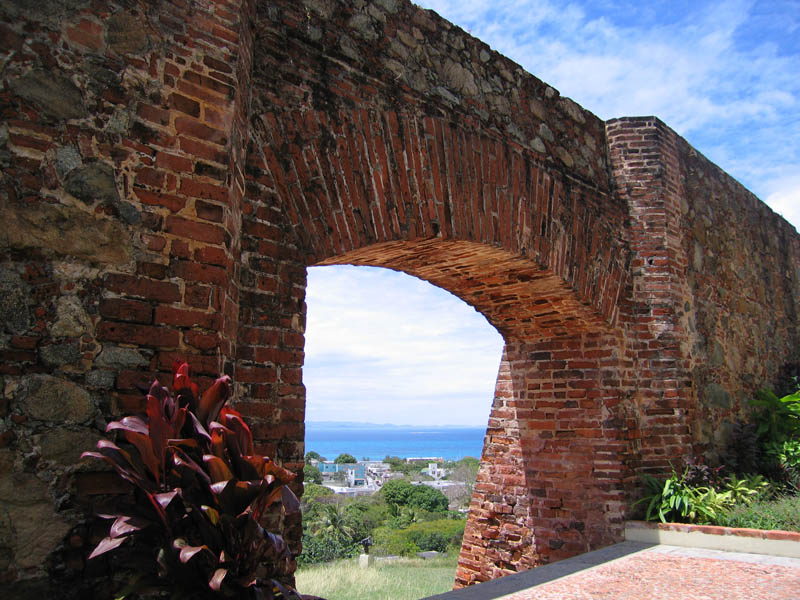
Main gate

== See also ==
- National Register of Historic Places listings in Puerto Rico
