= Rafael Acevedo House =

Historic house in Vieques, Puerto Rico

- U.S. National Register of Historic Places
- Puerto Rico Historic Sites and Zones
- Location within Puerto Rico
- Location: Víctor Duteil Street between San José and Baldorioty Streets in Isabel Segunda, Vieques, Puerto Rico
- Coordinates: 18°09′00″N 65°26′35″W
- Built: 1900
- Architect: Pedro Peterson
- Architectural style: Spanish Creole Vernacular
- NRHP reference No.: 94000249
- RNSZH No.: 2000-(RE)-18-JP-SH

Significant dates
- Added to NRHP: March 17, 1994
- Designated RNSZH: May 16, 2001

The Rafael Acevedo House (Spanish: Casa Rafael Acevedo), also called the Mirella Acevedo Sanes House (Casa Mirella Acevedo Sanes), is a historic residence located in the town of Isabel Segunda, the largest settlement in the Puerto Rican island-municipality of Vieques. It was designed and built in 1900 by Pedro Peterson, a local engineer and master builder. The residence was added to the National Register of Historic Places in 1994 and to the Puerto Rico Register of Historic Sites and Zones in 2001 for being the best-preserved hipped-gable house in Vieques and for being a superb example of the vernacular trends that represent the result of different architectural imports from the British and French West Indies into the Spanish Caribbean.

== See also ==
- National Register of Historic Places listings in eastern Puerto Rico
