= Casa Augusto Delerme =

Historic house in Vieques, Puerto Rico

- U.S. National Register of Historic Places
- Puerto Rico Historic Sites and Zones
- Location within Puerto Rico
- Location: 7 Benítez Guzmán Street Isabel Segunda, Vieques, Puerto Rico
- Coordinates: 18°09′00″N 65°26′30″W
- Built: 1850
- Architect: Unknown
- Architectural style: Vernacular architecture
- NRHP reference No.: 93001555
- RNSZH No.: 2000-(RE)-18-JP-SH

Significant dates
- Added to NRHP: February 2, 1994
- Designated RNSZH: May 16, 2001

The Augusto Delerme House (Spanish: Casa Augusto Delerme), also known as the Pablo Delerme House (Casa Pablo Delerme), is a historic 4-room Creole-vernacular residence located at 7 Benítez Guzmán Street in the town of Isabel Segunda, the largest settlement in the Puerto Rican island-municipality of Vieques. The house was built in 1850 for a local prominent French-born landowner in the architectural style typical of French Creole dwellings in the West Indies with influence from the vernacular 19th-century Criollo architectural styles of Puerto Rico. It was added to the National Register of Historic Places in 1994, and on the Puerto Rico Register of Historic Sites and Zones in 2000.

== See also ==
- French immigration to Puerto Rico
- National Register of Historic Places listings in Puerto Rico
