= National Register of Historic Places listings in central Puerto Rico =

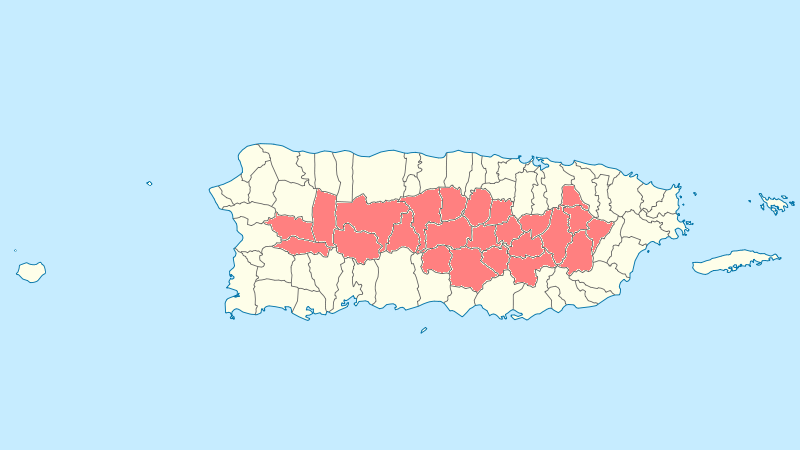
National Register entries listed below are found in the highlighted 24 municipalities of Puerto Rico.

This portion of National Register of Historic Places listings in Puerto Rico is along the central mountain region, from Las Marías and Maricao in the central-west to Juncos in the central-east, including the slopes of the Cordillera.

Names of places given are as appear in the National Register, reflecting name as given in NRHP application at the date of listing. Note, the National Register name system does not accommodate Spanish á, ñ and other letters.

This National Park Service list is complete through NPS recent listings posted August 28, 2026.

== Adjuntas ==
	Name on the Register	Image	Date listed	Location	Barrio	Description
1	Ayuntamiento de Adjuntas	Ayuntamiento de Adjuntas	April 7, 2025 (#100011645)	Rius Rivera Street San Joaquin Corner; 18°09′44″N 66°43′24″W	Adjuntas	Rafael Carmoega-designed city hall built in 1927.
2	Mr. & Mrs. Clark Foreman Mountain Retreat		December 6, 2021 (#100007218)	Barrio Portugues, Carretera 123, Km. 29.9 (Camino Foreman); 18°08′39″N 66°41′25″W	Portugués	Historic Modernist residence designed by German architect Henry Klumb.
3	Las Cabañas Bridge	Las Cabañas Bridge	July 19, 1995 (#95000838)	Highway 135, km 82.4, spanning Río de las Vacas; 18°10′47″N 66°44′11″W	Capáez and Juan González (Note: Several prose sources place the Las Cabañas Bridge in Barrios Capáez and Garzas, while other, map-based sources show it to be in Barrios Capáez and Juan González.)	This 1919 bridge, intended to provide access to a key coffee-producing region, was financed by nearby plantations through public subscription. Designer Rafael Nones and builder Félix Benítez Rexach used a unique combination of steel and concrete technologies to produce a girder design unlike any other on the island.
4	Quinta Vendrell	Quinta Vendrell	February 9, 2006 (#06000028)	Junction of Highway 143 and Highway 123; 18°08′50″N 66°41′24″W	Portugués	Two-story balloon framed country house from 1918 designed by Puerto Rican architect Alfredo Wiechers Pieretti.
5	Washington Irving Graded School	Washington Irving Graded School	May 26, 2015 (#15000274)	Junction of Rodulfo González and Martínez de Andino Streets; 18°09′42″N 66°43′20″W	Adjuntas Pueblo	Historic school designed by Charles G. Post in 1903, and an example of the Late 19th and Early 20th Century American Movements architecture.

== Aguas Buenas ==
	Name on the Register	Image	Date listed	Location	Barrio	Description
1	Parque de Bombas Maximiliano Merced	Parque de Bombas Maximiliano Merced	November 14, 2012 (#12000934)	42 Muñoz Rivera Street; 18°15′24″N 66°06′18″W	Aguas Buenas Pueblo	Also known as the Antiguo Parque de Bombas de Aguas Buenas, a distinctive Art Deco fire station designed by the Deptartment of Public Works of Puerto Rico.

== Aibonito ==
	Name on the Register	Image	Date listed	Location	Barrio	Description
1	Carretera Central	Carretera Central	May 2, 2019 (#100003686)	Highway 14 from Cayey boundary to Coamo boundary (Note: The listed portion of the Carretera Central extends into Caguas, Cidra, Cayey, Aibonito, Coamo, and Juana Díaz. The roadway route in San Juan and Ponce, as well as a portion in Caguas, was excluded from the National Register listing.); 18°08′27″N 66°15′34″W	Robles, Plata, Caonillas, Aibonito Pueblo, Llanos, Pasto, Asomante, and Algarrobo	Built by the Spanish administration during 1846–1886 to connect San Juan with Ponce, this was one of the first modern roadways in Puerto Rico and was regarded as one of the finest roads in the Americas for years after its completion. The listed portion of the road, from Caguas to Juana Díaz, includes the exceptionally challenging engineering through the Cordillera Central, 11 major bridges, 14 maintenance workers' houses, (Note: Spanish: casillas de caminero.) and numerous other roadway structures.
2	Church San José of Aibonito	Church San José of Aibonito	December 10, 1984 (#84000451)	Emeterio Betances Street; 18°08′20″N 66°15′59″W	Aibonito Pueblo	Historic parish church at the main town square of Aibonito designed by Puerto Rico state architect Pedro Cobreros and built in 1897. Part of the Historic Churches of Puerto Rico MPS.
3	La Plata Community Center		October 4, 2021 (#100007066)	PR 173, Km. 1.5; 18°09′19″N 66°14′03″W	Plata	Art Deco-style rural community center building from 1940.
4	Villa Julita	Villa Julita	December 19, 1996 (#86003491)	401 San José Avenue; 18°08′30″N 66°15′27″W	Aibonito Pueblo	Well-preserved Beaux Arts-inspired Criollo house designed by Alfredo Wiechers Pieretti and built in 1915 for the Vendrell-Suárez family. Also known as the Ulrich House.

== Barranquitas ==
	Name on the Register	Image	Date listed	Location	Barrio	Description
1	Casa Natal de Luis Muñoz Rivera	Casa Natal de Luis Muñoz Rivera	September 4, 1984 (#84003139)	Muñoz Rivera and Manuel Torres Streets; 18°11′11″N 66°18′25″W	Barranquitas Pueblo	Well-preserved 19th-century middle class criollo residence and birthplace of Luis Muñoz Rivera, important figure in the history of the development Puerto Rico's political autonomy from Spain. Now operated as a house museum by the Institute of Puerto Rican Culture.
2	El Cortijo		September 11, 2018 (#100002934)	Highway 162, km 18.5; 18°10′57″N 66°18′35″W	Barranquitas Pueblo	Historic Mission Revival rural villa designed by architect Rafael Carmoega Morales as a summer residence for the Lozana-Fabián family with gardens inspired by the Catalonian modernism of Parc Güell.
3	Palo Hincado Site		September 2, 1999 (#99001021)	Address restricted	Address restricted	Archaeological site consisting of ball courts or bateyes with petroglyphs. Many of the objects have been removed by collectors. Part of the Ball Courts/Plaza Sites of Puerto Rico and the U.S. Virgin Islands MPS.

== Caguas ==
	Name on the Register	Image	Date listed	Location	Barrio	Description
1	Aguayo Aldea Vocational High School	Aguayo Aldea Vocational High School	September 4, 1987 (#87001311)	Junction of San Juan and Principal Streets; 18°13′56″N 66°01′49″W	Caguas Pueblo	Historic Art Deco vocational high school from 1939.
2	Alcaldía de Caguas	Alcaldía de Caguas	March 22, 1989 (#88001307)	42 Muñoz Rivera Street; 18°14′05″N 66°02′09″W	Caguas Pueblo	Well-preserved historic Neoclassical city hall built in 1856 at the site of the former regional "casa del rey". Now houses the Caguas Museum of History.
3	Carretera Central	Carretera Central	May 2, 2019 (#100003686)	Highway 1 from km 40 to Cidra boundary 18°11′10″N 66°04′32″W	Turabo, Borinquen, and Beatriz	Built by the Spanish administration during 1846–1886 to connect San Juan with Ponce, this was one of the first modern roadways in Puerto Rico and was regarded as one of the finest roads in the Americas for years after its completion. The listed portion of the road, from Caguas to Juana Díaz, includes the exceptionally challenging engineering through the Cordillera Central, 11 major bridges, 14 maintenance workers' houses, and numerous other roadway structures.
4	Gautier Benítez High School	Gautier Benítez High School	June 15, 1988 (#88000657)	Gautier Benítez Avenue and Cristóbal Colón Boulevard; 18°13′40″N 66°02′10″W	Caguas Pueblo	Prominent Classical Revival high school built in 1924.
5	Logia Unión y Amparo No. 44	Logia Unión y Amparo No. 44	June 15, 1988 (#88000661)	39 Acosta Street; 18°14′02″N 66°02′01″W	Caguas Pueblo	Greek Revival masonic lodge from 1875 designed by Antonin Nechodoma.
6	Primera Iglesia Bautista de Caguas	Primera Iglesia Bautista de Caguas	September 24, 2008 (#08000949)	Corner of Ruiz Belvis and Intendente Ramírez Streets; 18°14′05″N 66°02′01″W	Caguas Pueblo	Historic Baptist church built in the Romanesque Revival style in 1909.
7	Puente No. 6	Puente No. 6	May 28, 2009 (#09000361)	Highway 798, km 1.0; 18°17′43″N 66°03′26″W	Río Cañas	Historic barrel vault bridge built across the Cañas River in 1856. Also known as La Concepción Bridge.

== Cayey ==
	Name on the Register	Image	Date listed	Location	Barrio	Description
1	Arenas Bridge	Arenas Bridge	July 19, 1995 (#95000843)	Highway 735, km 1.3, spanning Río de la Plata; 18°08′03″N 66°08′17″W	Monte Llano and Arenas (Note: The Arenas Bridge spans the boundary between Cayey (Barrio Monte Llano) and Cidra (Barrio Arenas) municipalities.)	Well-preserved metal truss bridge from 1894, also known as La Plata River Bridge.
2	Carretera #4	Carretera #4	October 30, 2020 (#100005741)	PR-15, from km. 0 in Guayama to km. 25.7 in Cayey; 18°03′01″N 66°08′07″W	Guayama to Cayey	Carretera #4 (Actually PR-15) including the bridge Puente Principe Alfonso XII.
3	Carretera Central	Carretera Central	May 2, 2019 (#100003686)	Highway 1 from Cidra boundary to km 55.4; Highway 14 from km 74 to Aibonito boundary; Highway 735; 18°07′26″N 66°10′53″W	Beatriz, Vegas, Monte Llano, Cayey Pueblo, Rincón, Toíta, and Matón Abajo	Built by the Spanish administration during 1846–1886 to connect San Juan with Ponce, this was one of the first modern roadways in Puerto Rico and was regarded as one of the finest roads in the Americas for years after its completion. The listed portion of the road, from Caguas to Juana Díaz, includes the exceptionally challenging engineering through the Cordillera Central, 11 major bridges, 14 maintenance workers' houses, and numerous other roadway structures.
4	Church Nuestra Señora de la Asunción of Cayey	Church Nuestra Señora de la Asunción of Cayey	December 10, 1984 (#84000454)	Muñoz Rivera Street, Town Plaza; 18°06′46″N 66°09′57″W	Cayey Pueblo	Spanish Colonial style church from 1815, designed by José Canovas.
5	La Liendre Bridge	La Liendre Bridge	July 19, 1995 (#95000844)	Highway 735, km 0.7, spanning Quebrada Beatriz; 18°08′05″N 66°07′54″W	Vegas and Arenas (Note: The La Liendre Bridge spans the boundary between Cayey (Barrio Vegas) and Cidra (Barrio Arenas) municipalities.)	An iron lattice lateral girder bridge from 1877. Also known as Bridge No. 467.
6	Río Matón Bridge	Río Matón Bridge	July 19, 1995 (#95000841)	Highway 14, km 63.2, spanning Río Matón; 18°08′23″N 66°12′39″W	Matón Abajo	A lateral solid web girder bridge designed by Spanish engineer Manuel Lopez-Bayo built across Matón River in 1886.
7	Juana Rodríguez Morales House	Juana Rodríguez Morales House	April 6, 2005 (#05000257)	7 Nuñez Romeu Street; 18°06′48″N 66°09′58″W	Cayey Pueblo	Spanish Creole townhouse from 1850. Also known as the Espadi-Cervoni House. Today it hosts the Historic House of Music in Cayey.

== Ciales ==
	Name on the Register	Image	Date listed	Location	Barrio	Description
1	Manatí Bridge at Mata de Plátano	Manatí Bridge at Mata de Plátano	July 19, 1995 (#95000847)	Highway 6685, km 9.7, spanning Río Grande de Manatí; 18°21′32″N 66°28′45″W	Hato Viejo	Also known as the Juan José Jiménez Bridge. It was the first truss bridge built in Puerto Rico under the administration of the United States (1898–1900) after the Spanish–American War.

== Cidra ==
	Name on the Register	Image	Date listed	Location	Barrio	Description
1	Arenas Bridge	Arenas Bridge	July 19, 1995 (#95000843)	Highway 735, km 1.3, spanning Río de la Plata; 18°08′04″N 66°08′17″W	Arenas and Monte Llano	A metal truss bridge from 1894, also known as La Plata River Bridge.
2	La Bolero		August 28, 2012 (#12000584)	Highway 173, km 0.5; 18°10′50″N 66°09′41″W	Ceiba	Prototypical Modernist factory building. Part of the Early Prototypes for Manufacturing Plants in Puerto Rico, 1948-1958 Multiple Property Submission (MPS).
3	Carretera Central		May 2, 2019 (#100003686)	Highway 1 from Caguas boundary to Cayey boundary; Highway 735; 18°09′07″N 66°06′18″W	Beatriz and Arenas	Built by the Spanish administration during 1846–1886 to connect San Juan with Ponce, this was one of the first modern roadways in Puerto Rico and was regarded as one of the finest roads in the Americas for years after its completion. The listed portion of the road, from Caguas to Juana Díaz, includes the exceptionally challenging engineering through the Cordillera Central, 11 major bridges, 14 maintenance workers' houses, and numerous other roadway structures.
4	La Liendre Bridge	La Liendre Bridge	July 19, 1995 (#95000844)	Highway 735, km 0.7, spanning Quebrada Beatriz; 18°08′05″N 66°07′54″W	Arenas and Vegas	An iron lattice lateral girder bridge from 1877 built along the Carretera Central (Puerto Rico).
5	Teatro Iberia		October 5, 2023 (#100009465)	24 Jose de Diego; 18°10′33″N 66°09′43″W	Cidra Pueblo	Historic theater, now a municipal cultural center.

== Coamo ==
	Name on the Register	Image	Date listed	Location	Barrio	Description
1	Carretera Central	Carretera Central	May 2, 2019 (#100003686)	Highway 14 from Aibonito boundary to Juana Díaz boundary 18°04′39″N 66°21′43″W	Cuyón, Palmarejo, Coamo Pueblo, San Ildefonso, and Los Llanos	Built by the Spanish administration during 1846–1886 to connect San Juan with Ponce, this was one of the first modern roadways in Puerto Rico and was regarded as one of the finest roads in the Americas for years after its completion. The listed portion of the road, from Caguas to Juana Díaz, includes the exceptionally challenging engineering through the Cordillera Central, 11 major bridges, 14 maintenance workers' houses, and numerous other roadway structures.
2	Casa Blanca	Casa Blanca	April 28, 1992 (#92000379)	17 José I. Quintón Street; 18°04′48″N 66°21′22″W	Coamo Pueblo	Spanish Creole architecture from 1865 designed by Raymundo Camprubi.
3	Church San Blas de Illescas of Coamo	Church San Blas de Illescas of Coamo	December 10, 1984 (#84000463)	Mario Braschi Street; 18°04′51″N 66°21′22″W	Coamo Pueblo	Latin American Baroque architecture of a church from 1661, one of the oldest parish churches in the island.
4	General Méndez Vigo Bridge	General Méndez Vigo Bridge	July 19, 1995 (#95000839)	Highway 14, km 30.4, spanning Las Minas River; 18°03′50″N 66°22′27″W	San Ildefonso	Brick barrel vault bridge from 1898, by US Corps of Engineers, also known as Las Minas River Bridge.
5	Hermitage Church of Nuestra Señora de Valvanera of Coamo		March 31, 1986 (#86000700)	Junction of José I. Quintón and Carrión Maduro Streets; 18°04′46″N 66°21′33″W	Coamo Pueblo	Historic church from 1685. Today part of the Colegio Valvanera Catholic school.
6	Padre Íñigo Bridge	Padre Íñigo Bridge	July 19, 1995 (#95000840)	Highway 14, km 34.2, spanning Río Coamo; 18°04′53″N 66°21′15″W	Coamo Pueblo and Palmarejo	Lattice girder bridge from 1879 designed by Raymundo Campubri and built as part of the Carretera Central (Puerto Rico). Today a pedestrian bridge that crosses the Coamo River.
7	Picó Pomar Residence	Picó Pomar Residence	July 12, 1988 (#88000961)	Junction of José I. Quintón and Mario Braschi Streets; 18°04′49″N 66°21′25″W	Coamo Pueblo	Spanish Neoclassical residential building from 1840, also served as a coffee, tobacco and sugar trade and distribution center. Today it hosts Coamo Historic Museum.
8	Puente de las Calabazas	Puente de las Calabazas	February 17, 2009 (#09000042)	Highway 14, km 39.3, spanning Río Cuyón; 18°05′17″N 66°18′48″W	Cuyón	Lattice girder bridge from 1882, part of the Carretera Central historic district.

== Comerío ==
	Name on the Register	Image	Date listed	Location	Barrio	Description
1	Comerio Hydroelectric Development	Comerio Hydroelectric Development	September 1, 2022 (#100008110)	PR167, Km. 3.9 to 6.0; 18°15′39″N 66°12′25″W	Comerío	Historic hydroelectric dam from 1906 built along the La Plata River to provide electricity to the San Juan metropolitan area until the 1930s. Popularly known as El Salto dam.
2	Cueva La Mora		March 10, 1983 (#83002292)	Address restricted	Address restricted	Cave containing pre-Hispanic petroglyphs and pictographs. Part of the Prehistoric Rock Art of Puerto Rico MPS.
3	Río Hondo Bridge	Río Hondo Bridge	July 19, 1995 (#95000842)	Highway 156, km 26.9, spanning Río Hondo; 18°12′31″N 66°14′35″W	Río Hondo	Originally installed in 1881 over the Río de la Plata, this span survived an 1899 hurricane, then was moved and re-installed on new abutments in 1908. As of 1995, it was the oldest bridge truss in Puerto Rico, employing a double pony truss design and unique open-web transverse joists. It was removed in 2001.

== Corozal ==
	Name on the Register	Image	Date listed	Location	Barrio	Description
1	Mavilla Bridge	Mavilla Bridge	July 19, 1995 (#95000848)	Highway 159, km 17.7, spanning Río Mavilla; 18°21′07″N 66°17′50″W	Palmarejo and Abras	Historic concrete-lowered, arch bridge from 1903 built across the Mavilla River. Associated with local legends. Also known as Bridge No. 354.

== Gurabo ==
	Name on the Register	Image	Date listed	Location	Barrio	Description
1	Church San José of Gurabo	Church San José of Gurabo	September 18, 1984 (#84003142)	Santiago and Eugenio Sánches López Streets; 18°15′18″N 65°58′21″W	Gurabo Pueblo	Historic parish church from 1821.

== Jayuya ==
	Name on the Register	Image	Date listed	Location	Barrio	Description
1	La Piedra Escrita	La Piedra Escrita	January 15, 2003 (#02001720)	Highway 144, km 8; 18°13′02″N 66°34′23″W	Coabey	Prehistoric rock art site at the Saliente River popularly associated with the Taino people.

== Juncos ==
	Name on the Register	Image	Date listed	Location	Barrio	Description
1	Cárcel Municipal de Juncos		January 29, 2025 (#100011436)	Calle Agüeybaná Esq. calle Baldorioty; 18°13′36″N 65°55′24″W	Juncos Pueblo	Historic municipal prison, currently functioning as the Juncos Municipal Office of Culture and Tourism.
2	José Miguel Gallardo School	José Miguel Gallardo School	November 14, 2012 (#12000937)	Junction of Paseo Escuté and Algarín Street; 18°13′41″N 65°55′27″W	Juncos Pueblo	Former school turned-public library, and a prime example of Beaux Arts and Mission/Spanish Revival architecture in Puerto Rico.

== Lares ==
	Name on the Register	Image	Date listed	Location	Barrio	Description
1	Callejones Site		September 2, 1999 (#99001022)	Address restricted	Address restricted	An archaeological site consisting of a ceremonial ballcourt known as a batey dating from the Early Ostionoid (pre-Taino) (AD 600–1200) and Late Ostionoid (Taíno) (AD 1200–1500) periods.
2	Hacienda Los Torres	Hacienda Los Torres	September 28, 2006 (#06000896)	Junction of Highways 111 and 129; 18°17′48″N 66°52′16″W	Lares	Mission/Spanish Revival-style residence building from 1846.

== Las Marías ==
	Name on the Register	Image	Date listed	Location	Barrio	Description
1	Eugenio María de Hostos School	Eugenio María de Hostos School	December 19, 2012 (#12001077)	Matías Brugman Avenue; 18°15′00″N 66°59′23″W	Las Marías Pueblo	Early 20th century school building designed in the Mission Revival style.

== Maricao ==
	Name on the Register	Image	Date listed	Location	Barrio	Description
1	Church San Juan Bautista of Maricao	Church San Juan Bautista of Maricao	September 18, 1984 (#84003125)	Baldorioty Street, Town Plaza; 18°10′51″N 66°58′46″W	Maricao Pueblo	Gothic Revival church built by Jeronimo Jiminez Coranado in 1890.
2	Del Treinta Bridge		July 19, 1995 (#95000846)	Highway 128, km 32.7; 18°10′00″N 66°51′48″W	Indiera Alta	A rolled steel beam bridge from 1924, designed by Enrique Ortega.
3	Vivero de Peces de Maricao	Vivero de Peces de Maricao	February 21, 2017 (#100000667)	Highway 410, km 1.7; 18°10′14″N 66°59′14″W	Maricao Afuera	Historic fish hatchery built by the Civilian Conservation Corps next to the Rosario River within the boundaries of the Maricao State Forest. Also known as the Insular Fish Hatchery, part of the New Deal Era Constructions in the Forest Reserves of Puerto Rico MPS.

== Morovis ==
	Name on the Register	Image	Date listed	Location	Barrio	Description
1	José Fontán School	José Fontán School	August 28, 2012 (#12000582)	Junction of Del Carmen Street and Principal Street final 18°19′34″N 66°24′32″W	Morovis Pueblo	History early 20th century school building, part of the Early Twentieth Century Schools in Puerto Rico Thematic Resource (TR).

== Naranjito ==
	Name on the Register	Image	Date listed	Location	Barrio	Description
1	Escuela Guillermo Esteves	Escuela Guillermo Esteves	December 19, 2012 (#12001078)	Junction of Georgetti and Achiote Streets; 18°18′05″N 66°14′55″W	Naranjito Pueblo	Mediterranean Revival-style school building from 1925. Also known as the Mercedes Rosario Middle School.
2	Plata Bridge	Plata Bridge	July 19, 1995 (#95000849)	Highway 167, km 0.9; 18°18′14″N 66°12′40″W	Nuevo and Dajaos (Note: The Plata Bridge spans the boundary between Naranjito (Barrio Nuevo) and Bayamón (Barrio Dajaos) municipalities.)	Remains of a notable Parker truss bridge from 1908. Also known as Bridge #374.

== Orocovis ==
	Name on the Register	Image	Date listed	Location	Barrio	Description
1	Cueva La Espiral		September 20, 2011 (#11000673)	Address restricted	Bauta Abajo	Cave site with indigenous rock art. Part of the Prehistoric Rock Art of Puerto Rico MPS.

== San Lorenzo ==
	Name on the Register	Image	Date listed	Location	Barrio	Description
1	Nuestra Señora de las Mercedes de San Miguel de Hato Grande	Nuestra Señora de las Mercedes de San Miguel de Hato Grande	December 8, 1983 (#83004194)	Colón Street, at Town Plaza; 18°11′25″N 65°57′39″W	San Lorenzo Pueblo	Also known as Las Mercedes, this Classical Revival style building was built in 1737.
2	Residencia Machín–Ramos	Residencia Machín–Ramos	May 5, 1989 (#88001180)	Eugenio Sánchez López Street; 18°11′27″N 65°57′40″W	San Lorenzo Pueblo	One of the best-preserved Spanish Colonial residential buildings in the region. Built in a Canarian vernacular style sometime before 1883 for the Machín family.

== Trujillo Alto ==
	Name on the Register	Image	Date listed	Location	Barrio	Description
1	Puente de Trujillo Alto	Puente de Trujillo Alto	January 28, 2010 (#09001289)	Highway 181, km 5.6; 18°21′27″N 66°00′13″W	Cuevas and Dos Bocas	Steel platform bridge built by the U.S. Steel over the Río Grande de Loíza; built in 1939, at the time the longest single-span bridge in Puerto Rico.

== Utuado ==
	Name on the Register	Image	Date listed	Location	Barrio	Description
1	Bateyes de Viví		June 21, 2007 (#07000584)	Address restricted	Viví Arriba	Archaeological site consisting of a number of ball courts or bateyes. Also known as the Dance Grounds of the Butterbaughs Estate and as the Vega del Hoyo Site. Part of the Ball Court/Plaza Sites of Puerto Rico and the U.S. Virgin Islands MPS.
2	Blanco Bridge	Blanco Bridge	July 19, 1995 (#95000837)	Highway 10, km 48.1, spanning the Pellejas River; 18°13′48″N 66°43′02″W	Arenas	1924 bridge built to span the Pellejas River. Also known as Bridge 152. Part of the Historic Bridges of Puerto Rico MPS.
3	Caguana Ceremonial Ball Courts Site	Caguana Ceremonial Ball Courts Site	December 17, 1992 (#92001671)	Highway 111, km 12.3; 18°17′42″N 66°46′52″W	Caguana	One of the best-preserved ballcourt sites in the Caribbean, an archaeoastronomical site consisting of a number of ceremonial courts or bateyes with petroglyph-carved monoliths. Today it also hosts an interpretative park and a museum.
4	Church San Miguel Arcángel of Utuado	Church San Miguel Arcángel of Utuado	December 10, 1984 (#84000447)	Dr. Barbosa Street, Town Plaza; 18°15′55″N 66°41′58″W	Utuado Pueblo	Spanish Neoclassical parish church built in 1866 and designed by Onofre Llorapart. Part of the Historic Churches of Puerto Rico TR.

== Villalba ==
	Name on the Register	Image	Date listed	Location	Barrio	Description
1	Walter McK. Jones School	Walter McK. Jones School	January 29, 2013 (#12001249)	28 Luis Muñoz Rivera Street; 18°07′47″N 66°29′31″W	Villalba Pueblo	Historic Mission Revival-style school building from 1926. Part of the Early Twentieth Century Schools in Puerto Rico TR.

== See also ==
- National Register of Historic Places listings in Puerto Rico
- National Register of Historic Places listings in eastern Puerto Rico
- National Register of Historic Places listings in southern Puerto Rico
- National Register of Historic Places listings in northern Puerto Rico
- National Register of Historic Places listings in western Puerto Rico
- National Register of Historic Places listings in San Juan, Puerto Rico
- List of United States National Historic Landmarks in United States commonwealths and territories, associated states, and foreign states
- Historic preservation
- History of Puerto Rico
