= Río de la Mina =

Río de la Mina may refer to the following rivers:

- Río de la Mina (Río Grande, Puerto Rico)
- Río de la Mina (Coamo, Puerto Rico)

== See also ==
- Las Minas (disambiguation)
