= List of churches in the Diocese of Caguas =

This is a list of current and former Roman Catholic churches in the Diocese of Caguas, one of the suffragan dioceses of the Archdiocese of San Juan de Puerto Rico. The jurisdiction of this diocese comprises the Puerto Rican municipalities of Aguas Buenas, Aibonito, Barranquitas, Caguas, Cayey, Cidra, Comerío, Gurabo, Juncos, Las Piedras, Maunabo, Naranjito, San Lorenzo and Yabucoa.

The mother church of the diocese is the Cathedral of Dulce Nombre de Jesús in Caguas.

== Municipality of Aguas Buenas ==
Church name	Image	Location	Date est.	Description/notes
Espíritu Santo		Juan Asencio	1991	
La Divina Misericordia		Mula		Church and convent served by the Sisters of the Divine Compassion.
Los Tres Santos Reyes		Aguas Buenas Pueblo	1845	Main town parish of Aguas Buenas, located across from the Plaza Luis A. Ferré Aguayo. The first concrete structure was erected in 1881, while the current church building dates to the second half of the 20th century.
Perpetuo Socorro		Sumidero		
San Gerardo Mayela		Juan Asencio		
Santa Teresita		Bayamoncito		
Santísimo Redentor		Jagueyes		

== Municipality of Aibonito ==
Church name	Image	Location	Date est.	Description/notes
Nuestra Señora del Carmen		Llanos		
San José		Aibonito Pueblo	1825	Main town parish of Aibonito, located across from the main town square. The current church structure dates to 1897 and has the distinction of being the last town parish to be consecrated under the Spanish Crown in the Americas.
San Judas Tadeo		Robles		
Virgen de la Providencia		Llanos		

== Municipality of Barranquitas ==
Church name	Image	Location	Date est.	Description/notes
Inmaculada Concepción		Barrancas		
Nuestra Señora de la Providencia		Cañabón		
Nuestra Señora del Perpetuo Socorro		Palo Hincado		
Nuestra Señora del Pilar		Barrancas		
Sagrado Corazón		Quebradillas		
San Andrés Apóstol		Quebradillas	1986	
San Antonio de Padua		Barranquitas Pueblo	1809	Main town church of Barranquitas, located across from the main town square. The current church was designed by state architect Francisco Porrata Doria and built in 1933.
San Francisco de Asís		Palo Hincado		
San José Obrero		Helechal		

== Municipality of Caguas ==
Church name	Image	Location	Date est.	Description/notes
Cristo Rey		Río Cañas		
Dulce Nombre de Jesús		Caguas Pueblo	1645	Cathedral and main town church of Caguas, located across from Plaza Palmer and the old city hall. The cathedral contains the remains of blessed Carlos Manuel Rodríguez Santiago. The current façade dates to 1930.
El Salvador		San Salvador		
Inmaculado Corazón de María		Río Cañas	1971	
María, Madre de la Iglesia		Cañabón	1982	
Nuestra Señora de la Providencia		Turabo	1965	
Nuestra Señora del Carmen		Cañaboncito		
Sagrado Corazón		Beatriz	1963	
San Antonio de Padua		Caguas Pueblo		
San Antonio de Padua		San Antonio		
San Felipe Apóstol		Río Cañas		
San Gerardo		Caguas Pueblo		
San José		Bairoa	1960	Served by the Discalced Carmelites. Formerly served the Colegio San José de Villa Blanca parochial school.
San Juan Apóstol y Evangelista		Bairoa	1982	With Colegio San Juan Apóstol parochial school.
San Pablo Apóstol		Tomás de Castro	1980	
San Pedro Apóstol		Cañaboncito	1982	
Santa Teresita del Niño Jesús		Río Cañas		
Santísima Trinidad		Cañaboncito	1986	
Santísimo Sacramento		Tomás de Castro	1967	

== Municipality of Cayey ==
Church name	Image	Location	Date est.	Description/notes
Nuestra Señora de la Asunción		Cayey Pueblo	1787	Main town parish of Cayey, located on the Plaza Pública Ramón Frade de León. The current church building, designed by state architect José Canovas, dates to 1815 and its tower to 1889.
Sagrado Corazón de Jesús		Jájome Alto		
San José de la Montaña		Guavate		
San Pedro Armengol		Rincón		
San Pedro Nolasco		Farallón		
San Ramón Nonato		Cayey Pueblo		
San Ramón Nonato		Vegas		
Virgen del Carmen		Pasto Viejo		

== Municipality of Cidra ==
Church name	Image	Location	Date est.	Description/notes
Inmaculada Concepción		Bayamón		
Nuestra Señora, Madre del Salvador		Río Abajo		
Nuestra Señora, Madre de la Divina Providencia		Arenas		
Nuestra Señora de Fátima		Rabanal		
Nuestra Señora de la Milagrosa		Bayamón		
Nuestra Señora del Carmen		Cidra Pueblo	1813	Main town church of Cidra, located at the Plaza Francisco M. Zeno. The first church was heavily damaged during the 1867 earthquake, and the current one, designed by state architect Pedro Cobreros, was rebuilt in 1895.
Nuestra Señora del Carmen		Rabanal		
Nuestra Señora del Rosario		Bayamón		
Nuestra Señora del Rosario		Cidra Pueblo		
San José		Certenejas		
San Martín de Porres		Beatriz		
Santa Teresita del Niño Jesús		Monte Llano		

== Municipality of Comerío ==
Church name	Image	Location	Date est.	Description/notes
Sagrado Corazón de Jesús		Cedrito		
San José		Palomas		
Santo Cristo de la Salud		Comerío Pueblo	1826	Main town church of Comerío, located on the Plaza de los Trovadores. The parish was founded together with the town in 1826 but the current church dates to the 1970s.
Virgen del Carmen		Piñas		

== Municipality of Gurabo ==
Church name	Image	Location	Date est.	Description/notes
Beato Carlos Manuel Rodríguez		Mamey		
Divino Niño Jesús		Rincón	1995	
San Francisco Javier		Navarro		
San José		Gurabo Pueblo	1821	Main town parish of Gurabo, located on the main town square. The current parish was founded in 1822 at the site of a former rural hermitage.

== Municipality of Juncos ==
Church name	Image	Location	Date est.	Description/notes
Cristo Redentor		Mamey		
Inmaculada Concepción		Juncos Pueblo	1797	Main town parish of Juncos, located on Plaza Antonio R. Barceló. The current church building dates to 1867, with major restoration work done in 2011.
Buen Pastor		Ceiba Norte		
María, Madre de la Iglesia		Valenciano Abajo		
San José		Lirios		
San Juan Bautista		Valenciano Arriba		

== Municipality of Las Piedras ==
Church name	Image	Location	Date est.	Description/notes
Espíritu Santo		Quebrada Arenas		
Inmaculada Concepción		Las Piedras Pueblo	1801	Main town parish of Las Piedras, located across from the main town square. Previous church iterations destroyed by hurricanes existed in 1825 and 1868. The current church building dates to the mid 20th century.
Jesús de Nazaret		Collores		
Nuestra Señora de Fátima		Tejas		
Nuestra Señora del Perpetuo Socorro		Montones		
San Juan Bautista		El Río	1971	
San Juan Bautista		Montones		
Santa María, Madre de la Divina Providencia		Tejas		
Santa Teresita del Niño Jesús		Montones		

== Municipality of Maunabo ==
Church name	Image	Location	Date est.	Description/notes
Nuestra Señora de la Providencia		Calzada		
San Antonio de Padua		Emajagua		
San Isidro Labrador y Santa María de la Cabeza		Maunabo Pueblo	1799	Main town parish of Maunabo, located on the main town square. The first church suffered heavy damages from the 1867 earthquake and the 1928 San Felipe hurricane and was completely rebuilt in 1930 to its current iteration.

== Municipality of Naranjito ==
Church name	Image	Location	Date est.	Description/notes
La Milagrosa		Anones		
María Auxiliadora		Cedro Arriba		
Nuestra Señora de la Monserrate		Guadiana		
Nuestra Señora del Carmen		Lomas		
Sagrado Corazón de Jesús		Achiote		
San Antonio de Padua		Cedro Arriba		
San José		Cedro Abajo		
San Judas Tadeo		Lomas		
San Miguel Arcángel		Naranjito Pueblo	1831	Main town church of Naranjito, located on its main town square. The current church was built in the 20th century.
San Vicente de Paúl		Nuevo		

== Municipality of San Lorenzo ==
Church name	Image	Location	Date est.	Description/notes
Cristo Redentor		Cerro Gordo		
María, Madre de la Iglesia		Quebrada Arenas		
Nuestra Señora de las Mercedes		Quemados		
Nuestra Señora de las Mercedes de San Miguel		San Lorenzo Pueblo	1737	Main town parish of San Lorenzo, located on its main town square. The current Neoclassical church building, designed by Puerto Rico state architect Pedro Cobreros, dates to 1887.
Nuestra Señora de los Buenos Aires		Quemados		
Nuestra Señora de Lourdes		Florida		
Nuestra Señora del Carmen		Jagual		
Sagrado Corazón y los Doce Apóstoles		Espino	1986	
San Francisco de Asís		Quebrada Arenas		
San José		Quebrada Arenas		
Santa Mónica		Florida		
Santa Teresita de Jesús		Quebrada Honda		
Santiago Apóstol		Quemados		
Virgen del Carmen		Espino	1985	Diocesan Marian shrine and sanctuary to Our Lady of Mount Carmel within Carite State Forest, officially founded by the diocese in 1985 at the site of a previously unrecognized shrine associated with local folklore and which has attracted pilgrims since the 19th century.

== Municipality of Yabucoa ==
Church name	Image	Location	Date est.	Description/notes
Corpus Christi		Tejas		
La Milagrosa		Calabazas		
Nuestra Señora del Carmen		Playa		
Nuestra Señora del Perpetuo Socorro		Playa		
Sagrada Familia		Guayabota		
Sagrado Corazón de Jesús		Jácanas		
San Antonio Abad		Calabazas		
Santos Ángeles Custodios		Yabucoa Pueblo	1893	Main town parish of Yabucoa, located on its main town square. The parish was officially founded at the site of a former wooden hermitage. It sustained heavy damaged by 1956 Santa Clara hurricane and rebuilt into its current Brutalist iteration in 1968. Served by the Benedictines.
