= Dave Rosello =

Puerto Rican baseball player (1949–2026)

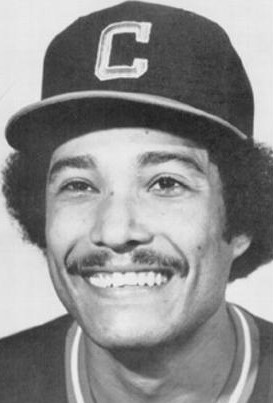
- Infielder
- Born: June 26, 1949; Mayagüez, Puerto Rico
- Died: September 30, 2026 (aged 77); Kissimmee, Florida, U.S.
- Batted: Right Threw: Right

MLB debut
- September 10, 1972, for the Chicago Cubs

Last MLB appearance
- October 5, 1981, for the Cleveland Indians

MLB statistics
- Batting average: .236
- Home runs: 10
- Runs batted in: 76
- Stats at Baseball Reference

Teams
- Chicago Cubs (1972–1977); Cleveland Indians (1979–1981)

David Rosello Rodríguez (June 26, 1949 – September 30, 2026) was a Puerto Rican professional baseball infielder. He played all or part of nine seasons in Major League Baseball (MLB) between 1972 and 1981, for the Chicago Cubs and Cleveland Indians.

== Professional career ==
Rosello signed with the Cubs in 1968 after graduating from Eugenio Maria de Hostos School in Mayagüez, Puerto Rico, where in addition to baseball he played basketball and participated in track and field.

Rosello debuted in the minors with the Class A Quincy Cubs in 1969. He made his Cubs debut with a five-game cameo in 1972 and then bounced between the Double A Wichita Aeros and the Cubs the next three seasons. At Wichita, Rosello excelled in the field and was named a AA All-Star in 1972, 1973, and 1975.

With veteran Don Kessinger being traded to the St. Louis Cardinals after the 1975 season, Rosello began the 1976 season as the Cubs starting shortstop. He started 68 of the 91 games he appeared in the that season, getting a career-high 227 at-bats and drawing 41 walks. Rosello was back in the utility spot in 1977 and then was shipped to the Cleveland Indians in the offseason for two minor leaguers.

Rosello was back in the minors in 1978 with Clevland's Triple A affiliate, the Portland Beavers and then spent the next three seasons primarily coming off the bench for the Indians. After another season in Triple A in 1982, Rosello retired from baseball.

== Personal ==
Rosello died on September 30, 2026, at the age of 76.

== See also ==
- List of Major League Baseball players from Puerto Rico
