= Palo Hincado Site =

Archaeological site in Barranquitas municipality, Puerto Rico

- U.S. National Register of Historic Places
- Location: Address restricted
- Nearest city: Barranquitas, Puerto Rico
- MPS: Ball Court/Plaza Sites of Puerto Rico and the U.S. Virgin Islands MPS
- NRHP reference No.: 99001021
- Added to NRHP: September 2, 1999

Palo Hincado Site, also known as BA-1, is an archaeological site in or near Barranquitas, Puerto Rico. The site includes a plaza, a 33 metres (108 ft) by 15 metres (49 ft) ball court, and petroglyphs. Reportedly a number of petroglyphs on stones around the plaza and ball court) have been removed by collectors.

The site was visited by archaeologist Irving Rouse in 1936.

It was listed on the National Register of Historic Places in 1999.

Palo Hincado is also the name of a barrio (neighborhood) of Barranquitas.

== See also ==
- National Register of Historic Places listings in central Puerto Rico
