= Aguayo Aldea Vocational High School =

Historic school in Caguas, Puerto Rico

- U.S. National Register of Historic Places
- Puerto Rico Historic Sites and Zones
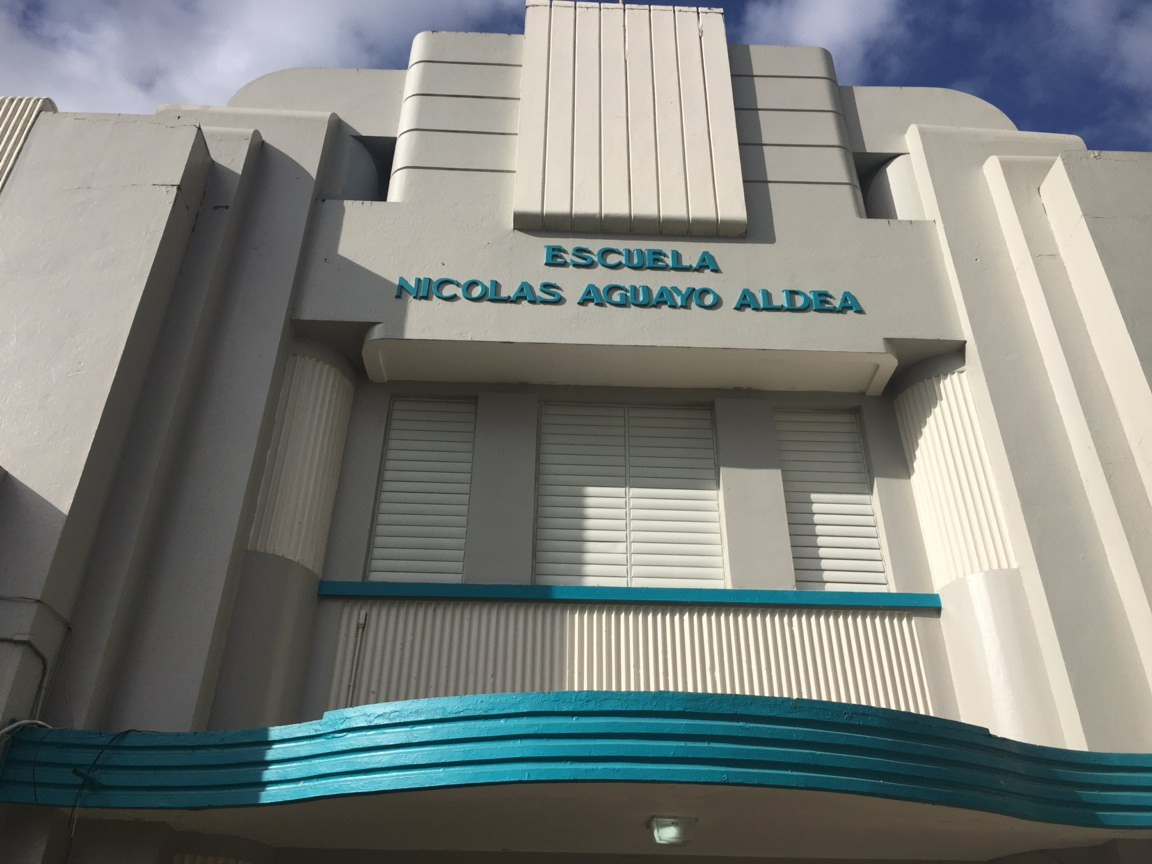
- Facade of the school in 2018

- Location within Puerto Rico
- Location: Junction of San Juan and Principal Streets, Caguas, Puerto Rico
- Coordinates: 18°13′56″N 66°1′49″W
- Built: 1939
- Architects: Lizardi & Diaz Diez, Manuel Gonzales Seijo
- Architectural style: Art Deco
- NRHP reference No.: 87001311
- RNSZH No.: 2000-(RCE)-21-JP-SH

Significant dates
- Added to NRHP: August 4, 1987
- Designated RNSZH: December 21, 2000

The Aguayo Aldea Vocational High School (Spanish: Escuela Superior Vocacional Aguayo Aldea), popularly known as La Vocacional, is a historic school in Caguas, Puerto Rico, named after Nicolás Aguayo Aldea, a Puerto Rican writer and politician from the 19th century. The Art Deco building dates to 1939 and was designed by architects Lizardi & Díaz Diez.

Although originally an elementary and intermediary school, La Vocacional became a high school in 1960. The school building was added to the National Register of Historic Places on August 4, 1987, and on the Puerto Rico Register of Historic Sites and Zones in 2000, and it still functions as a vocational school.

== See also ==
- National Register of Historic Places listings in central Puerto Rico
