= Las Minas =

Las Minas (Spanish, 'The Mines') may refer to:

== Populated places ==
- Las Minas District, Panama
  - Las Minas, Herrera
- Las Minas, Veracruz, Mexico

== Natural features ==
- Cerro Las Minas, the highest mountain in Honduras
- Las Minas Creek, a river in Jalisco, Mexico
- Río de la Mina (Coamo, Puerto Rico), a river in Puerto Rico
- Río de la Mina (Río Grande, Puerto Rico), a river in Puerto Rico
- Las Minas, the name of several rivers of Chile

== Archaeological sites ==
- Cerro de las Minas, a Mixtec site in Oaxaca, Mexico
