= National Register of Historic Places listings in Puerto Rico =

This is a list of properties and historic districts that are listed on the National Register of Historic Places (NRHP) in Puerto Rico, not to be confused with the Puerto Rico Register of Historic Sites and Zones. There are more than 375 listings in Puerto Rico, with one or more listing in each of Puerto Rico's 78 municipalities.

Puerto Rico's municipalities

For convenience, the list has been divided into six regions:

- National Register of Historic Places listings in western Puerto Rico
- National Register of Historic Places listings in southern Puerto Rico
- National Register of Historic Places listings in northern Puerto Rico
- National Register of Historic Places listings in central Puerto Rico
- National Register of Historic Places listings in eastern Puerto Rico
- National Register of Historic Places listings in San Juan, Puerto Rico

== Current listings by municipality ==
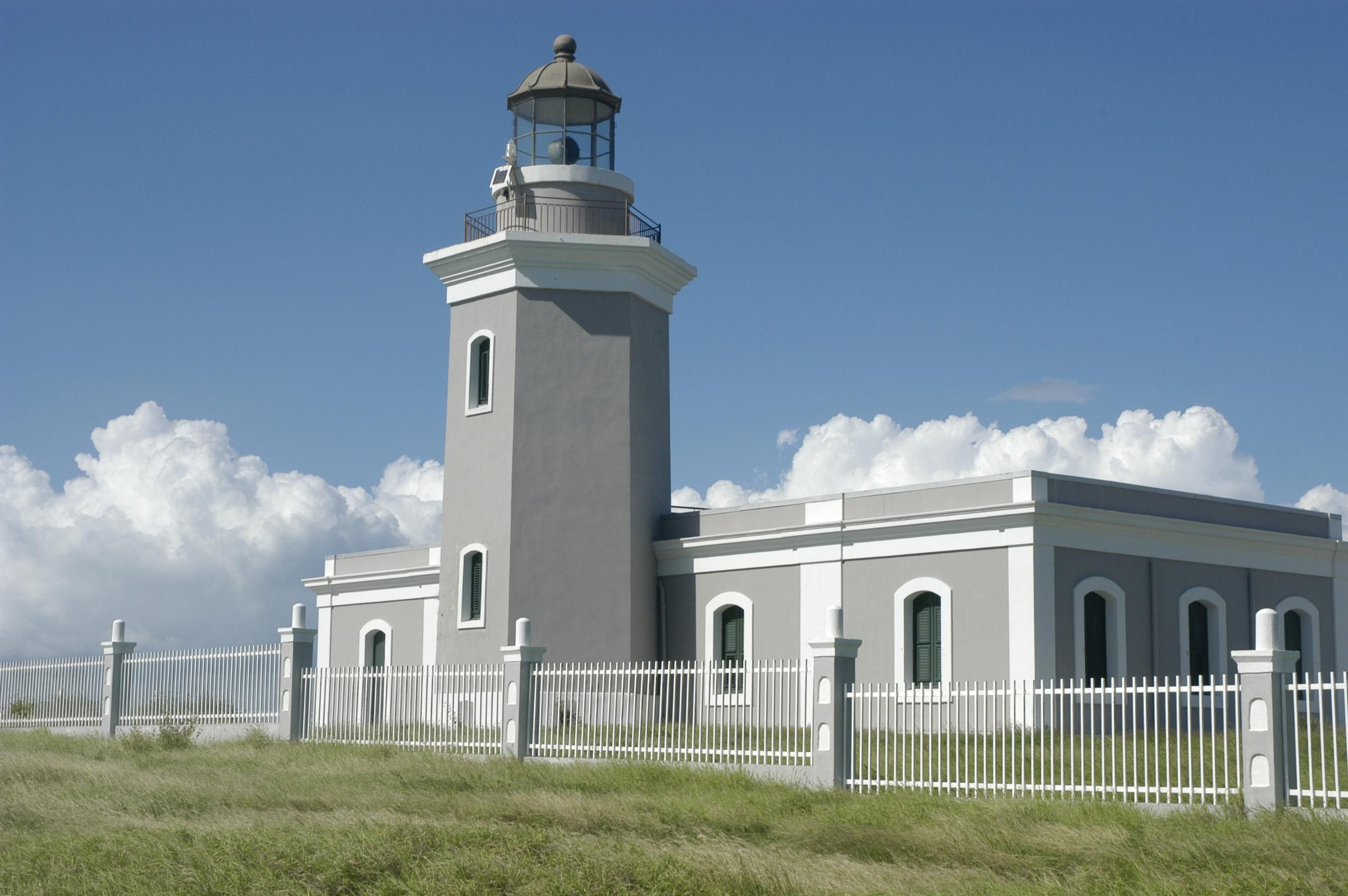
Faro de los Morrillos de Cabo Rojo, in Cabo Rojo

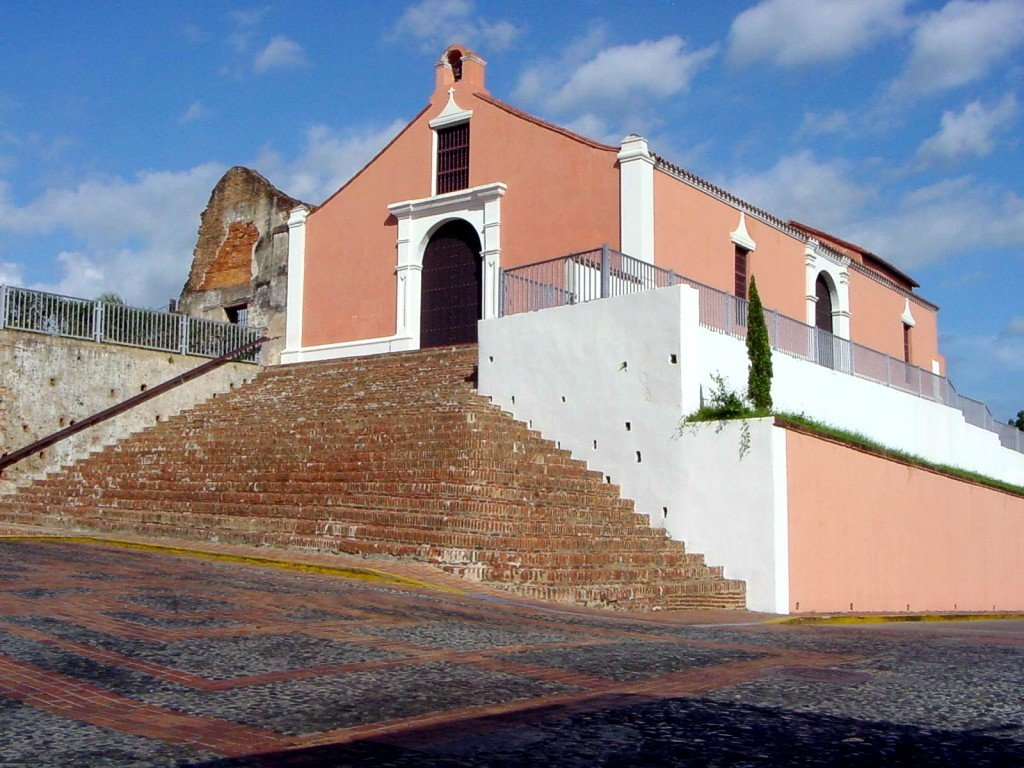
Convento de Porta Coeli, in San Germán

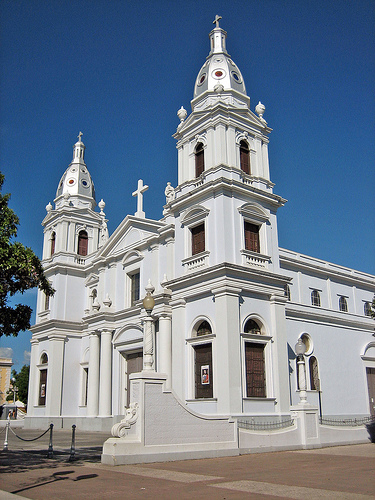
Cathedral Nuestra Senora de Guadalupe of Ponce, in Ponce

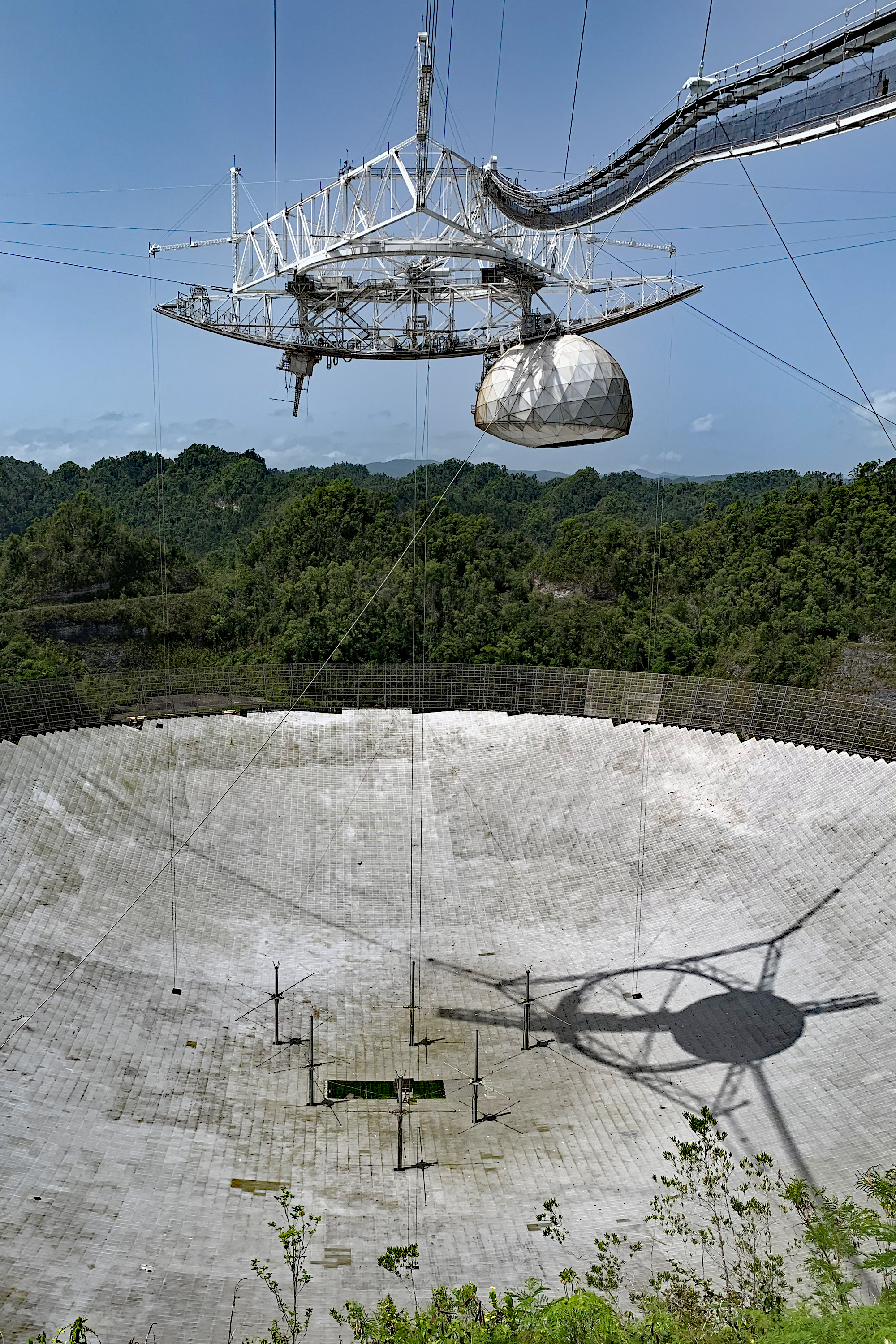
National Astronomy and Ionosphere Center (collapsed in late 2020), in Arecibo

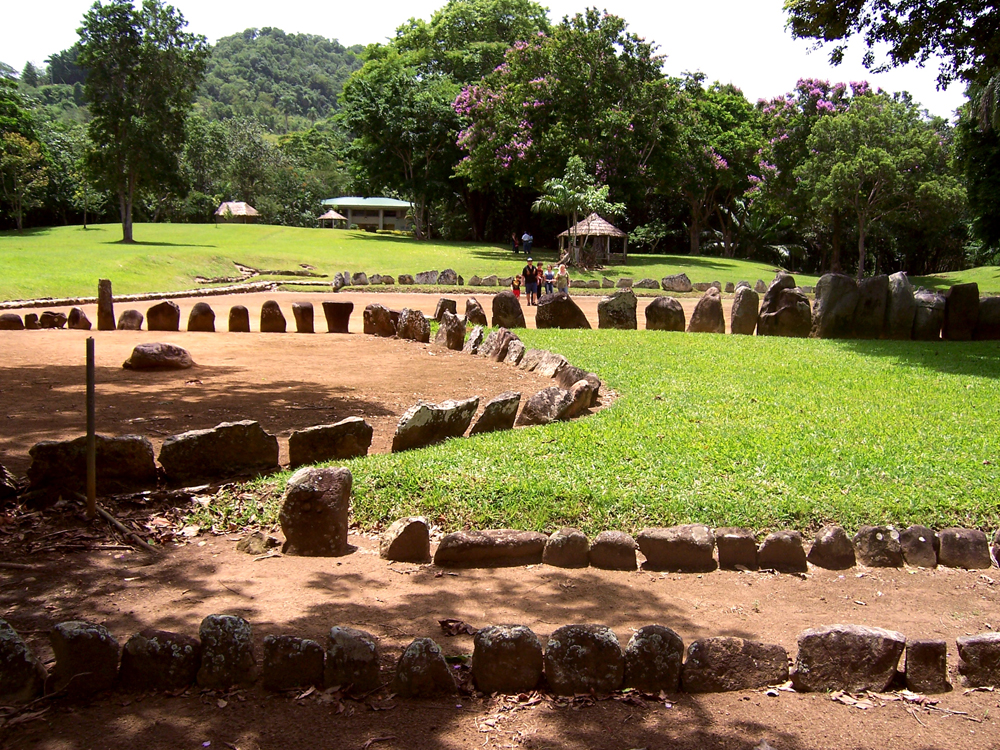
Caguana Ceremonial Ball Courts Site, in Utuado

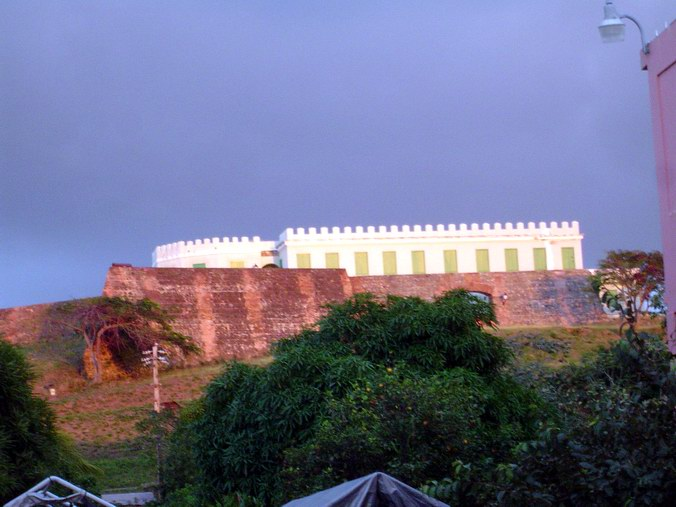
Fuerte de Vieques, in Vieques

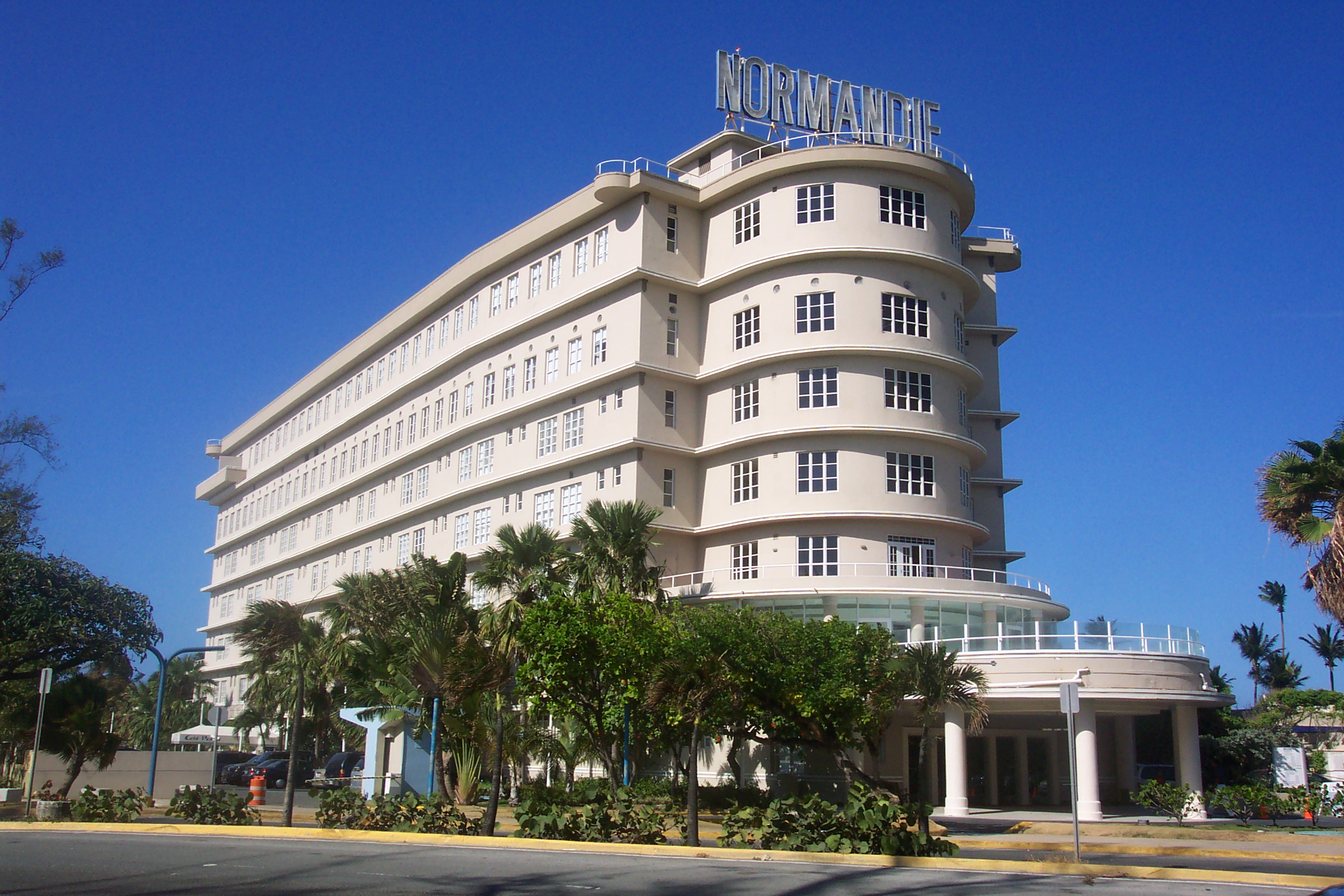
Streamline Moderne Normandie Hotel, in San Juan

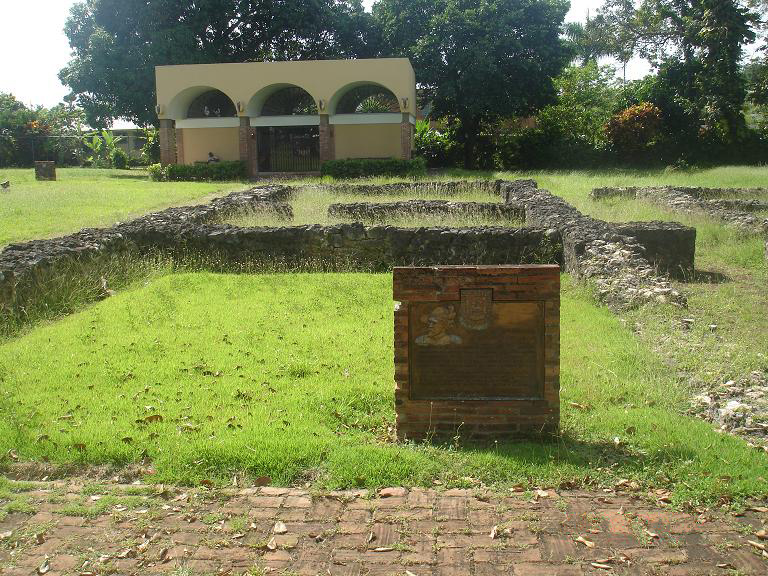
Historic Caparra, in Guaynabo

	Municipality	Regional list	# of Listings
1	Adjuntas	Central	5
2	Aguada	Western	1
3	Aguadilla	Western	9
4	Aguas Buenas	Central	1
5	Aibonito	Central	4
6	Añasco	Western	2
7	Arecibo	Northern	15
8	Arroyo	Eastern	1
9	Barceloneta	Northern	1
10	Barranquitas	Central	3
11	Bayamón	Northern	7
12	Cabo Rojo	Western	5
13	Caguas	Central	7
14	Camuy	Northern	3
15	Canóvanas	Eastern	1
16	Carolina	Eastern	3
17	Cataño	Northern	2
18	Cayey	Central	7
19	Ceiba	Eastern	1
20	Ciales	Central	1
21	Cidra	Central	5
22	Coamo	Central	8
23	Comerío	Central	3
24	Corozal	Central	1
25	Culebra	Eastern	1
26	Dorado	Northern	6
27	Fajardo	Eastern	3
28	Florida	Northern	1
29	Guánica	Western	4
30	Guayama	Southern	6
31	Guayanilla	Southern	2
32	Guaynabo	Northern	3
33	Gurabo	Central	1
34	Hatillo	Northern	1
35	Hormigueros	Western	4
36	Humacao	Eastern	7
37	Isabela	Northern	1
38	Jayuya	Central	1
39	Juana Díaz	Southern	4
40	Juncos	Central	2
41	Lajas	Western	2
42	Lares	Central	2
43	Las Marías	Central	1
44	Las Piedras	Eastern	1
45	Loíza	Eastern	3
46	Luquillo	Eastern	1
47	Manatí	Northern	5
48	Maricao	Central	3
49	Maunabo	Eastern	2
50	Mayagüez	Western	19
51	Moca	Western	2
52	Morovis	Central	1
53	Naguabo	Eastern	4
54	Naranjito	Central	2
55	Orocovis	Central	1
56	Patillas	Eastern	1
57	Peñuelas	Southern	1
58	Ponce	Southern	47
59	Quebradillas	Northern	2
60	Rincón	Western	2
61	Río Grande	Eastern	5
62	Sabana Grande	Western	6
63	Salinas	Southern	1
64	San Germán	Western	8
65	San Juan	San Juan	68
66	San Lorenzo	Central	2
67	San Sebastián	Northern	1
68	Santa Isabel	Southern	2
69	Toa Alta	Northern	1
70	Toa Baja	Northern	4
71	Trujillo Alto	Central	1
72	Utuado	Central	4
73	Vega Alta	Northern	1
74	Vega Baja	Northern	4
75	Vieques	Eastern	31
76	Villalba	Central	1
77	Yabucoa	Eastern	1
78	Yauco	Southern	9
(duplicates)			(12) (Note: Several historic resources in Puerto Rico span the boundaries between multiple municipalities and are included in each municipality's list: Arenas Bridge: Cayey and Cidra; La Liendre Bridge: Cayey and Cidra; Plata Bridge: Bayamón and Naranjito; Puente de Añasco: Añasco and Mayagüez; San Juan National Historic Site: San Juan and Toa Baja; Silva Bridge: Hormigueros and Cabo Rojo; Carretera Central: Caguas, Cidra, Cayey, Aibonito, Coamo, and Juana Díaz; Carretera 4: Cayey and Guayama)
Total			383

== See also ==
- List of lighthouses in Puerto Rico
- List of bridges on the National Register of Historic Places in Puerto Rico
- Puerto Rico Register of Historic Sites and Zones
