= General Méndez Vigo Bridge =

Historic bridge in Coamo, Puerto Rico

- U.S. National Register of Historic Places
- Puerto Rico Historic Sites and Zones
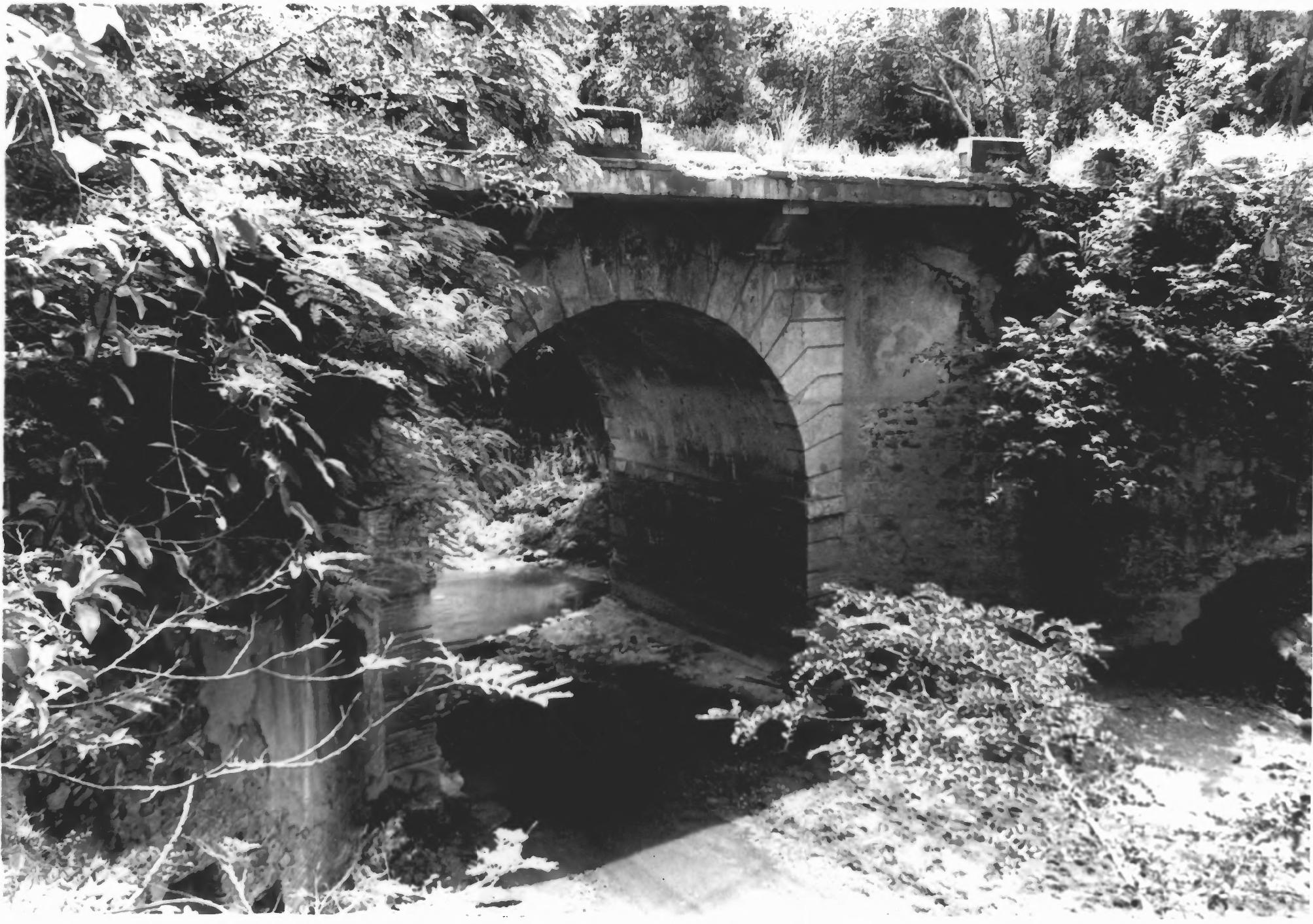

- Location within Puerto Rico
- Nearest city: Coamo, Puerto Rico
- Coordinates: 18°03′50″N 66°22′27″W
- Built: 1862, 1898
- Built by: US Corps of Engineers
- Architectural style: brick barrel vault
- MPS: Historic Bridges of Puerto Rico MPS
- NRHP reference No.: 95000839
- RNSZH No.: 2001-(RS)-23-JP-SH

Significant dates
- Added to NRHP: July 19, 1995
- Designated RNSZH: May 16, 2001

The General Méndez Vigo Bridge is a brick barrel vault bridge that brings what is now Puerto Rico Highway 14 across the Río Las Minas near Coamo, Puerto Rico. Also known as Bridge #173 and as Puente Rio las Minas, it was built in the year 1862 as part of Puerto Rico's Carretera Central. The bridge is historically significant for its association with the U.S. Army Corps of Engineers and its role in the Spanish–American War of 1898. It is also the only surviving masonry bridge in the southern section of the Carretera Central.

In the Puerto Rican Campaign, American forces landed in the south of Puerto Rico and attacked up the Carretera Central. This bridge, like some others, was destroyed by Spanish troops under Commander Rafael Martinez-Illescas to delay the American troops, which worked; a battalion of the 2nd Wisconsin Volunteer Regiment, part of a U.S. Army column commanded by Major General James H. Wilson, approaching from Ponce, Puerto Rico, was held up. The Wisconsin troops subsequently participated in a pincer movement at the Battle of Coamo in which Martinez-Illescas was killed.

The destroyed arch was rebuilt in 1898 by the US Corps of Engineers. Keystones of the arch "embody its history": one side shows a castle, the symbol of the U.S. Army Corps of Engineers, and the other provides inscription that it was reconstructed in 1898 by the First Regiment of the Fifth Battalion of the Corps. The arch is otherwise decorated by geometrical designs in relief. Abutments of the bridge are from the 1862 original construction.

The bridge is named for General Santiago Mendez Vigo, who was governor of Puerto Rico, for Spain, during 1840 to 1844. It was designed by engineer Timoteo Luberza and cost 15,405 pesos.

It is located near kilometer 30.4 of Route 14.
