= Casa Blanca (Coamo, Puerto Rico) =

Historic house in Coamo, Puerto Rico

- La Casa Blanca
- U.S. National Register of Historic Places
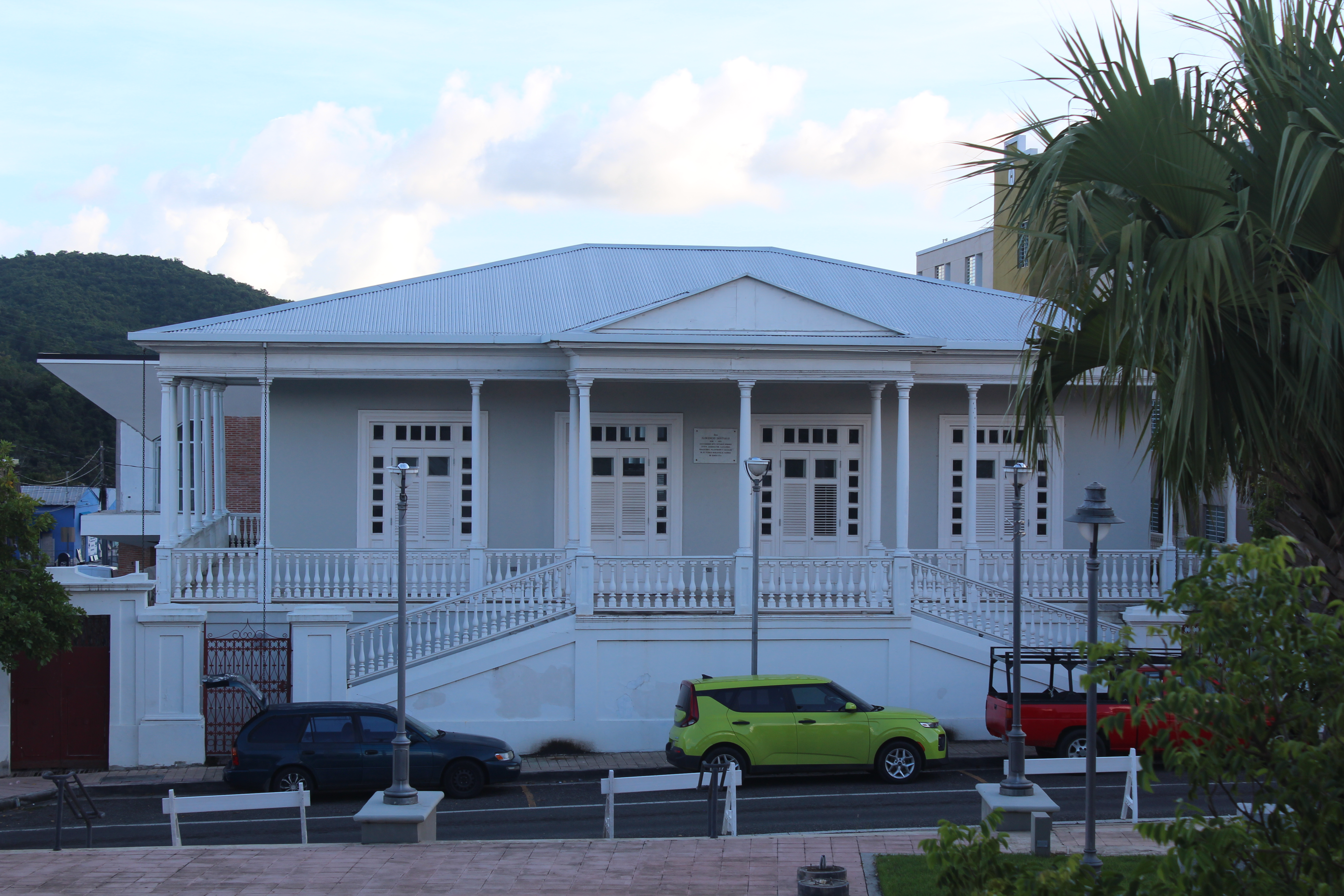
- La Casa Blanca in 2023.

- Location within Puerto Rico
- Location: 17 José I. Quintón Street Coamo, Puerto Rico
- Coordinates: 18°4′48″N 66°21′22″W
- Built: 1865
- Architect: Raymundo Camprubi
- Architectural style: Criollo
- NRHP reference No.: 92000379
- Added to NRHP: April 28, 1992

La Casa Blanca (Spanish for 'white house'), also known as the Elfrén Bernier Residence, is a Spanish creole-style historic residence building located at 17 José I. Quintón Street in Coamo Pueblo (downtown Coamo), the historical and administrative center of the Puerto Rican municipality of Coamo. The house dates to 1865 with further modifications made in 1874. The building was added to the United States National Register of Historic Places on April 28, 1992.
