= La Piedra Escrita =

Archaeological site in Puerto Rico

- U.S. National Register of Historic Places
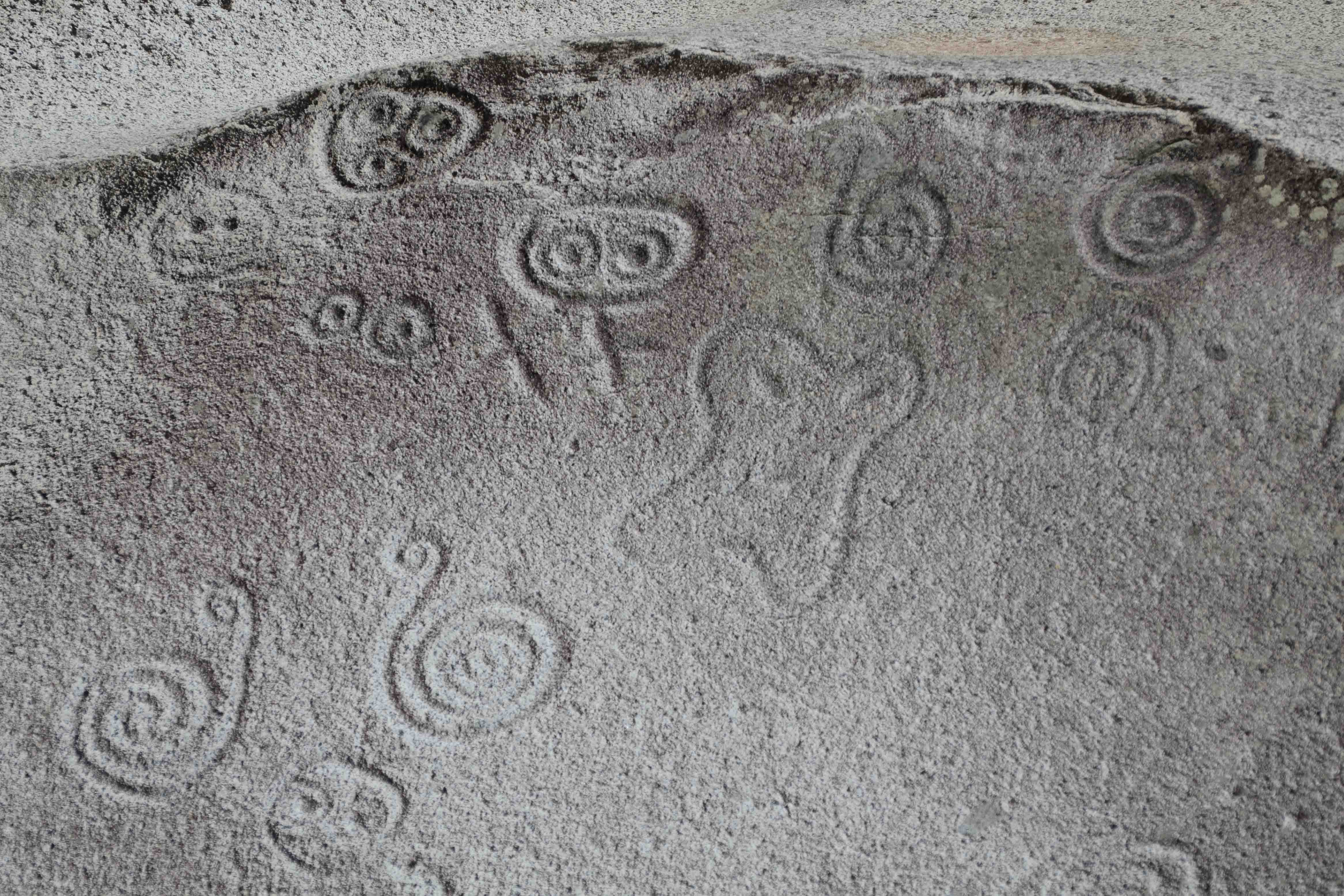
- Close up of some of the petroglyphs.

- Location within Puerto Rico
- Location: Coabey, Jayuya, Puerto Rico
- Coordinates: 18°13′02″N 66°34′23″W
- NRHP reference No.: 02001720
- Added to NRHP: January 15, 2003

La Piedra Escrita (Spanish for 'the written stone') is a rock art site consisting of a large granite boulder containing pictographs located in the Saliente River in Coabey, Jayuya in central Puerto Rico. The petroglyphs have become popularly associated with the Taíno people and have been widely reproduced in popular art, and the site has become a popular tourist attraction. The site was added to the United States National Register of Historic Places in 2003 due to its importance as a prime example of prehistoric rock art in Puerto Rico.

The site now contains a recreational area that provides access to the petroglyphs and the river, which is popular for swimming.

== Gallery ==
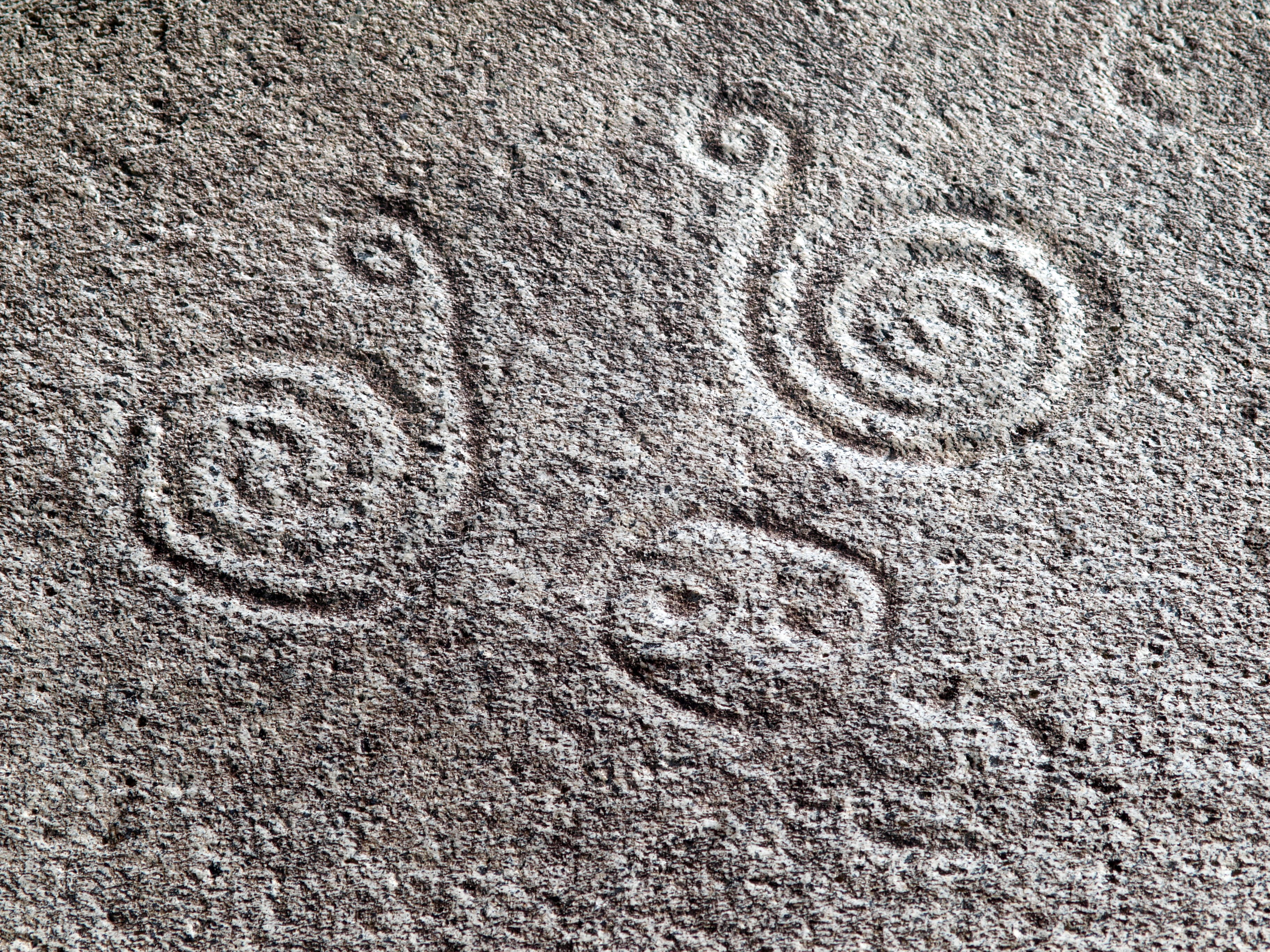

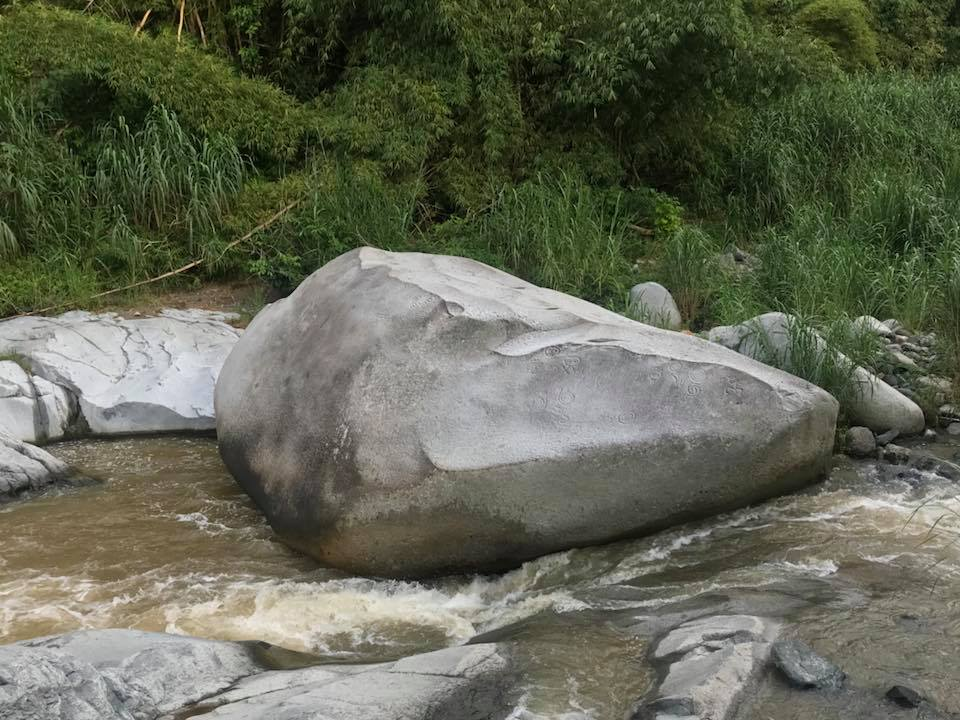

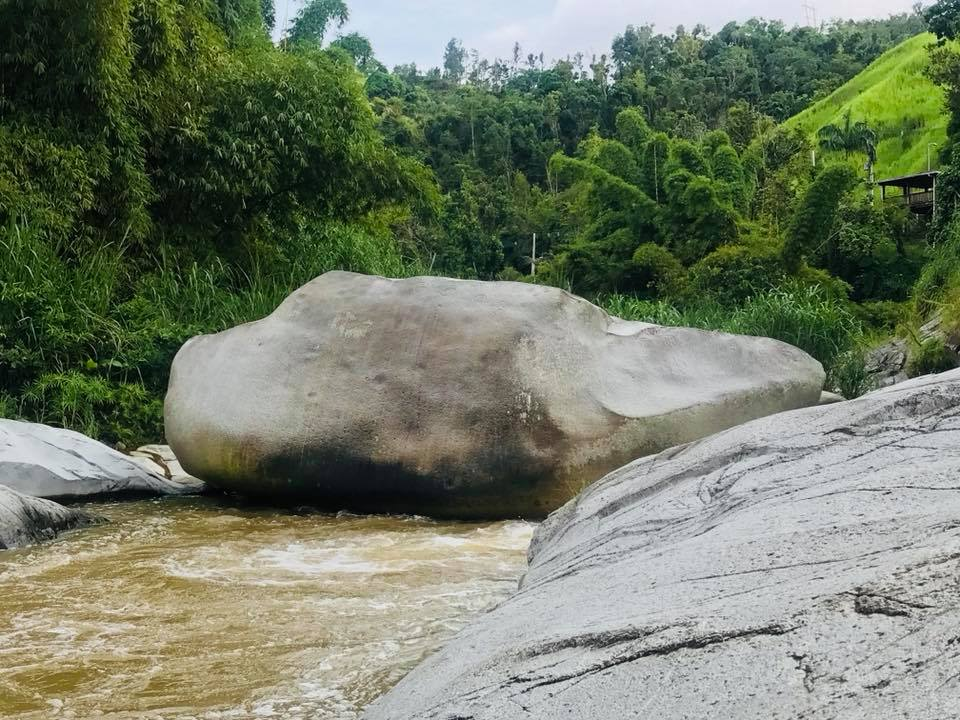
