= La Bolero =

- U.S. National Register of Historic Places
- Location within Puerto Rico
- Location: Highway 173, km 0.5 Ceiba, Cidra, Puerto Rico
- Coordinates: 18°10′50″N 66°9′41″W
- Built: 1961
- Architect: René O. Ramírez
- Architectural style: Modern
- NRHP reference No.: 12000584
- Added to NRHP: August 28, 2012

La Bolero Manufacturing Plant (Spanish: Fábrica La Bolero) is a historic factory building located in the Ceiba barrio of Cidra, Puerto Rico. It adjoins two other similar, prototypical buildings in an industrial park located north of downtown Cidra. The building was added to the United States National Register of Historic Places in 2012.

La Bolero is a reinforced concrete building, accommodated in a 4,400 square meters area. Its design adheres to one of the prototypical models built by the Puerto Rico Industrial Development Corporation (PRIDCO). Puerto Rican architect René O. Ramírez, a graduate from Cornell University, designed the industrial prototype subscribing key tenets of the Modern Movement regarding horizontality, asymmetry, frugal expression, and the use of concrete, among others. The building was erected originally in 1961 as an all-purpose facility whose open plan and electrical and mechanical capabilities would serve well any prospective tenants, regardless of their respective trades. The building design predated its programming. As built, the plant follows the architectural standards established by PRIDCO by the late 1940s for promoting the island's industrialization through the construction of physical facilities to be rented to local and foreign investors. The building was first rented to the Lewis J. Kurlan Corporation, which occupied it from November 30, 1962, to June 23, 1964. The next tenant was La Bolero, from March 9, 1965, to 2002.
