= Río Matón Bridge =

Historic place located in Cayey, Puerto Rico

- U.S. National Register of Historic Places
- Puerto Rico Historic Sites and Zones
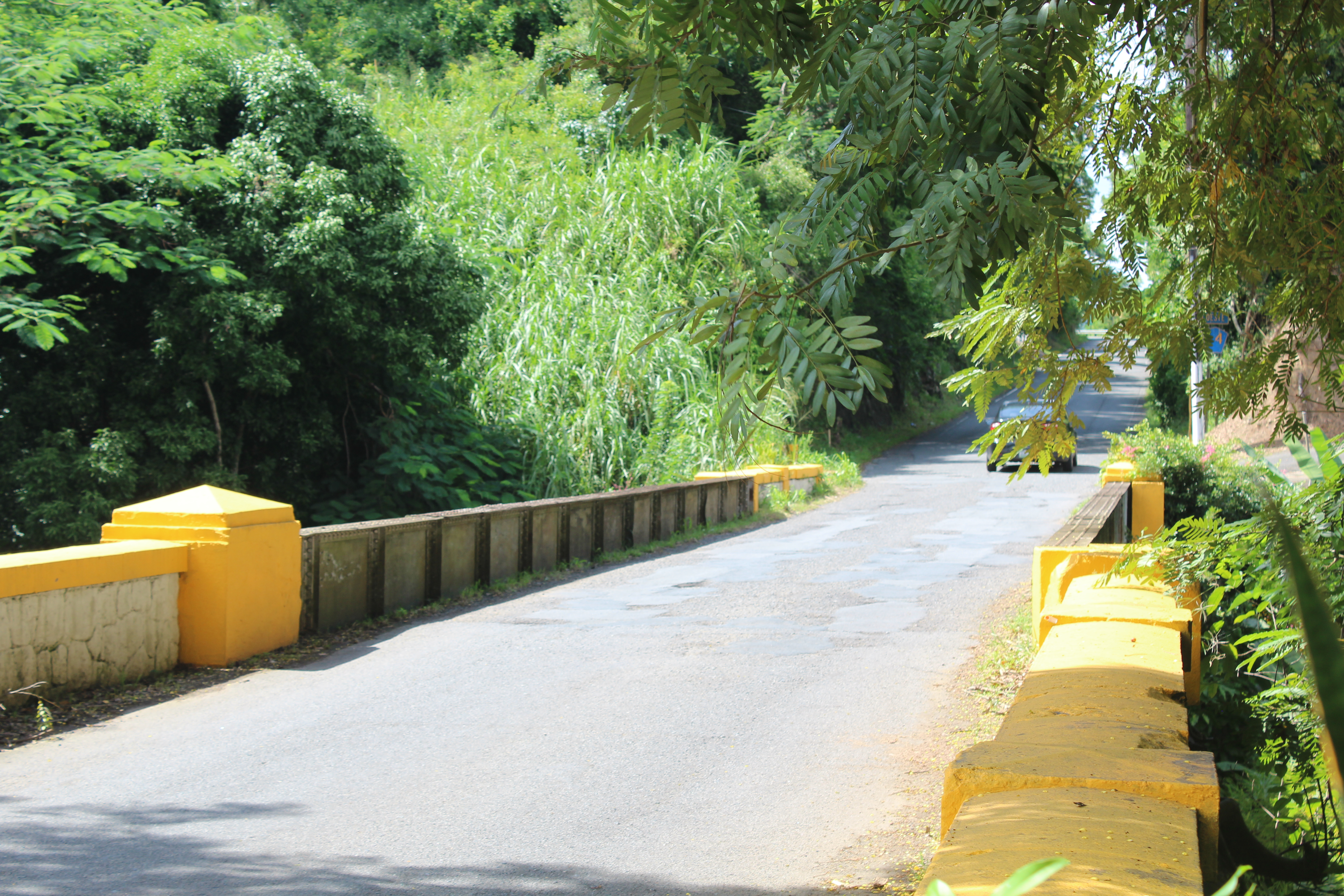
- Río Matón Bridge looking west

- Location within Puerto Rico
- Nearest city: Cayey, Puerto Rico
- Coordinates: 18°08′23″N 66°12′39″W
- Area: less than one acre
- Built: 1886
- Engineer: Manuel Lopez-Bayo
- Architectural style: lateral solid web girder
- MPS: Historic Bridges of Puerto Rico MPS
- NRHP reference No.: 95000841
- RNSZH No.: 2000-(RCE)-21-JP-SH

Significant dates
- Added to NRHP: July 19, 1995
- Designated RNSZH: December 21, 2000

The Río Matón Bridge, in Matón Abajo, a barrio of Cayey, Puerto Rico, was built in 1886. It was listed on the National Register of Historic Places in 1995 and on the Puerto Rico Register of Historic Sites and Zones in 2000.

It is a lateral solid web girder bridge spanning Río Matón. It was built as part of the Carretera Central. Its iron span was designed by Spanish engineer Manuel Lopez-Bayo and was brought from Europe. Its purchase cost was 11,105 francs.

It carries Highway 14, at km 63.2.

It has also been known as Bridge #1. Its designer was engineer Manuel Lopez-Bayo. The bridge entered the NRHP because of its architecture and engineering and because it demonstrates an important time in the history of Puerto Rico.
