= Blanco Bridge =

Historic bridge in Utuado, Puerto Rico

- U.S. National Register of Historic Places
- Puerto Rico Historic Sites and Zones
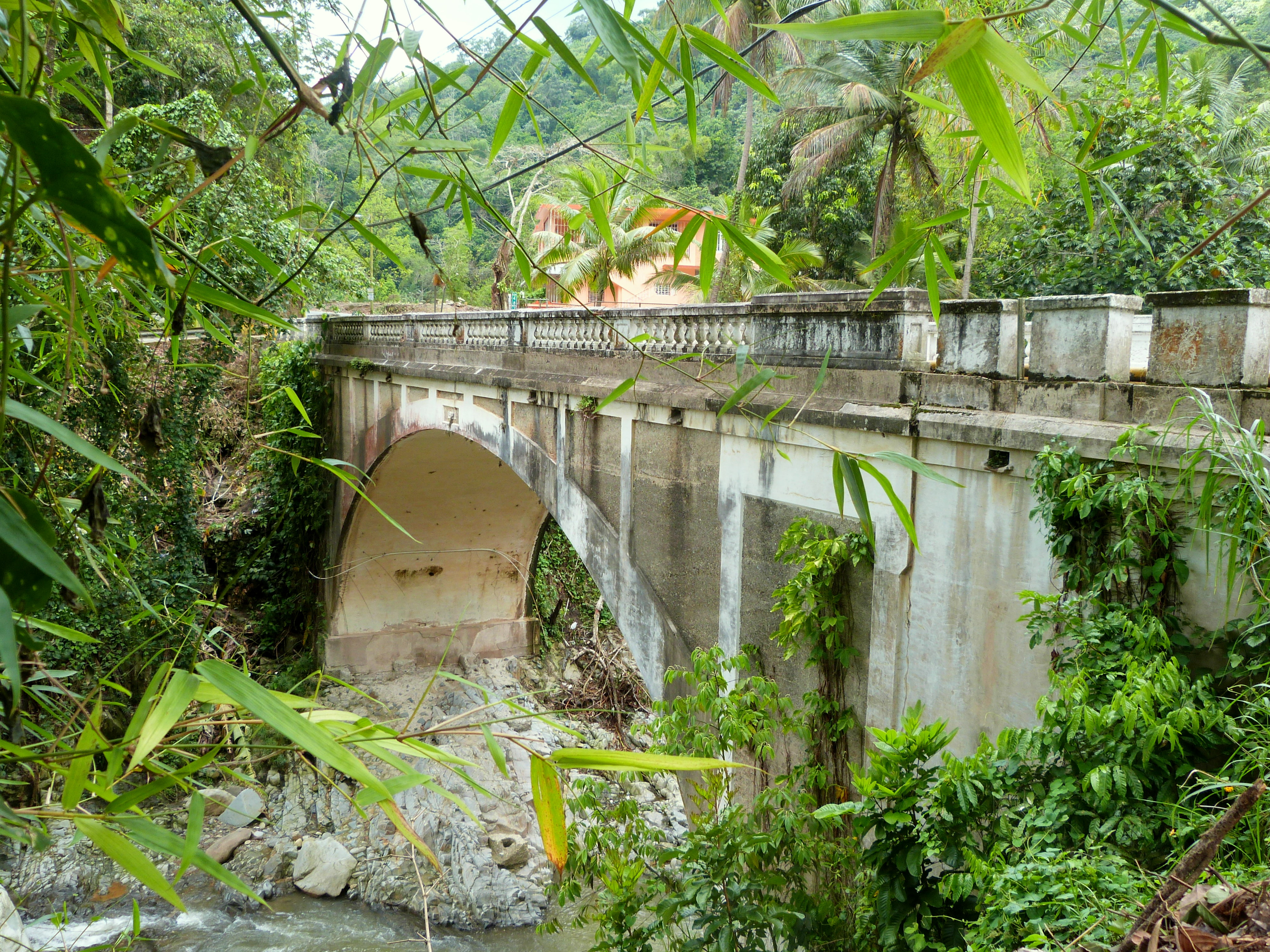
- Blanco Bridge

- Location within Puerto Rico
- Nearest city: Utuado, Puerto Rico
- Coordinates: 18.23°N 66.717222°W
- Area: less than one acre
- Built: 1924
- Architect: Raphael Nevares
- Architectural style: elliptical concrete arch
- NRHP reference No.: 95000837
- RNSZH No.: 2000-(RC)-22-JP-SH

Significant dates
- Added to NRHP: July 19, 1995
- Designated RNSZH: March 15, 2001

Blanco Bridge or Bridge 152 (Puente Blanco in Spanish) was built in 1924, on Puerto Rico Highway 10 at km 48.1 in Arenas, a barrio of Utuado in Puerto Rico. PR-10 at this location connects the towns / municipalities of Utuado and Adjuntas. It's named Puente Blanco (white bridge) because it was painted white for decades. The concrete bridge rises 33 feet over the Pellejas River between Adjuntas and Utuado. The total length of the bridge is 20.5 meters and its width is 4.9 meters. The bridge designer was Rafael Nevares and Martín Aparicio was the builder. The bridge which cost $23,796 was important for these inland coffee municipalities. The bridge was added to the US National Register of Historic Places on July 19, 1995. The bridge met the requirements for its design and craftsmanship as well as for its significance to the historical period between 1924 - 1944 in Puerto Rico when coffee production was an important part of its economy. The bridge helped improve exchange and communication between nearby communities working in coffee production.

== Gallery ==
Views of Blanco Bridge

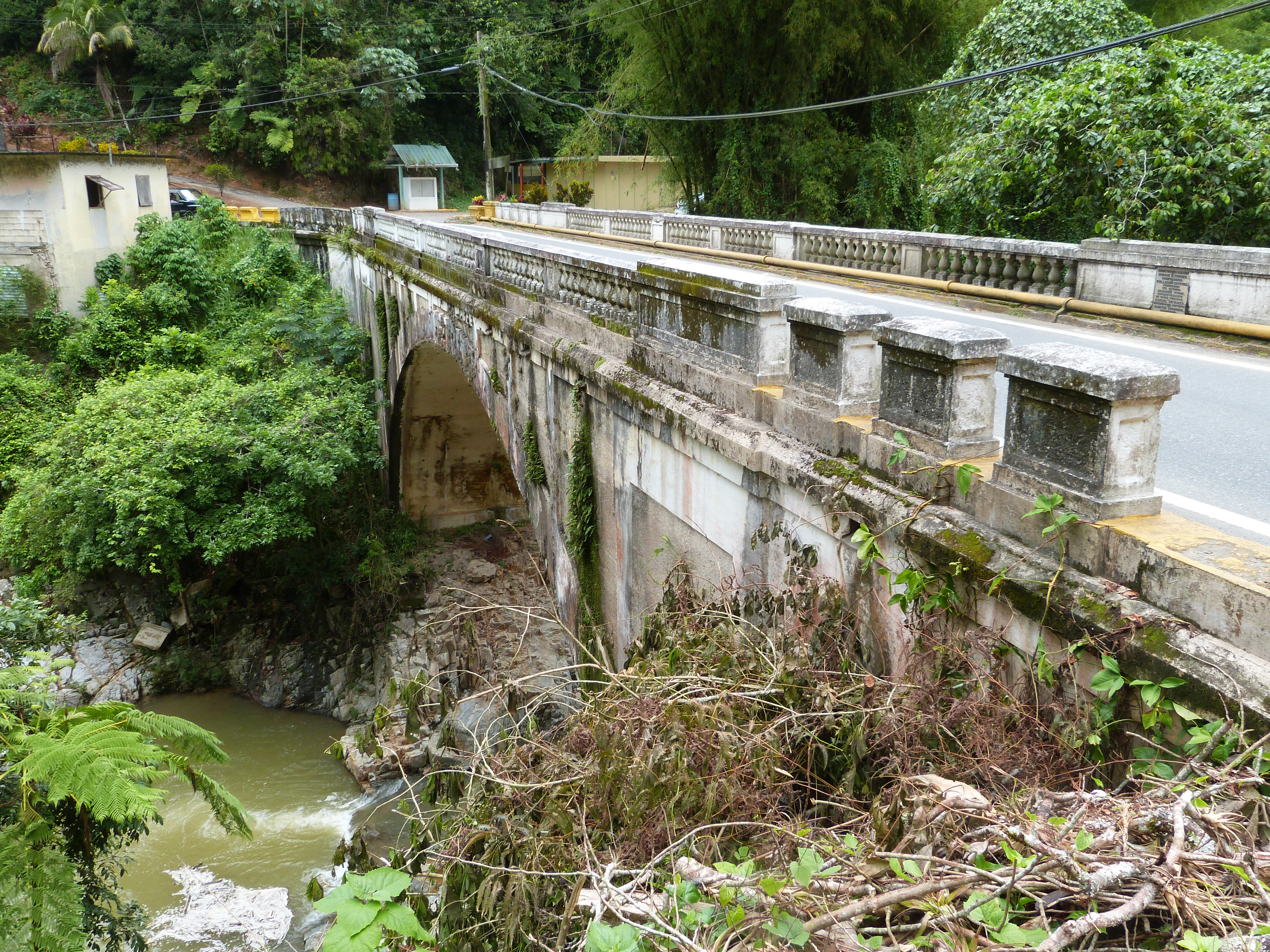

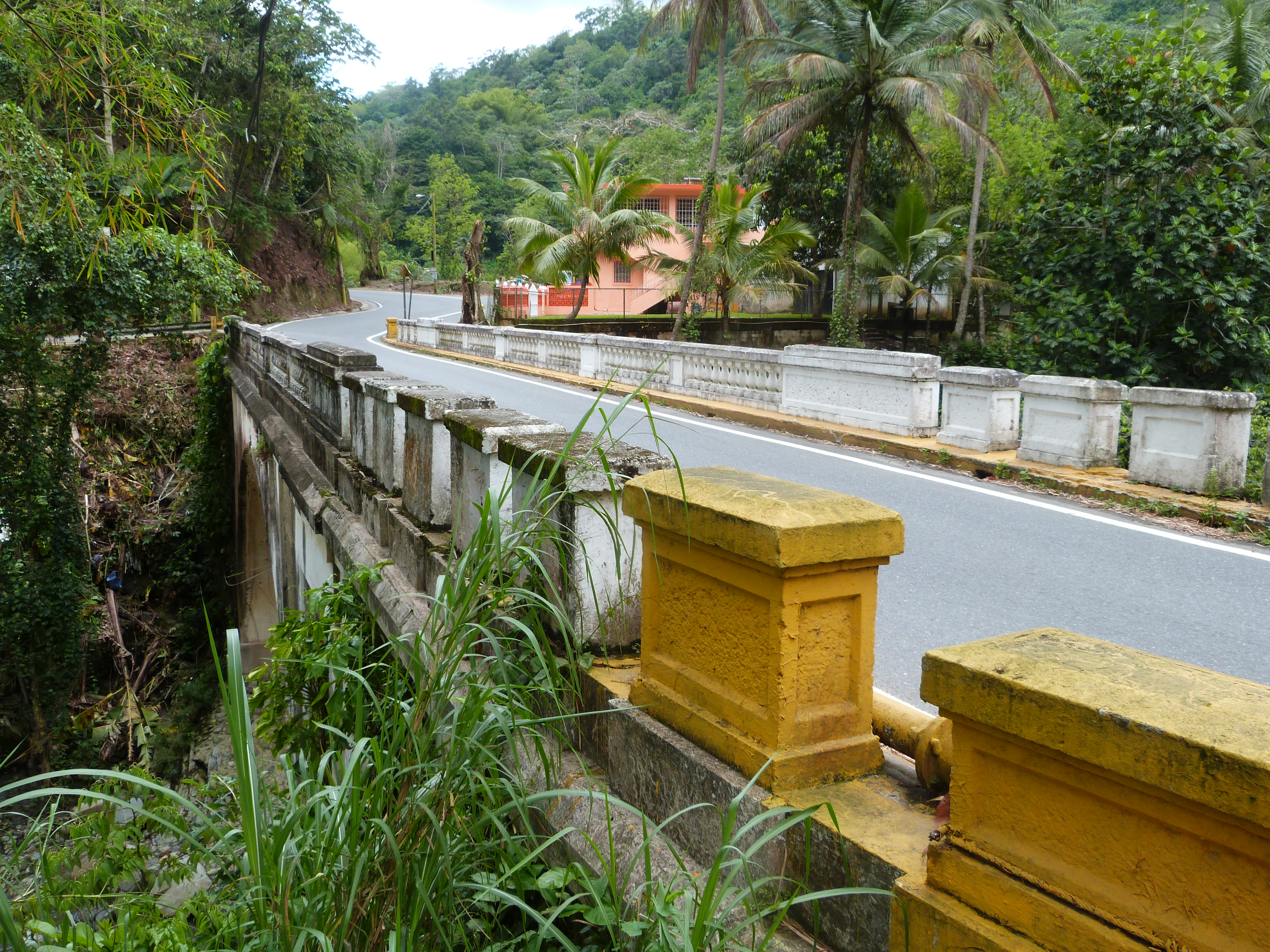
