= Pellejas River =

River of Puerto Rico

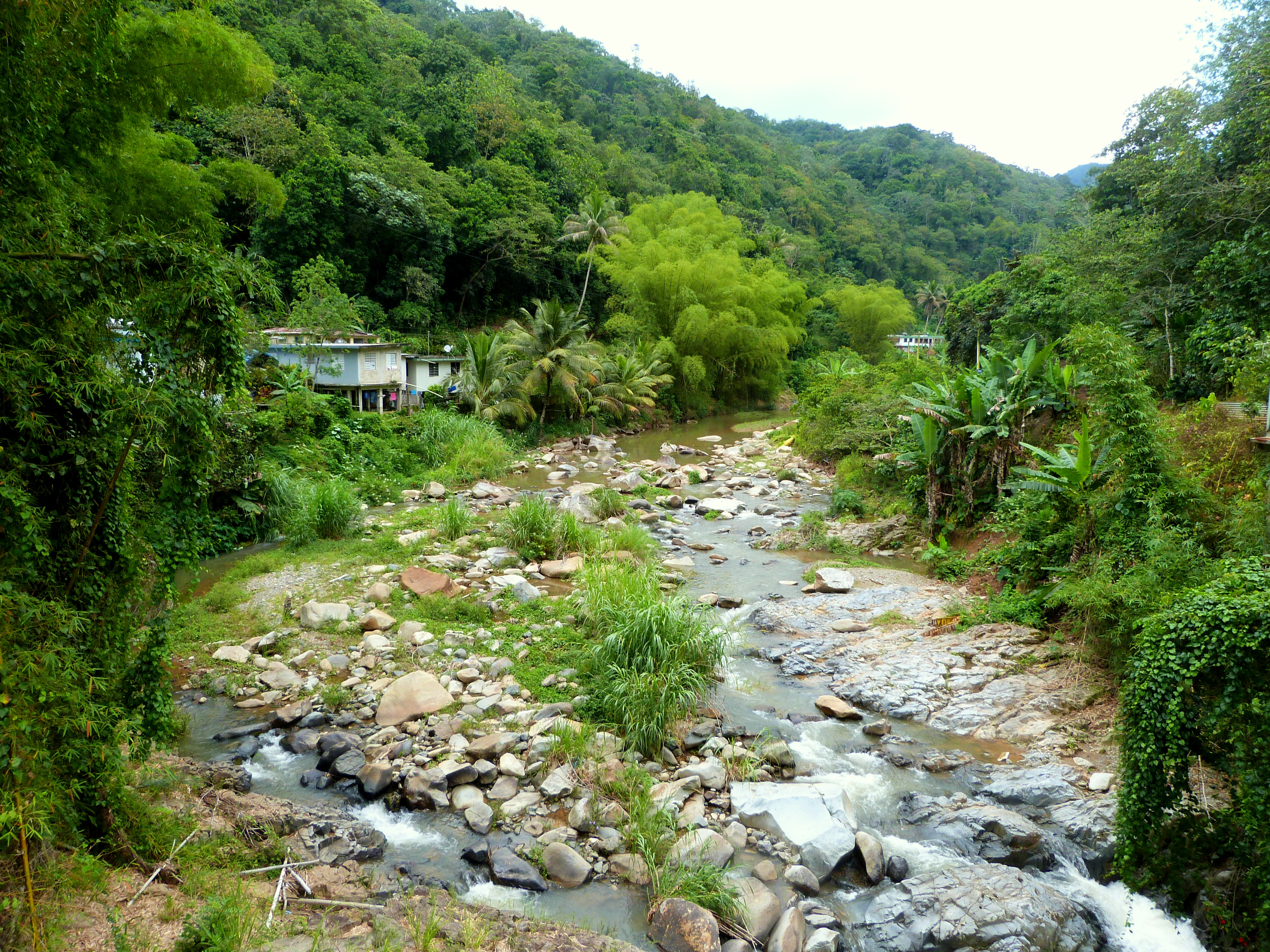
- Native name: Río Pellejas (Spanish)

Location
- Commonwealth: Puerto Rico
- Municipality: Utuado

Physical characteristics
- Source
  - coordinates: 18.2302333°N 66.7176743°W

The Pellejas River (Spanish: Río Pellejas) is a river of Utuado, Puerto Rico. Pellejas is a tributary to the Río Grande de Arecibo river.

== See also ==
- Blanco Bridge: NRHP listing in Utuado, Puerto Rico
- List of rivers of Puerto Rico
