= Cueva La Mora =

Archaeological site in Puerto Rico, US

- U.S. National Register of Historic Places
- Puerto Rico Historic Sites and Zones
- Location: Address restricted
- MPS: Prehistoric Rock Art of Puerto Rico
- NRHP reference No.: 83002292
- RNSZH No.: 2000-(RC)-22-JP-SH

Significant dates
- Added to NRHP: March 10, 1983
- Designated RNSZH: March 15, 2001

Cueva La Mora (Spanish for 'blackberry cave') is the name of a cave and archaeological site located in or near Comerío, Puerto Rico. The cave was added to the United States National Register of Historic Places on March 10, 1983, and to the Puerto Rico Register of Historic Sites and Zones in 2000 due to its importance in yielding information about the Pre-Columbian history of Puerto Rico and the Caribbean.

== Significance ==
The Cueva La Mora archaeological site represents one of the few examples of Indigenous petroglyphs existing in Puerto Rico. Although the existence of petroglyphs is noted throughout the island by researchers, only a handful of sites exist which also contain pictographs. The durability of petroglyphs over pictographs may account for the scarcity of these types of sites, however, no studies have been done to attempt to demonstrate any association which may have existed between the occurrence of petroglyphs and pictographs. Cueva La Mora may provide the basis for this and other types of research.
