= Nuestra Señora de las Mercedes de San Miguel de Hato Grande =

- Nuestra Senora de las Mercedes de San Miguel de Hato Grande
- U.S. National Register of Historic Places
- Puerto Rico Historic Sites and Zones
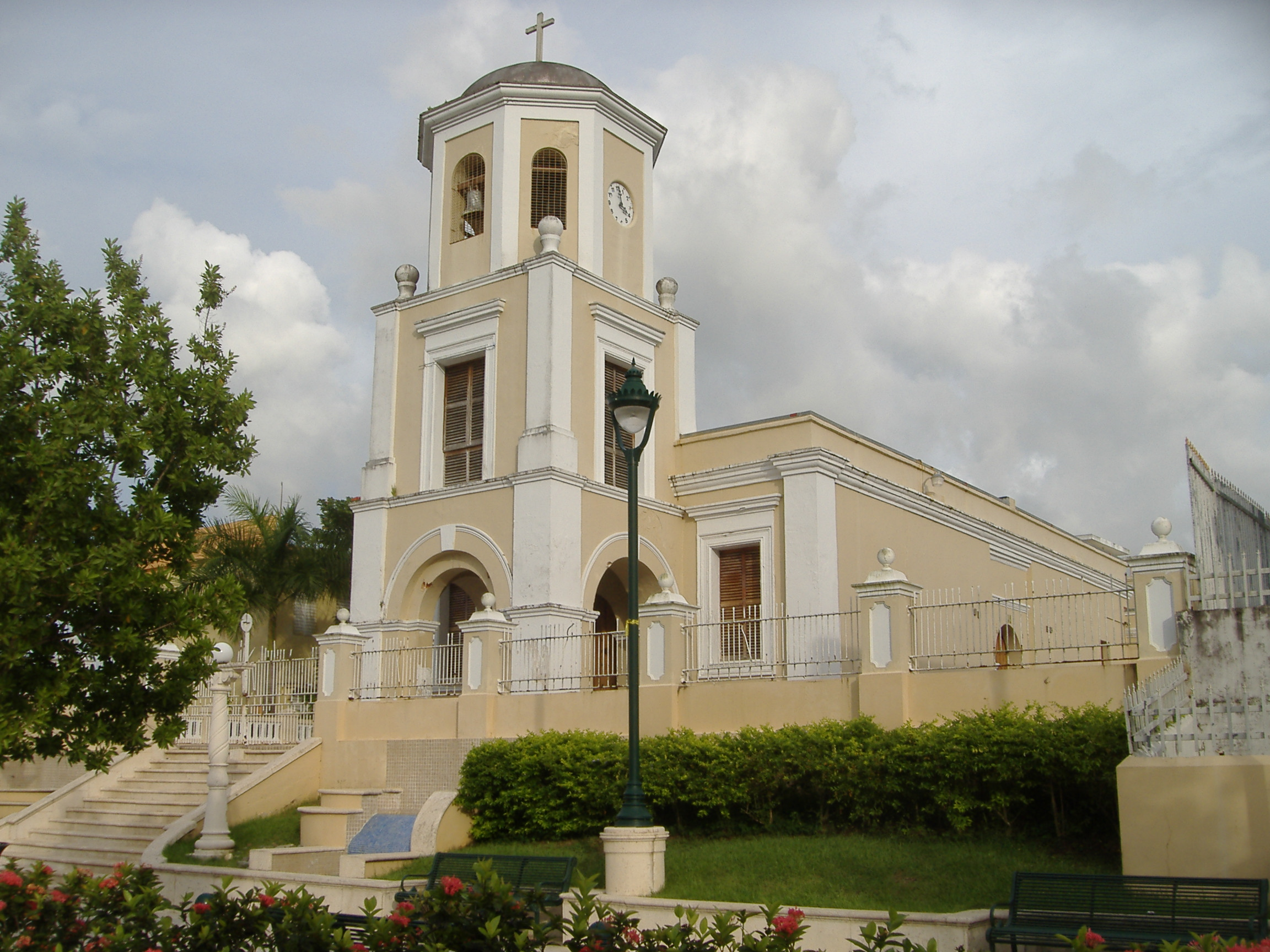
- The church in 2007.

- Location within Puerto Rico
- Location: Colón Street at the plaza of San Lorenzo, Puerto Rico
- Coordinates: 18°11′26″N 65°57′38″W
- Built: 1887
- Architect: Pedro Cobreros
- Architectural style: Classical Revival
- NRHP reference No.: 83004194
- RNSZH No.: 2000-(RCE)-21-JP-SH

Significant dates
- Added to NRHP: December 8, 1983
- Designated RNSZH: December 21, 2000

The Church of Nuestra Señora de las Mercedes de San Miguel de Hato Grande (Spanish: Iglesia Nuestra Señora de las Mercedes de San Miguel de Hato Grande), also known as the Church Las Mercedes of San Lorenzo (Iglesia de las Mercedes de San Lorenzo), is a historic Roman Catholic parish church located in San Lorenzo Pueblo, the administrative and historic center of the municipality of San Lorenzo, Puerto Rico. Las Mercedes was named in honor of both the Virgin Mary and Doña Mercedes Delgado Manso, the wife of the then mayor of San Lorenzo and a descendant of Don Sebastián Delgado Manso, one of the founders of the city of Caguas.

Although the current structure of Las Mercedes officially dates to 1887, it was built at the site of a former chapel originally named Hermitage of Hato Grande (Ermita de Hato Grande, also known then as La Ermita del Hato) that was built in 1737, at a time when San Lorenzo was a newly settled small village. Records from the Caguas City Hall show that the architecture of that hermitage resembled that of Porta Coeli Monastery Church in San Germán. The original structure of the hermitage was preserved as the foundation of the current church, with the current nave and the Neoclassical belltower being added to that original structure in 1814 and in 1876 respectively. The hermitage was upgraded in size with the current walls and façade finally being added in 1887 by state architect Pedro Cobreros. The church is one of the best examples of late 19th century Neoclassical architecture that would set a trend in the religious architecture in the island, and for this reason it was added to the National Register of Historic Places in 1983 and to the Puerto Rico Register of Historic Sites and Zones in 2000.

== Gallery ==
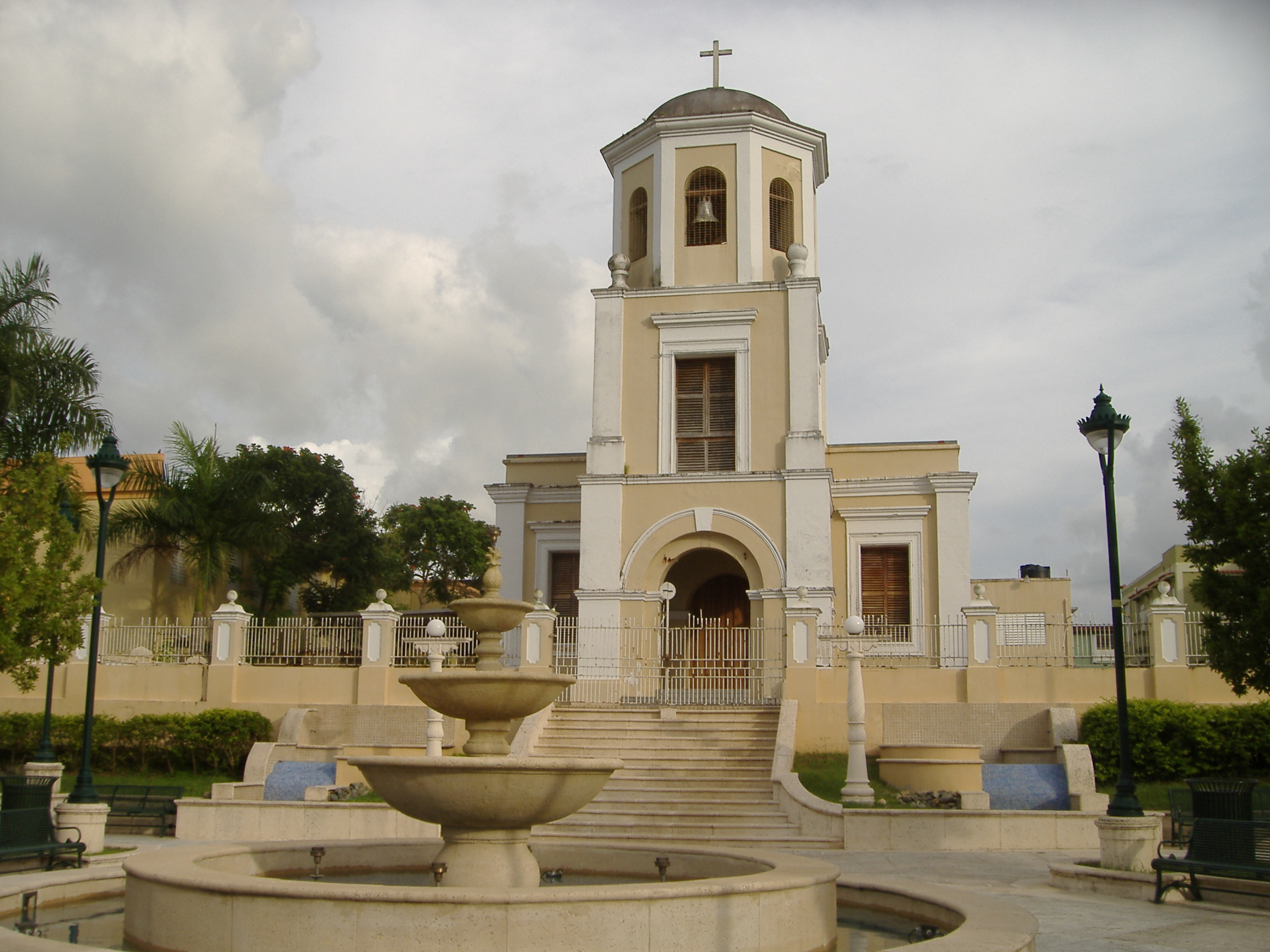
Las Mercedes church from the town square (plaza pública) of San Lorenzo.

== See also ==
- National Register of Historic Places listings in central Puerto Rico
