= Matón River =

River of Puerto Rico

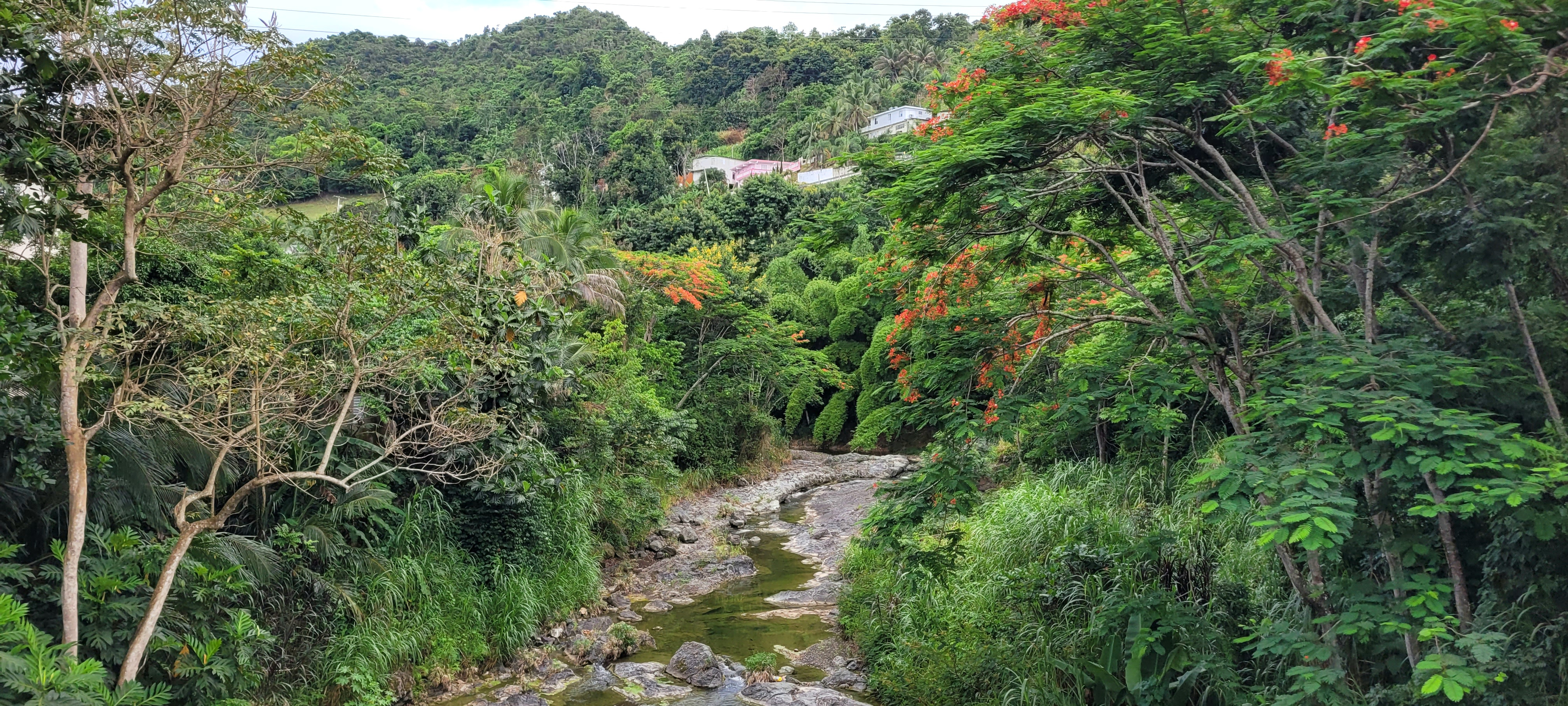
- Matón River from Río Matón Bridge

Location
- Commonwealth: Puerto Rico

Physical characteristics
- Source
  - coordinates: 18.1399594°N 66.2101674°W

The Maton River is a river of Puerto Rico.

It is spanned by the Río Matón Bridge, built in 1886. In 2020, three more bridges were constructed to span the river.

== See also ==
- Río Matón Bridge: NRHP listing in Cayey, Puerto Rico
- List of rivers of Puerto Rico
