= Saliente River =

River of Puerto Rico

Coordinates: 18.2182896°N 66.5901729°W

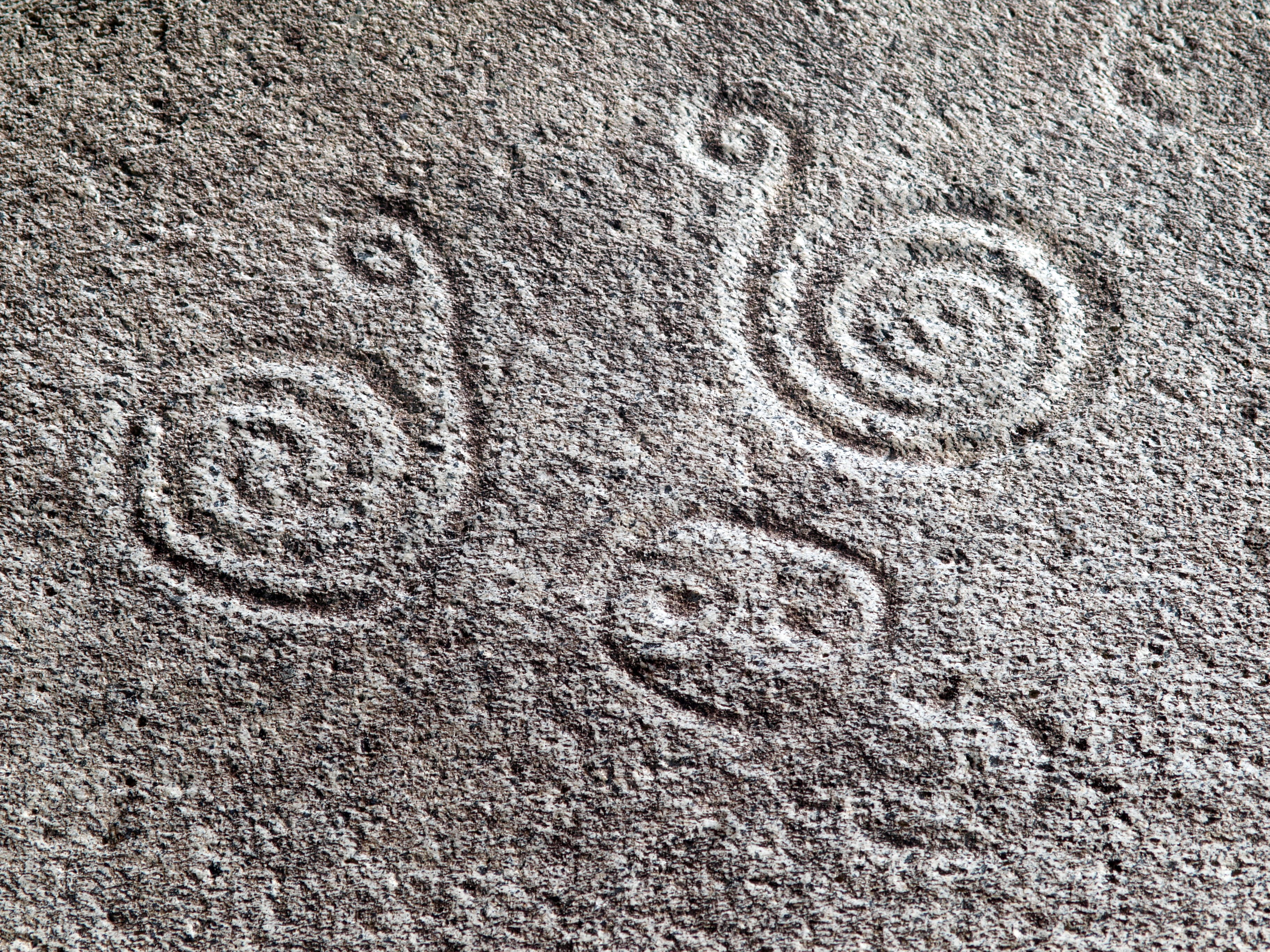
- Piedra Escrita, a boulder in the Saliente River in Jayuya, Puerto Rico

Location
- Commonwealth: Puerto Rico
- Municipality: Jayuya

Physical characteristics
- Source
  - elevation: 1427 ft
- Mouth
  - location: Jayuya, Puerto Rico

The Saliente River is a river in Jayuya, Puerto Rico. Piedra Escrita is a large boulder in the river with petroglyphs from Taino.

== See also ==
- La Piedra Escrita: Rock art site in the river
- List of rivers of Puerto Rico
