= Church Nuestra Señora de la Asunción of Cayey =

Roman Catholic church in Cayey, Puerto Rico

- U.S. National Register of Historic Places
- Puerto Rico Historic Sites and Zones
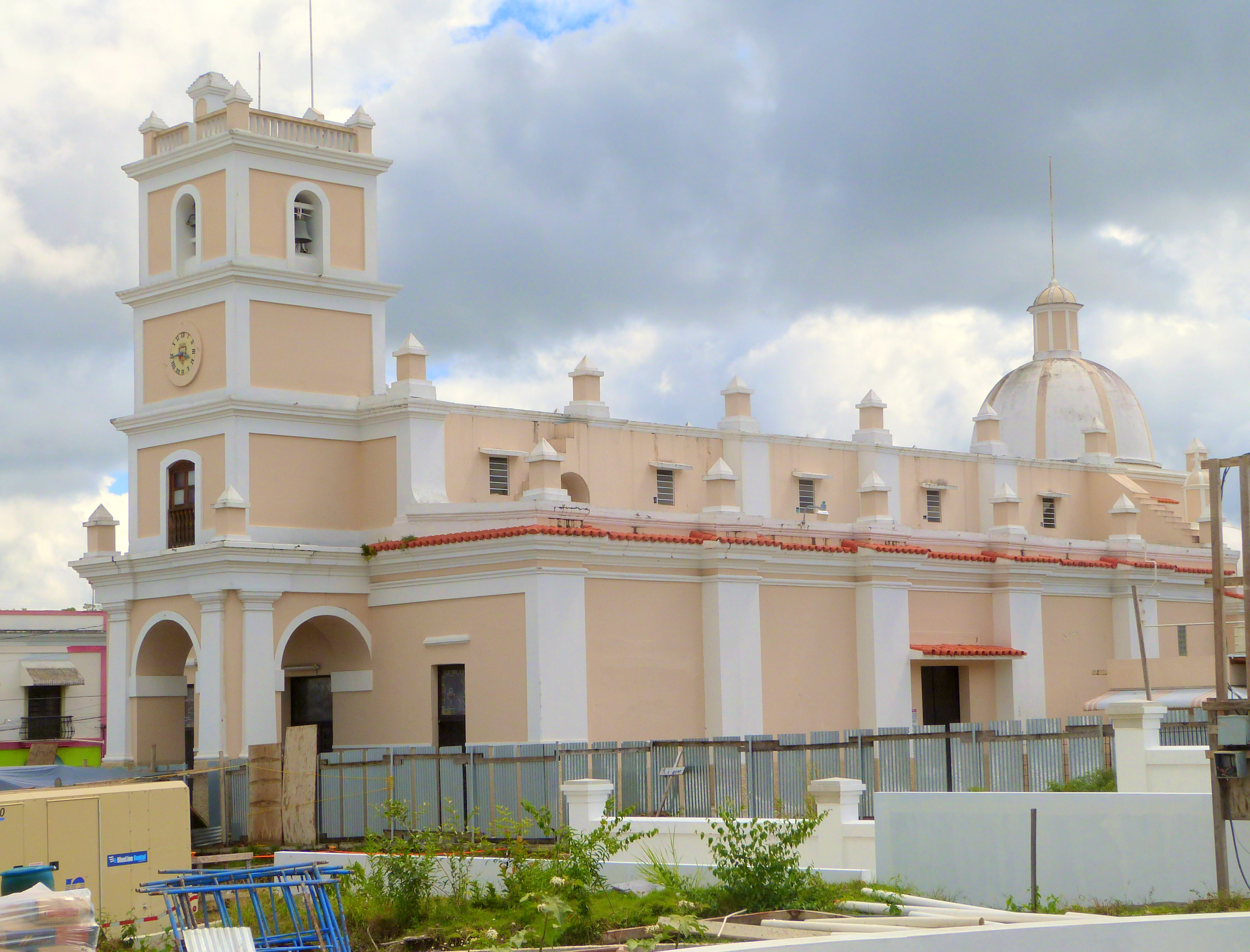
- Church during renovations to the town plaza. 2017

- Location within Puerto Rico
- Location: Muñoz Rivera Street, Town Plaza Pueblo, Cayey, Puerto Rico
- Coordinates: 18°6′46″N 66°9′57″W
- Built: 1815
- Architect: José Canovas
- NRHP reference No.: 84000454
- RNSZH No.: 2000-(RCE)-21-JP-SH

Significant dates
- Added to NRHP: December 10, 1984
- Designated RNSZH: December 21, 2000

The Church Nuestra Señora de la Asunción (Spanish: Iglesia Nuestra Señora de la Asunción de Cayey) is a Roman Catholic parish church located at the Plaza Ramón Frade square (plaza pública) of downtown Cayey in the municipality of Cayey, Puerto Rico. The church was designed by engineer José Canovas and was built in 1815, with modifications being made in 1889. It was added to the United States National Register of Historic Places on December 10, 1984, and on the Puerto Rico Register of Historic Sites and Zones in 2000.

Archaeological findings in 2016 uncovered the original church walls and, in 2019, more than 300 bone remains from the 17th and 19th centuries were found during renovations to the town plaza of Cayey. These are preserved and can be seen at the square in front of the church.

== See also ==
- National Register of Historic Places listings in central Puerto Rico
