= Eugenio María de Hostos School =

Historic building in Las Marías, Puerto Rico

- U.S. National Register of Historic Places
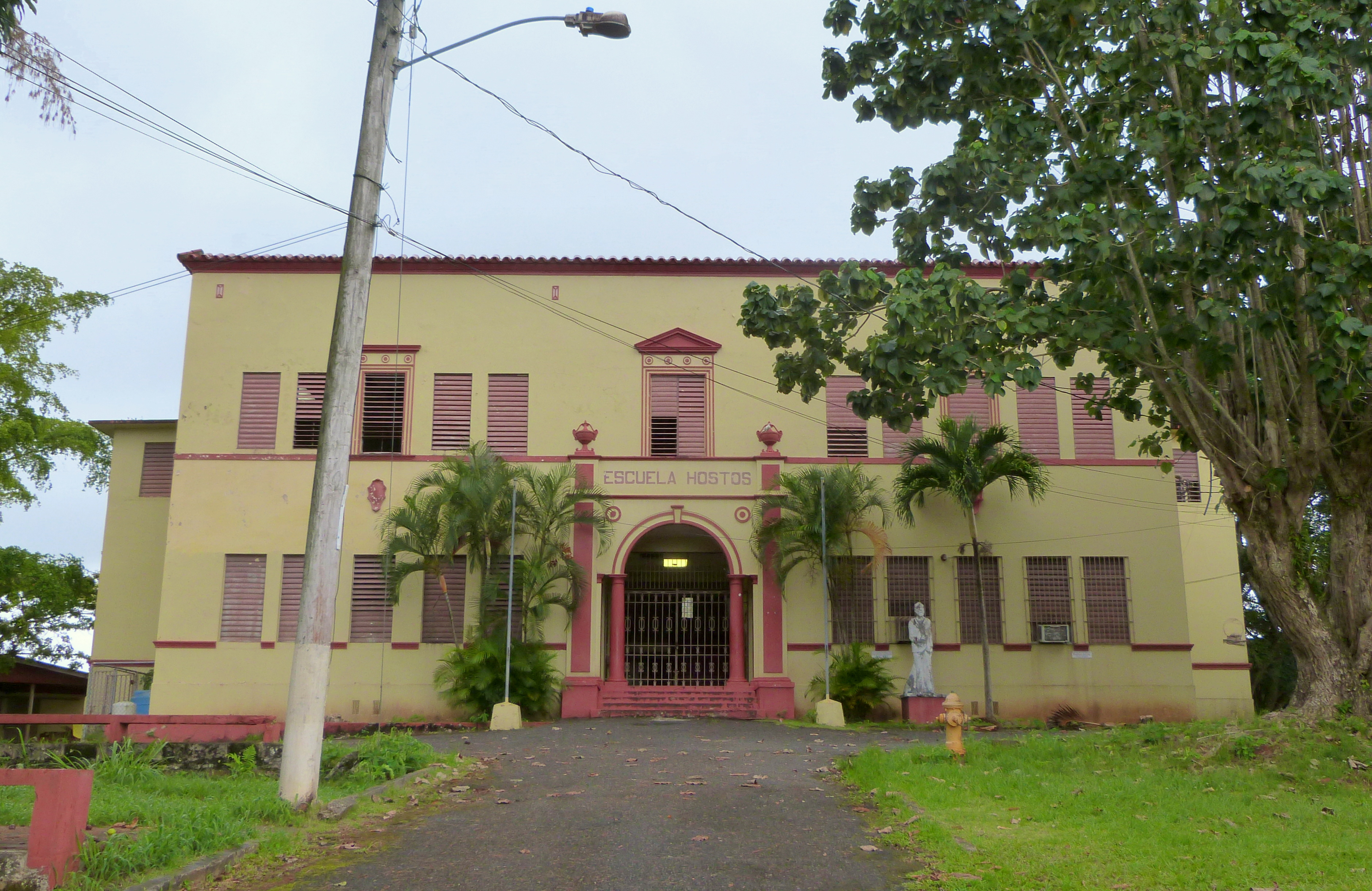
- The school in 2017.

- Location within Puerto Rico
- Location: Matías Brugman Avenue in Las Marías, Puerto Rico
- Coordinates: 18.24997°N 66.98982°W
- Built: 1938
- Architect: Rafael Carmoega, Francisco Gardon Vega
- Architectural style: Mission/Spanish Revival
- NRHP reference No.: 12001077
- Added to NRHP: December 19, 2012

Eugenio María de Hostos School (Spanish: Escuela Eugenio María de Hostos) is a historic early 20th century school located in Las Marías, Puerto Rico.

== History ==
The school building was designed in the Mission Spanish Revival style and built in 1938. Funding for the construction came from the Puerto Rico Reconstruction Administration, a New Deal agency. The school was designed by Puerto Rican State Architect Rafael Carmoega.

It was added to the United States National Register of Historic Places on December 19, 2012.
