= Río de la Mina (Coamo, Puerto Rico) =

River of Puerto Rico

Coordinates: 18.0610736°N 66.3729475°W

Location
- Commonwealth: Puerto Rico
- Municipality: Coamo

The Río de la Mina (Coamo, Puerto Rico) is a river of Puerto Rico.

It is also known as Las Minas River.

It is spanned in Coamo, Puerto Rico by the 1862-built General Méndez Vigo Bridge, which brings what is now Puerto Rico Highway 14 across the river.

== See also ==
- List of rivers of Puerto Rico
