= Ball court/plaza sites of Puerto Rico and the U.S. Virgin Islands =

- U.S. National Register of Historic Places
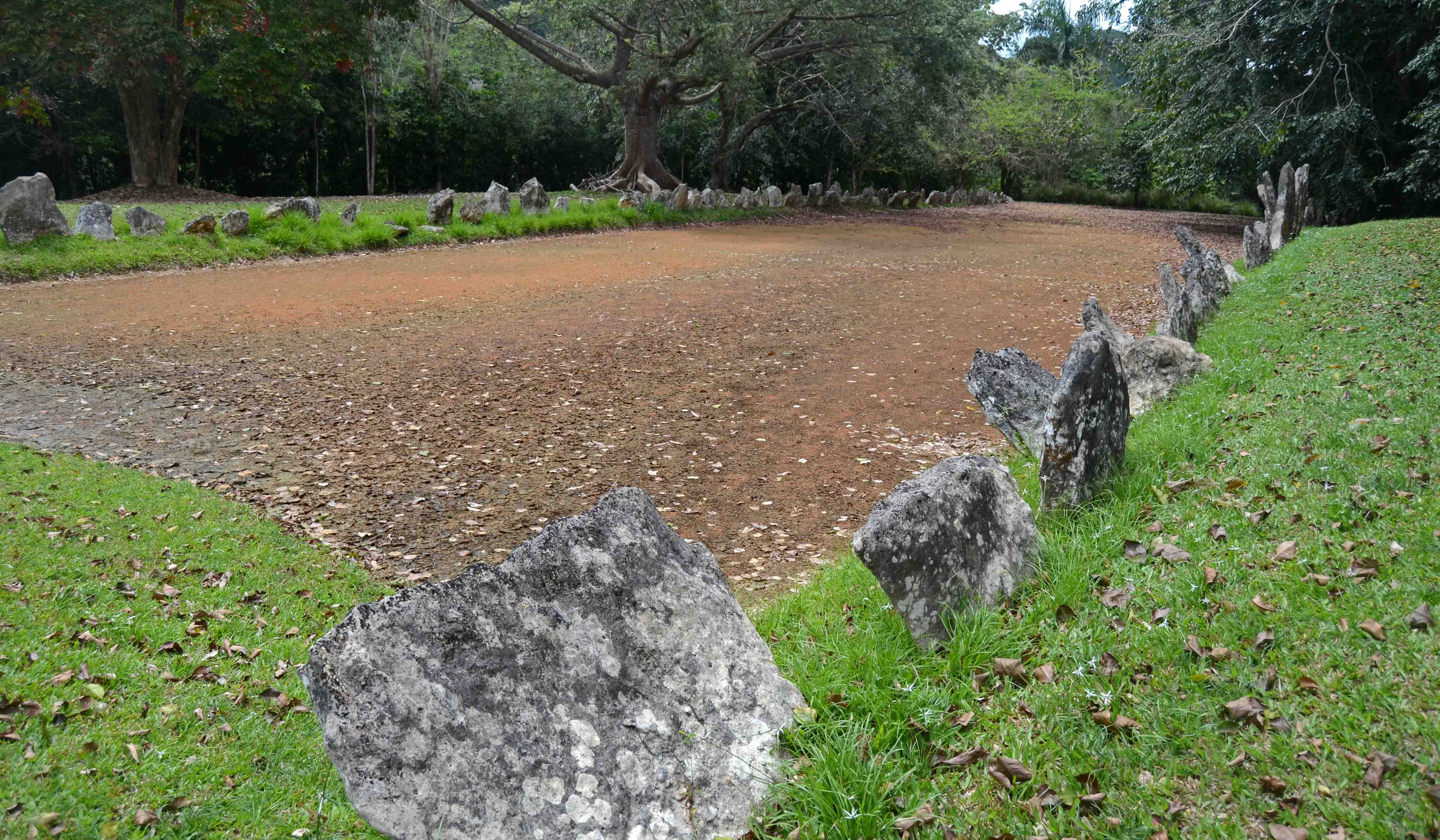
- Caguana Ceremonial Ball Courts Site
- Location: Various in Puerto Rico and the U.S. Virgin Islands
- MPS: Ball Court/Plaza Sites of Puerto Rico and the U.S. Virgin Islands
- NRHP reference No.: 64500749

Ball court/plaza sites of Puerto Rico and the U.S. Virgin Islands are the subject of a multiple property submission to the National Register of Historic Places (NRHP) in the U.S. territories of Puerto Rico and the Virgin Islands. The submission consists of 56 archaeological sites containing bateyes (53 sites in Puerto Rico and 3 sites on the island of St. Croix), out of which five have been inscribed in the NRHP.

== List of ball court/plaza sites ==
The following list includes all known ball court sites in the United States territories in the Caribbean as identified by the State Historic Preservation Offices of the commonwealth of Puerto Rico and the territory of the U.S. Virgin Islands, documented and surveyed by the National Register Programs Division with the Southeast Regional Office of the National Park Service.

Site name	Image	Location	Notes
Caguana (U-10)		Utuado, Puerto Rico	NRHP-listed in 1992, designated a National Historic Landmark in 1993, and recognized by the UNESCO Astronomy and World Heritage Initiative.
Angeles		Utuado, Puerto Rico	Research required.
Los Pastales I		Utuado, Puerto Rico	Probably destroyed.
Los Pastales II		Utuado, Puerto Rico	Research required.
Santa Isabel		Utuado, Puerto Rico	Research required.
El Cordón		Utuado, Puerto Rico	Research required.
Salto Arriba		Utuado, Puerto Rico	Probably destroyed.
Gerena		Utuado, Puerto Rico	Research required.
Muñiz		Utuado, Puerto Rico	Research required.
Arce		Utuado, Puerto Rico	Research required.
Sumidero		Utuado, Puerto Rico	Research required.
Arocho		Utuado, Puerto Rico	Probably destroyed.
Godoy		Utuado, Puerto Rico	Research required.
Torres Cortés		Utuado, Puerto Rico	Research required.
Cuevas I		Utuado, Puerto Rico	Probably destroyed.
Cuevas II		Utuado, Puerto Rico	Probably destroyed.
Cayuco		Utuado, Puerto Rico	Research required.
Cortés-Cayuco		Utuado, Puerto Rico	Research required.
Casa Vieja		Utuado, Puerto Rico	Research required.
Bermúdez		Utuado, Puerto Rico	Research required.
Ferino		Utuado, Puerto Rico	Research required.
Consejo		Utuado, Puerto Rico	Research required.
Callejones (LR-2)		Lares, Puerto Rico	Listed in the NRHP in 1999.
Barrio La Vega		Orocovis, Puerto Rico	Research required.
Sabana I-Ildefonso		Orocovis, Puerto Rico	Research required.
Sabana II		Orocovis, Puerto Rico	Research required, probably eligible.
Pellejas		Utuado, Puerto Rico	Research required, probably eligible.
Saltos		Orocovis, Puerto Rico	Research required.
Vegas Arriba		Adjuntas, Puerto Rico	Research required.
Pellajas I		Adjuntas, Puerto Rico	Research required.
Palo Hincado (BA-1)		Barranquitas, Puerto Rico	Listed in the NRHP in 1999.
La Toje (BA-2)		Barranquitas, Puerto Rico	Research required, probably eligible.
Quebrada Grande (BA-3)		Barranquitas, Puerto Rico	Research required, probably eligible.
La Zama		Jayuya, Puerto Rico	Research required, probably eligible.
Veguitas		Jayuya, Puerto Rico	Research required.
Jauca		Jayuya, Puerto Rico	Research required.
Villón (CO-2)		Coamo, Puerto Rico	Research required, probably eligible.
Coamo Arriba		Coamo, Puerto Rico	Research required.
Las Flores		Coamo, Puerto Rico	Research required.
Toita		Cidra, Puerto Rico	Research required, probably eligible.
Diego Hernández		Yauco, Puerto Rico	Research required.
Mattei		Yauco, Puerto Rico	Research required.
Esperanza		Salinas, Puerto Rico	Research required, probably eligible.
Minas		Juana Díaz, Puerto Rico	Research required.
Tibes (PO-1)		Ponce, Puerto Rico	Listed in the NRHP in 1978.
Llanos Tuna (CR-12)		Cabo Rojo, Puerto Rico	Research required, probably eligible.
Delfín del Yagüez		Mayagüez, Puerto Rico	Eligible, not yet NRHP-listed.
Cotuí		San Germán, Puerto Rico	Research required.
Bayaney		Hatillo, Puerto Rico	Research required.
Tierras Nuevas		Manatí, Puerto Rico	Research required.
El Destino		Vieques, Puerto Rico	May be destroyed.
Corral de los Indios		Mayagüez, Puerto Rico	Located in Isla de Mona. Listed in the NRHP in 1993, part of the Isla de Mona Historic District.
Bajura de los Cerezos		Mayagüez, Puerto Rico	Located in Isla de Mona. Listed in the NRHP in 1993, part of the Isla de Mona Historic District.
Salt River (12VAml-6)		St. Croix, Virgin Islands	NHL and NRHP-listed Ceremonial plaza site part of the Salt River Bay National Historical Park and Ecological Preserve.
Longford		St. Croix, Virgin Islands	Research required.
Robins Bay (12VAml-27)		St. Croix, Virgin Islands	Research required.

== See also ==
- Bateyes de Viví
- Taino archaeology
