= Bateyes de Viví =

- U.S. National Register of Historic Places
- Location: Address restricted
- Nearest city: Utuado, Puerto Rico
- MPS: Ball Court/Plaza Sites of Puerto Rico and the U.S. Virgin Islands
- NRHP reference No.: 07000584
- Added to NRHP: June 21, 2007

Bateyes de Viví (U-1) is a pre-Hispanic archaeological site located in the Viví Arriba barrio of the municipality of Utuado, Puerto Rico. The archaeological site consists of seven uncovered ball court and plaza sites or bateyes. The site, also known by the names of Dance Grounds Butterbaughs Estate or Vega del Hoyo Site, was added to the National Register of Historic Places in 2007 as part of the Ball court/plaza sites of Puerto Rico and the U.S. Virgin Islands multiple property submission which includes 53 other sites in Puerto Rico and 3 sites on the island of St. Croix in the U.S. Virgin Islands.

== See also ==
- Taino archaeology
