= Pomier Caves =

Series of caves in Dominican Republic

- Pictographs in 'Cueva Numero Uno'

- location in the Dominican Republic
- 18°28′03.61″N 70°08′05.86″W
- Periods: from 2,000 years ago
- Associated with: Taino, Carib, Igneri
- Location: north of San Cristobal
- Region: southern Dominican Republic

The Pomier Caves are a series of 55 caves located north of San Cristobal in the south of the Dominican Republic. They contain the largest collection of rock art in the Caribbean created since 2,000 years ago primarily by the Taíno people but also the Kalinago people and the Igneri, the pre-Columbian Indigenous inhabitants of the Bahamas, Greater Antilles, and some of the Lesser Antilles. These caves have been damaged by the uncontrolled mining of limestone nearby.

== Importance ==
Archaeologists have described the importance of preserving these caves which were first discovered in 1851. The caves contain approximately 6,000 drawings, carvings and pictographs of birds, fish, reptiles, and human figures. The paintings were drawn with charcoal mixed with animal fat. Archaeologists say that the paintings have been protected by the natural humidity provided by the depth of the caves.

== Protection ==
In 1996, the Anthropological Reserve of Cuevas de Borbón in San Cristóbal was enlarged to protect the El Pomier caves from limestone quarrying. This raised their protection category, and included them in the National System of Protected Areas, through the General Law on Environmental and Natural Resources, Law 64-00, which also gave instructions to the Secretariat de Estate supervising its application.

Given the international importance of these caves for the study of Amerindian groups that inhabited the Caribbean Islands for nearly 8,000 years prior to the arrival of western culture, the caves are being considered for the unique category of Capital Prehistoric De Las Antillas (Prehistoric Capital of the Antilles) and the rehabilitation of one of its caves and its surrounding area to match this new category.

== See also ==
- Carib
- Igneri
- Taíno
