= White Marl =

Archaeological site

The White Marl site is a Taíno archaeological site between Kingston and Spanish town of Jamaica. Several archaeological studies in Jamaica have contributed to public knowledge regarding Amerindians. Across the entire island, the Archaeological Society of Jamaica has conducted excavations and surveys of Indigenous sites since 1965. This archaeological settlement is composed of 18th and 19th-century British sugar estates and plantations. Several descriptions of the settlement have been accounted for by several archaeologists over time. Some of these studies include an archaeological study conducted by Robert Randolph Howard, Charles Cotter, and Richard Hill. Richard Hill made the first description of the White Marl site detailing pottery, human remains, and large amounts of animal life including marine mollusks and duties. These indigenous sites have been found to be composed of three main features: petroglyphs, caves, and midden deposits. There is also often an absence of ceremonial structures, ball courts, and large plazas. The caves explored have been compiled of Indigenous remains suggesting the use of caves as burial sites by the Taíno communities. Through studying these burial sites significant evidence has been found to establish that during the early colonial occupation of Jamaica adventure the White Marl was still inhabited during the Spanish's time with the island. There has been a considerate discovery regarding Jamaican pottery. Influences of Haitian and Cuban pottery have been identified in the recovered Jamaican pottery artifacts.

== History ==
Despite frequent interactions between Taíno society and Spanish settlers, there is little existence and recollection of these occurrences in the narratives written by various settlers. The White Marl settlement was an essential resource for early Taíno communities. The village of Maima is positioned on top of a hillside above the coastal plain. Research from 2014 and 2015 introduces that through leveled platforms and artificial terraces for house construction, the Taíno people were able to achieve this settlement. The government of Jamaica purchased the 300 acre plantation in 1971 in order to preserve, examine and protect the valuable information attainable through the exploration of one of the earliest dated heritage parks in the country.

The White Marl Site was located amongst the Fresh River and Rio Cobre and was one the larger villages in the densely populated area. This highlights the importance of the site as a sociocultural hotspot for the social networks of precolonial Jamaica.

An avid archaeologist in the 1940s, Charles Cotter also documented several groups of indigenous people scattered across the region. Spain offered and provided archaeological expertise and funding in order to conduct research on the first Spanish colony and these test excavations expanded to the White Marl site in 1982.

== Architectural remains ==
Prior to excavations conducted in 2014, there was little to no existence of architectural features in Jamaican Archaeology, thus fostering excitement beyond engineering ability as newfound terraces and platforms were discovered In Maima. The excavations from these homes provided a diverse range of cultural materials with varying usages. Found amongst these cultural materials were net weights, handstones and manos, flaked stone expedient tools, branch coral sprigs, and petaloid adzes. Several vessel like artifacts were located during these excavations of a variety of shapes and sizes including boat shaped vessels

The institute of Jamaica( IOJ) created a laboratory, museum and residence to aid in the area preserving the White Marl site and recognize Howard's archaeological research. The Taíno museum built along the edge of the White Marl site was closed in 2007.

== Human remains ==
The findings of human remains on the White Marl have also granted crucial information regarding the precolonial life practices and death practices. Through various excavations in caves on the White Marl site there were sections of human remains found amongst the pottery and shell technology. These remains were discovered in a variety of different orientations and positions with goods and other materials scattered in the area and on top of the remains. Often these human remains were discovered amongst dog remains throughout the Caribbean despite this practice's scarcity elsewhere around the world. Consistently throughout these house excavations archaeologist were able to decipher a post-Columbus end date for their occupations through Spanish-derived artifacts.

Despite findings of a house structure near the burial site in St.Clair, there is very little to no evidence depicting a relationship between houses and burial sites in the White Marl Site.

== Radiocarbon dating and isotope analysis ==
From a sample of three human burial sites, Beta Analysis, collected both bone and tooth samples were taken to be submitted for carbon & nitrogen isotopic analysis and radiocarbon dating. In order to gain a realistic date the study also corrected the previously determined Radiocarbon dates by including the estimated marine protein contribution to their diet. Due to the poor preservation techniques age estimation wasn't possible through auricular surface morphology, pubic symphysis, and sternal rib end changes, however was accomplished through studying different dental patterns. Subadult age was determined by the closure of epiphyseal sutures and dental eruption, whilst adult age was determined through dental attrition patterns.

== Material culture ==
Within Jamaica, there have been various discoveries of shells, stone, ceramic, and wood technology across several archaeological sites. Often these stone discoveries end up in British museums and sold as collector items. An abundance of hammer stones and pounders were recovered with side scrappers and Flint ends, Some of these recovered materials built through shell material were identified as spatulas, scrappers, and awls. George Lechler, the past president of the Archaeological Society of Jamaica discovered a shell horn at Chancey Hall. Despite their extensive woodworking skills due to wood's perishable quality limited discovery has been made of the materials created by the Arawaks. The exception were wooden artifacts recovered from desiccated-dry environments or were in a carbonized or waterlogged state such as the wooden Arawak bird located in the White Marl Museum. There are several underfunded Amerindian excavation sites despite the copious amounts of funding and media attention Spanishtown, Port Royal and Seville receive.
