= Tibes Indigenous Ceremonial Center =

Archeology museum in Ponce, Puerto Rico

- Centro Ceremonial Indígena
- U.S. National Register of Historic Places
- Puerto Rico Historic Sites and Zones
- Location within Puerto Rico
- Coordinates: 18°2′32.05″N 66°37′18.41″W
- Area: 40 acres (16 ha)
- Built: 25 AD
- MPS: Ball court/plaza sites of Puerto Rico and the U.S. Virgin Islands
- NRHP reference No.: 78003381
- Added to NRHP: 14 April 1978

Centro Ceremonial Indígena de Tibes
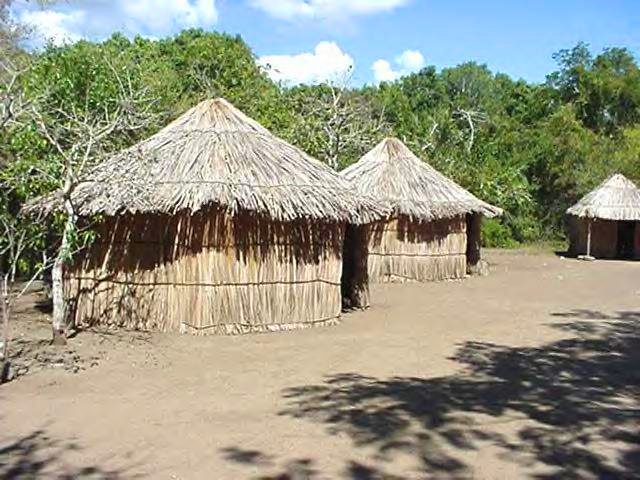
- Taíno village at Tibes
- Established: 30 April 1982
- Location: Road PR-503; Sector La Vega de Taní; Barrio Tibes; Ponce, Puerto Rico
- Type: Archeology museum
- Visitors: 60,000–80,000 per year
- Director: José Reyes Feliciano (default Director)
- Owner: Autonomous Municipality of Ponce
- Website: visitponce.com/projects/parque-indigena-tibes

The Tibes Indigenous Ceremonial Center (Spanish: Centro Ceremonial Indígena de Tibes) in Sector La Vega de Taní, Barrio Tibes, Ponce, Puerto Rico, houses one of the most important archaeological discoveries made in the Antilles. The discovery provides an insight as to how the Indigenous tribes of the Igneri and Taínos lived and played during and before the arrival of Christopher Columbus to the New World. Tibes is the oldest Antillean Indian ceremonial and sports complex yet uncovered in Puerto Rico.

According to archeologists, the ball parks and ceremonial centers were built by the Igneri culture, a Pre-Taíno tribe which inhabited the island. Modern technology tells us that the area was populated in 25 AD and that the Igneri abandoned the area in 600 AD for some unknown reason or reasons. The Taínos, then, populated the same area in 1000 AD. Over 186 human remains were found within the boundaries of the ceremonial center, in what is considered to be the largest Indigenous cemetery in the region. Most of the remains were from the Igneri culture.

Within its boundaries is also the largest Indigenous cemetery discovered to date – consisting of 186 human skeletons, most from the Igneri and the rest from the pre-Taíno cultures. Based on the orientation of the ceremonial plazas, this is also believed to be the oldest astronomical observatory in the Antilles. The museum was established in 1982 and restored in 1991.

== Significance ==
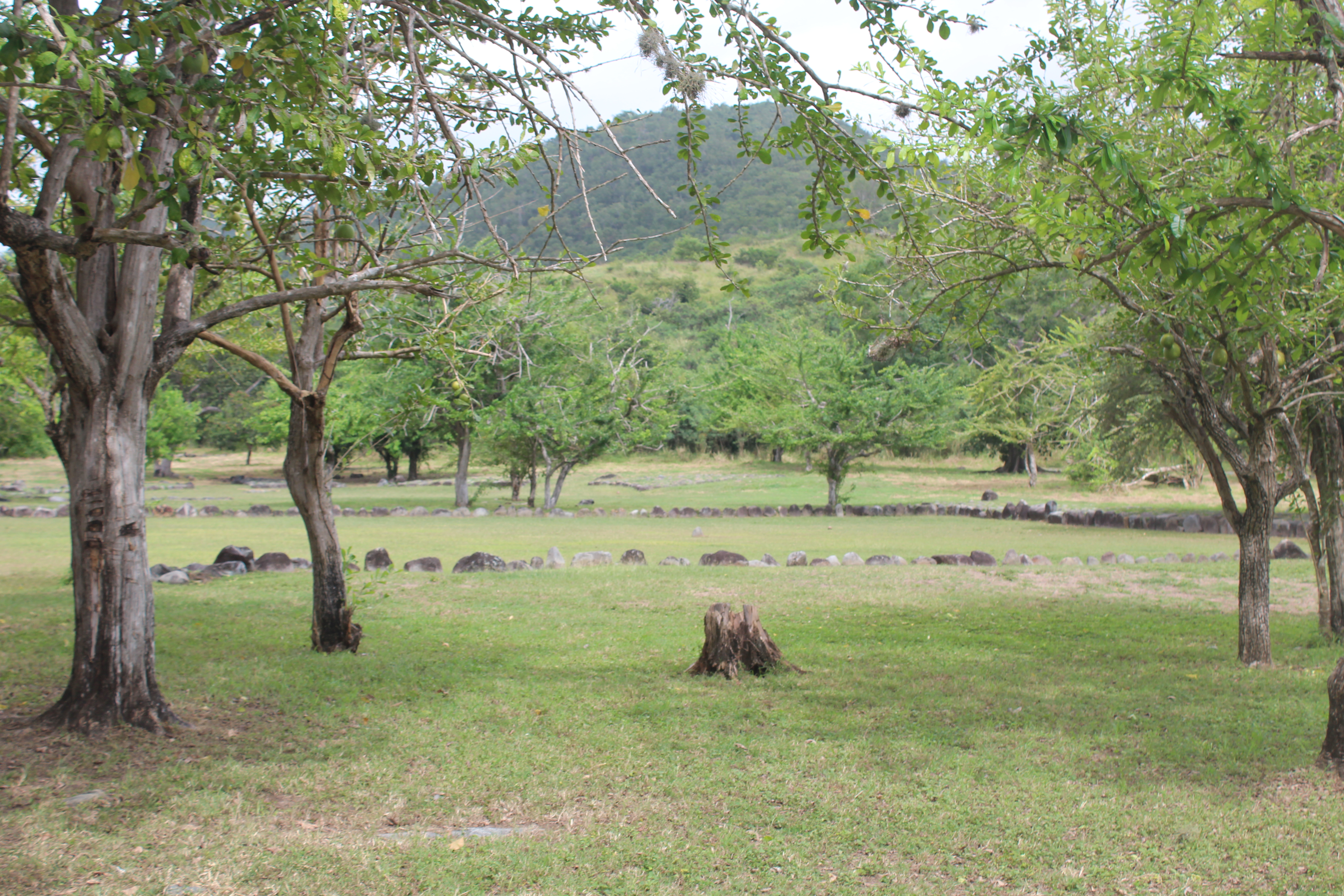
Bateyes at the site

The Tibes Indigenous Ceremonial Center is one of the largest and most significant Indigenous sites in the Caribbean islands, and is the largest ceremonial site in Puerto Rico.

The continuous occupation from Igneri to Taíno times, the presence of the large stone constructions, the presence of shell middens and stratified deposits, all afford an opportunity to investigate some of the major substantive and theoretical problems in Caribbean archeology. Besides lending itself to the traditional problems of culture, history and chronology, the site provides the ideal setting for the study of the cultural processes responsible for the transition from Igneri to Taíno cultural manifestation. There has been some controversy in the literature as to whether there was a direct unilinear, in situ, transition from one to the other or whether the two manifestations actually represent two different groups. The data at this site can contribute significantly to the resolution of this research problem, as well as to other basic questions pertaining to the changes in sociopolitical organization which may have gone along with the changes evidenced in the material culture.

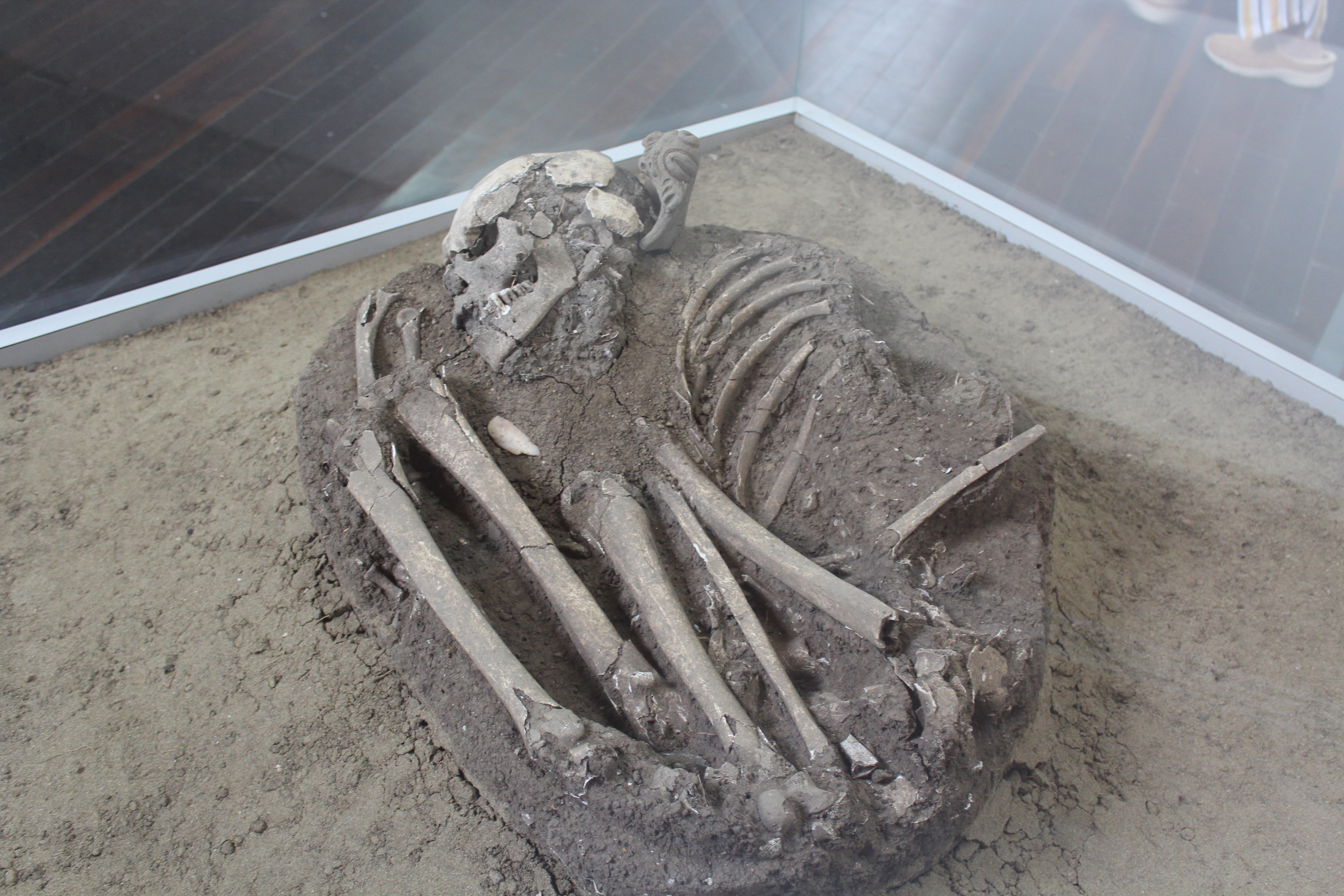
Effigy reproduction of one of the site remains

The site also lends itself to the study of problems relating to extra-Antillean influences on the Caribbean. The evidence from the site indicates that possible influences from Mesoamerica, e.g. the ball game, are in evidence in Puerto Rico as early as 700 A.D. The presence of shell middens and refuse heaps at the site will afford an opportunity to study subsistence patterns as well as possibly some information on the paleo-environment. The burials and associated grave goods will provide an insight into social, religious, ceremonial/symbolic systems of these occupants, as well as provide information on prehistoric demographic patterns, nutrition, disease and other prehistoric population characteristics.

Over 186 human remains were found within the boundaries of the ceremonial center, in what is considered to be the largest Indigenous cemetery in the region. Most of the remains were from the Igneri Culture and DNA samples have been taken from the remains for further studies. Information such as the ceremonies, eating habits, ceramic styles and much more has been provided from these remains and from the excavations.

The site is now a tourist attraction which was opened to the public on 30 April 1982. Artifacts found on the site are on display and can be seen in a museum on the site and at the Ponce Museum of Art.

It was listed in the National Register of Historic Places on 14 April 1978 and on the Puerto Rico Register of Historic Sites and Zones on May 16, 2001. It is known as the Centro Ceremonial Indígena de Tibes.

== Physical appearance ==
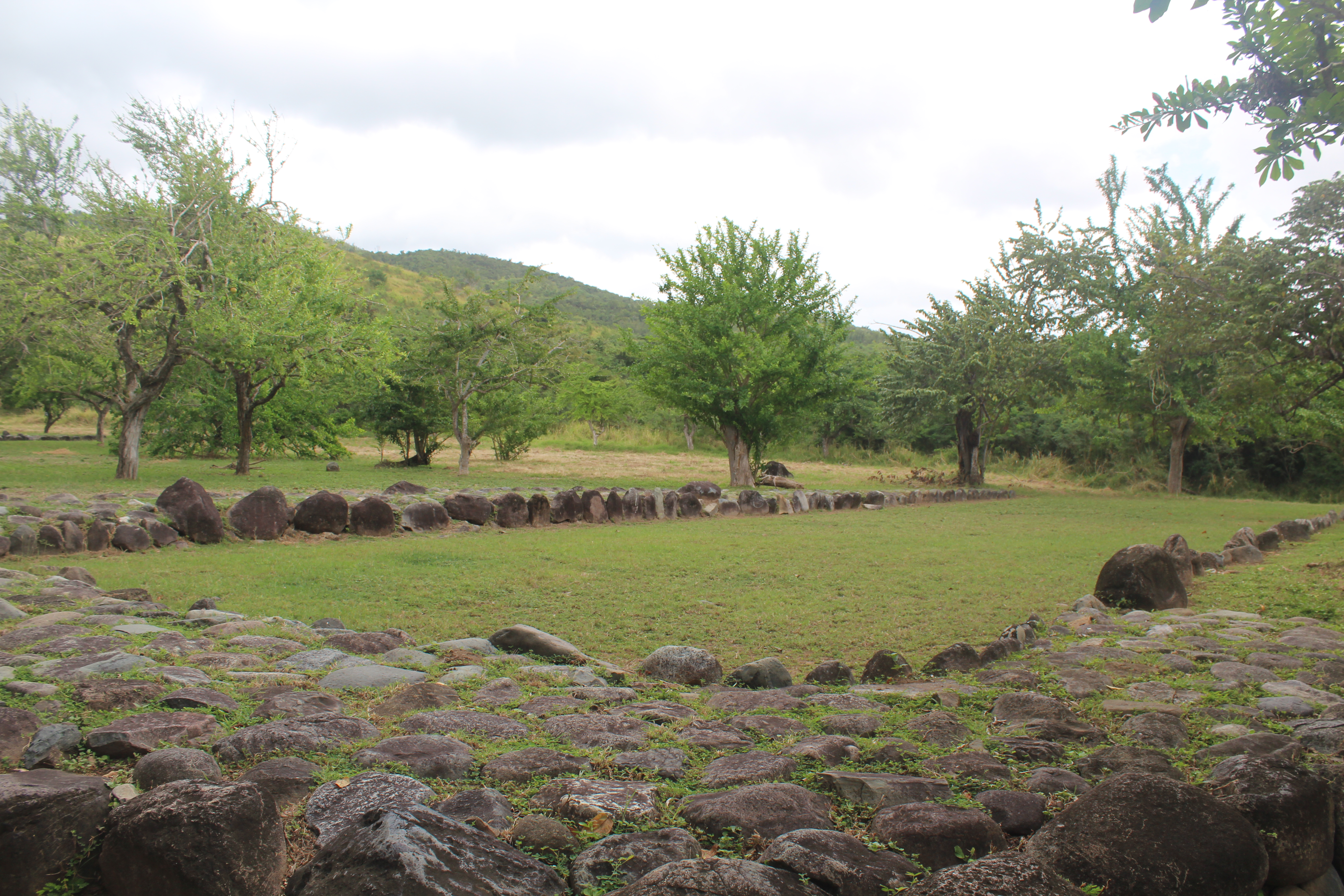
Batey at the site

The Centro Ceremonial Indigena at Tibes, Ponce, Puerto Rico, was discovered during the days after heavy rain downpours. The survey was conducted by the Sociedad Guaynia de Arqueologia e Historia and was sponsored by the Puerto Rico Institute of Culture. Clearing the area's high brush revealed a number of shell middens, as well as the major features of the site which were the carefully laid out stone constructions traditionally referred to as ball courts.

A total of seven ball courts and a quadrangular plaza are distributed throughout the site. Five of the ball courts are rectangular, consisting of two parallel lines of flat stones and open at both ends. The remaining two ball courts are U-shaped, bounded on each side by a walk paved with flat river cobbles and boulders. Another major feature of the site is a series of triangular stone arrangements surrounding a flat excavated area.

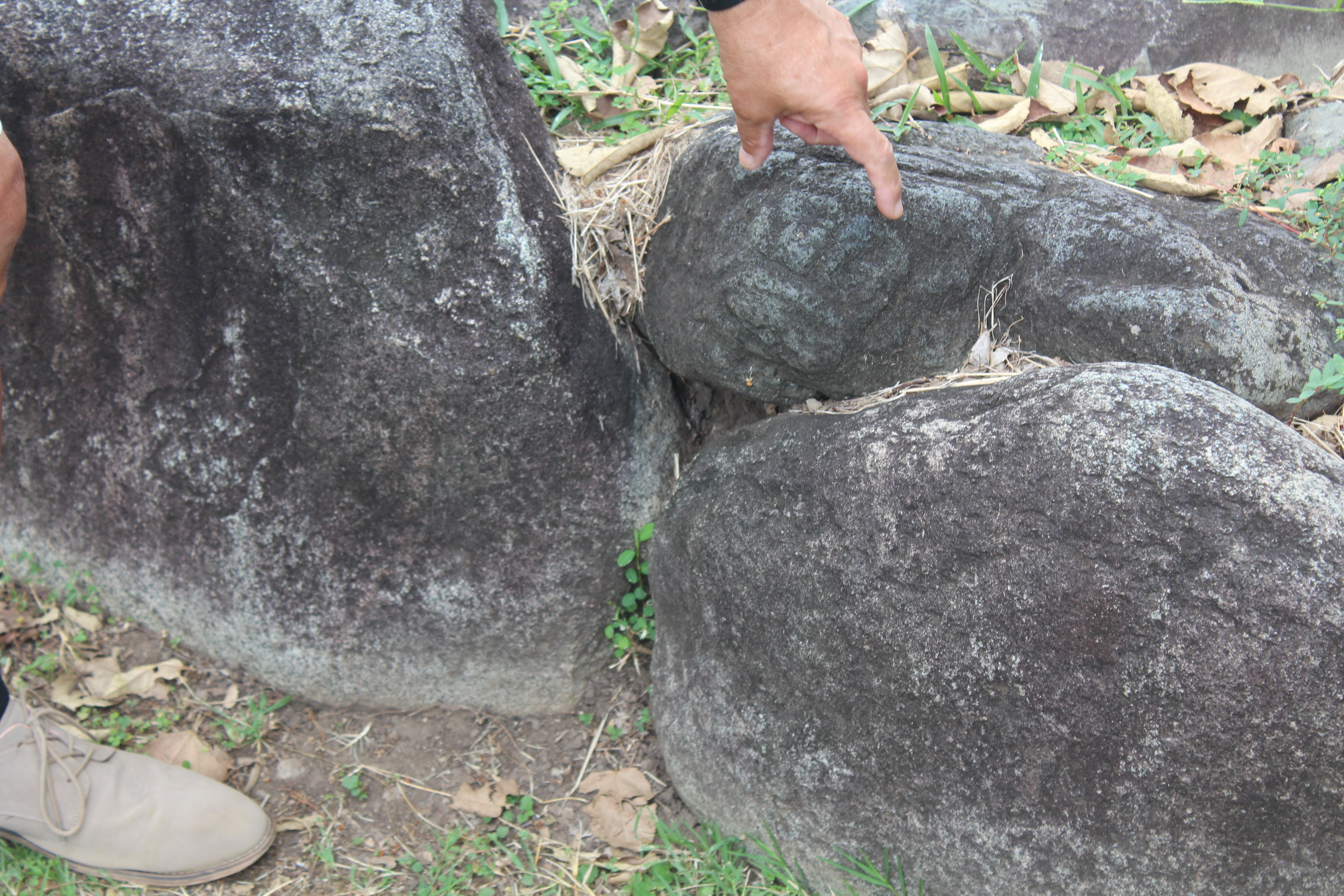
Petroglyph at one of the batey-hedge stones.

The main feature of the site is the nearly quadrangular enclosure which has been called a plaza. It is bounded on two sides by a walk paved with flat stones while the other two sides are defined with flat slabs. Many of the stones surrounding the plaza bear petroglyphs. The terrain within the ball courts and plaza have been artificially modified. Several shell middens are scattered irregularly throughout the site and is some instances the ball courts intrude into them, indicating that the site was occupied for an extended period of time with a gradual evolution into a ceremonial center.

A number of test pits have been excavated to establish an absolute and relative chronology as well as to define the potential for the site. These indicate that the site was originally occupied by the earliest agricultural immigrants into the greater Antilles, the Igneri. Radiocarbon dates and pottery analyses have revealed a continuous period of occupation between 400 AD and 1000 AD The last inhabitants of the site were presumably the Taínos.

== Pre-Columbian era ==
The Taínos who inhabited Puerto Rico before the arrival of Christopher Columbus in 1493, played a series of games which were both ceremonial and recreational, such as races, contests involving body strength and fishing. However, the two most important of these sports were the simulated warrior fights (similar to the gladiators) and ball playing.

=== Body strength games ===
According to the eyewitness account of Spanish historian Pedro Martir de Angleria, the body strength games were played in front of the whole village in the presence of the "Cacique" (Chief) and in some occasions an invited guest. Two teams would fight with bows and arrows in defense of their possessions as if they were enemies. In one of the events, recorded by Angleria, four men died and many others were injured in the space of one hour. The contest would come to an end only if the Cacique gave the ending signal.

=== Ball games ===
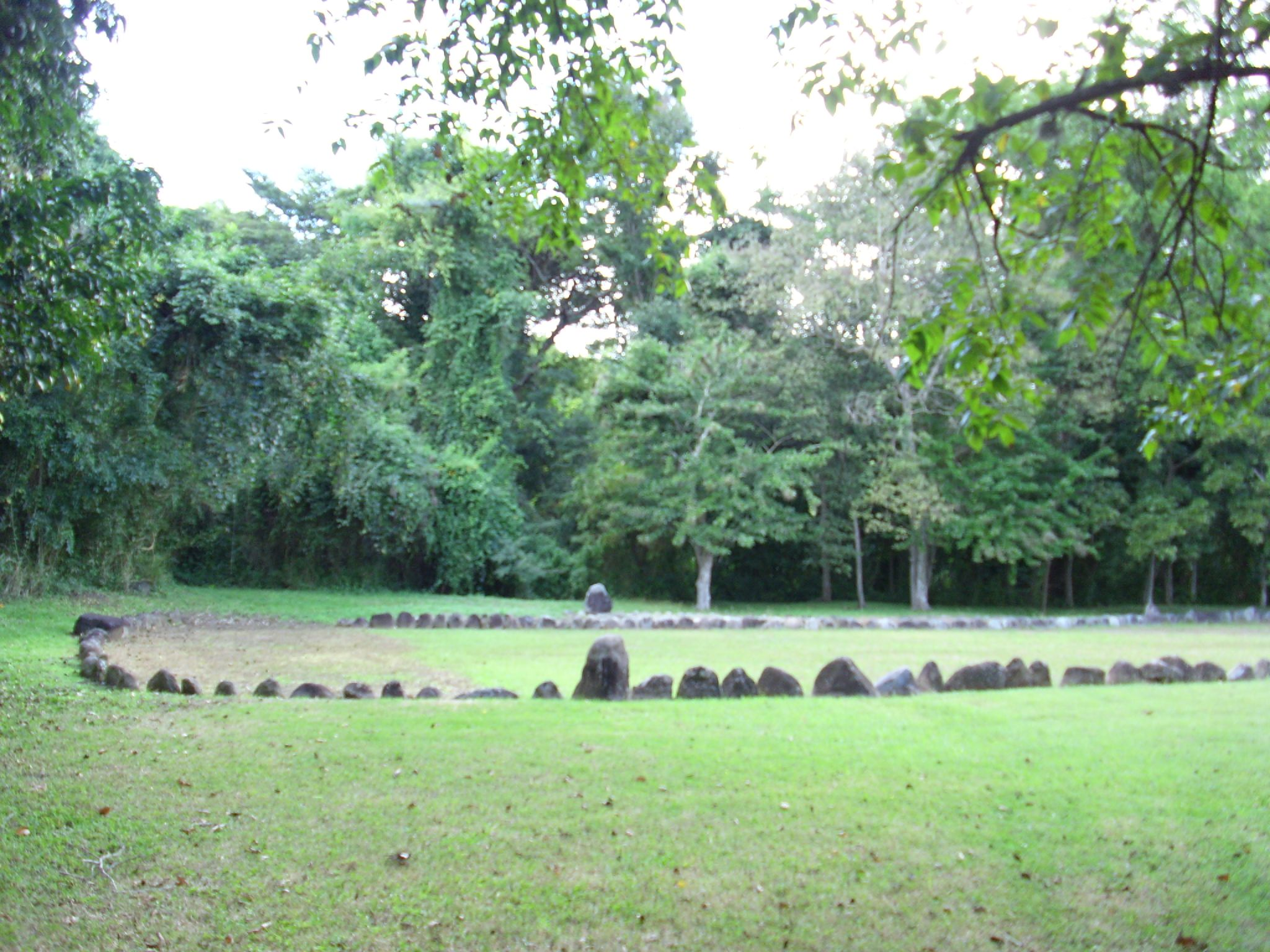
Batey court

The ball game, called "Batey", was played in the ceremonial ball court, which they also called a "Batey", situated in the middle of the village. The fields were either shaped like a triangle or like a "U". The ball was called Batu and made of rubber and vegetable leaves, which gave it flexibility. Two teams played against each other. One team to the west and the other to the east. The fathers and sons played on the opposite teams. The objective of the game was to keep the ball in constant motion. The players were allowed to use their heads, elbows, shoulders and knees. The team would lose a point, if for any reason the ball stopped moving. The score was kept with a mark on the ground and the game would end after the losing team received a certain number of points. The winners were treated like heroes and the losers were sacrificed. The game had changed by the time the first Spanish settlers arrived. According to Fray Bartolomé de las Casas the game was played in the following manner: "One team served the ball and the other team returned it, using anything but the hands. If the ball arrived at shoulder height, it was returned like lightning. When it came in near the ground, the player rapidly hit the ground, striking the ball with his buttocks. Play continued from side to side until an error was made.

== Discovery ==
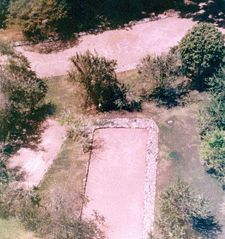
View of the Indigenous ballparks at Centro Ceremonial Indígena de Tibes

The site was discovered in 1975 in the aftermath of Hurricane Eloise. In that year, archaeologists from the Guaynia Society of Archaeology and History at the Pontificia Universidad Católica de Puerto Rico, members of the Archaeological Society of the Southwest, announced the discovery of the ruins of a "Batey" in barrio Tibes, on the northern outskirts of the city of Ponce. A total of 9 ball fields were discovered buried under thick forest overgrowth, dating back to AD 25 in the area which is now known as "Centro Ceremonial Indigena de Tibes" (The Tibes Indigenous Ceremonial Center). The fields varied in size from 12.8 meters (42 ft) long by 10.9 meters (35.8 ft) wide to 35.1 meters (115 ft) long by 9.3 meters (30.5 ft) wide.

== Early inhabitants ==
According to archeologists, the ball parks and ceremonial centers were built by the Igneri Culture, a Pre-Taíno tribe which inhabited the island. Modern technology tells us that the area was populated in 25 AD and that the Igneri abandoned the area in 600 AD for some unknown reason or reasons. The Taínos populated the same area in 1000 AD.

According to archaeologist Osvaldo Garcia Goyco, there is evidence that some of the plazas are oriented in relation to the equinox and solstices of the four seasons of the year. This is not unusual since the Taínos cultivated their crops in accordance to their astrological observations. The Tibes Indigenous Ceremonial Center is the oldest astronomical observatory in the Caribbean.

=== Areyto ===
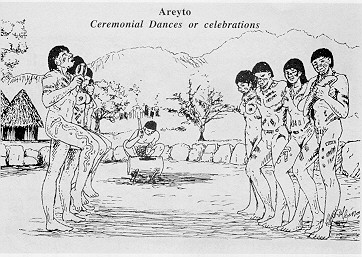
An Areyto Ceremony

The Taínos had their own culture, customs and governing structure. Besides using the fields for ball playing, they would also use the plazas to celebrate the "Areyto" which was a celebration consisting of telling an oral history told by singing and dancing accompanied by music. Most of the knowledge and information that we have about the traditions of the Taínos came about the personal observations and historical documentations of Fray Bartolomé de las Casas. Fray Bartolomé de las Casas described an "Areyto" in the following manner: "And on this island what I could understand was that their songs which they call "areytos", were their history passed from person to person, fathers to sons from the present to the future, as here uniting many Indians... passing three or four hours or more until the teacher or guide of the dance finished the history, and sometimes they went from one day to the next."

== Arrival of the Spaniards ==
When the Spaniards arrived on the island one of their first actions was to forcibly convert the Taínos into Christianity. They considered the ceremonial and religious practices of the Taínos as uncivilized and a form of paganism. The Taínos were enslaved and forced to build fortifications and to work the mines. Many died because of this harsh treatment, and also because of the introduction to diseases such as smallpox to the island by the Spaniards. However, before the Taíno tribes ceased to exist in Puerto Rico, Spanish historians such as Fray Bartolomé de las Casas, were able to witness and record the life and customs of these people.

== Ongoing work ==
The continued restoration of Tibes by archaeologists is not an easy one. The following are some factors that are taken into consideration:

- Previous archaeological work has been very limited, despite the uncovering and "restoration" of many of the stone alignments.
- Much of the site has yet to be explored and a number of other stone alignments are known to exist outside the mowed area.
- Except in the burial area, previous excavations have been confined to test pits rather than more extensive, areal exposures.
- Previous work has been largely on the bateys rather than the spaces between where ethnohistoric sources suggest houses may have stood. Careful excavation in these places may reveal post holes and hut foundations, as well as refuse disposal areas.
- The pottery at the site spans nearly the entire ceramic history of Puerto Rico and it would be surprising not to find some evidence of Archaic peoples at Tibes also. No other similar site has such a long sequence of material.
- An accurate and detailed topographic map may reveal other features that suggest artificial terracing.

== See also ==
- Ball Court/Plaza Sites of Puerto Rico and the U.S. Virgin Islands
- List of museums in Ponce, Puerto Rico
- National Register of Historic Places listings in Ponce, Puerto Rico
- List of archaeological sites sorted by country
- Taínos
