= Caguana, Utuado, Puerto Rico =

Barrio of Puerto Rico

Caguana
- Barrio
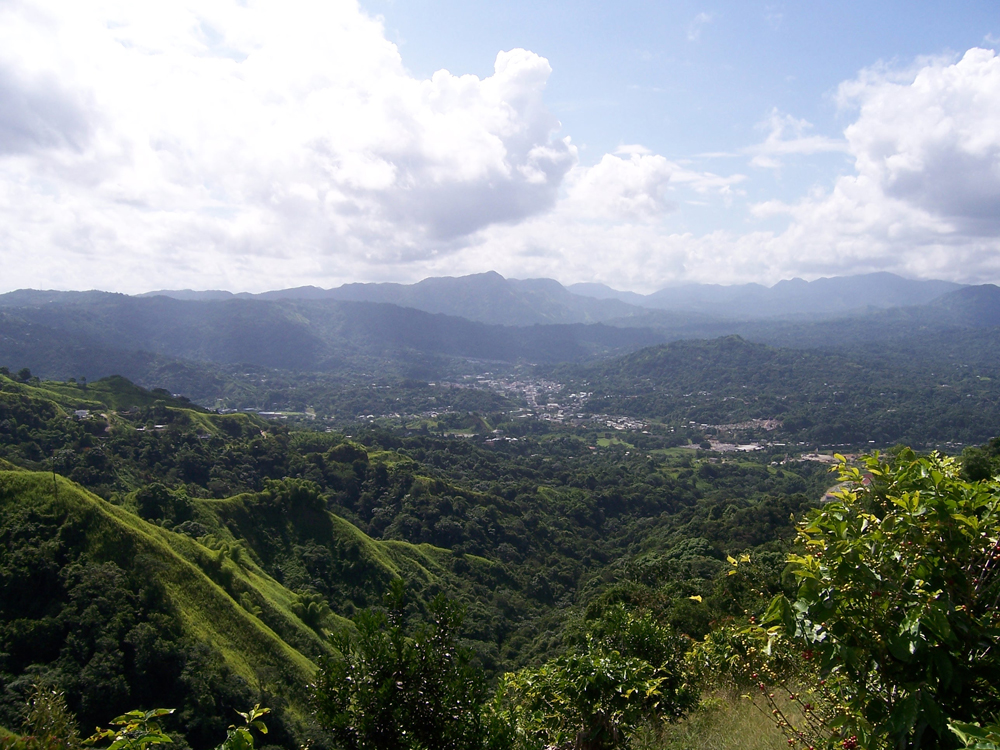
- View of Utuado Pueblo from Caguana

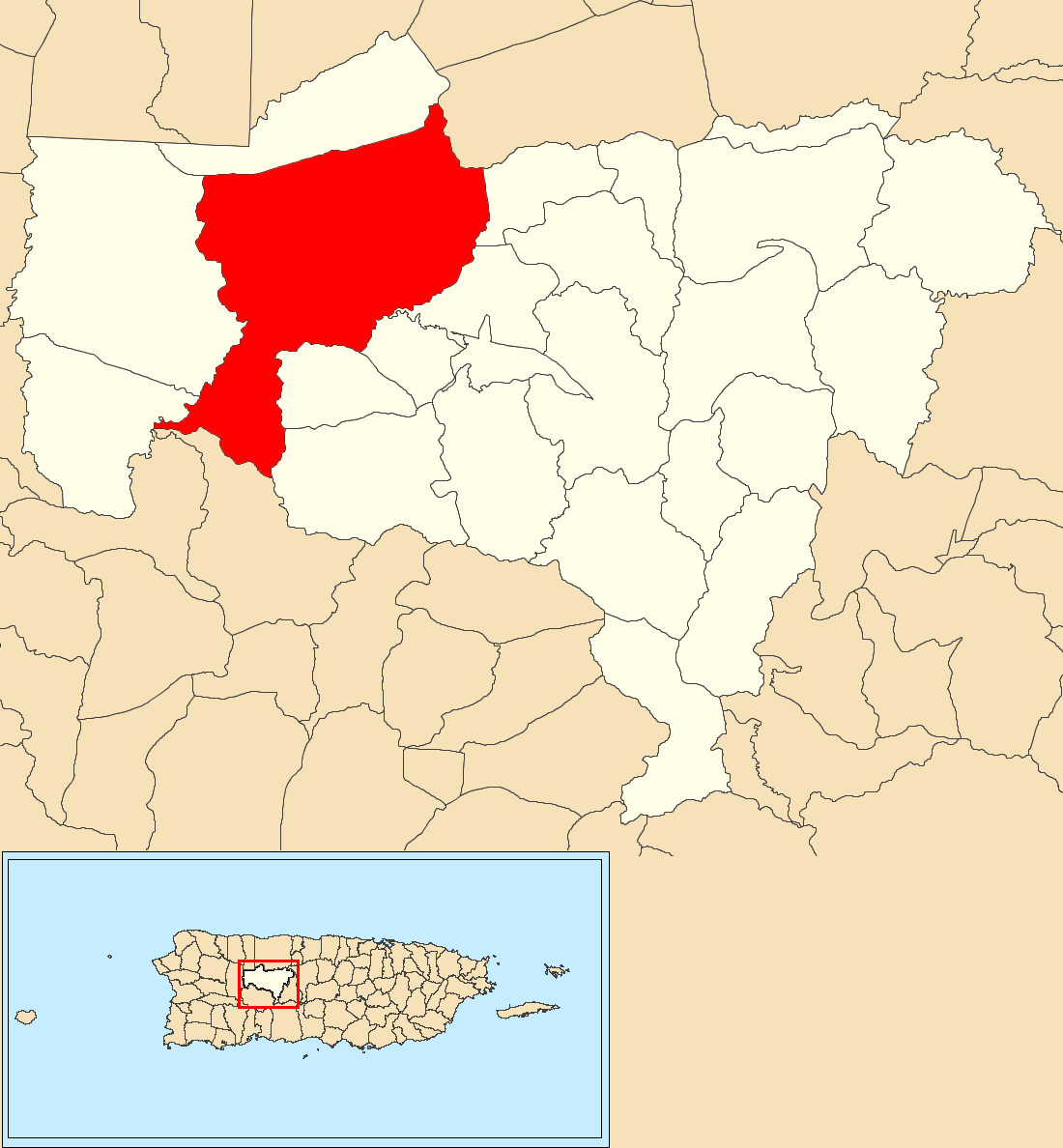
- Location of Caguana within the municipality of Utuado shown in red

- Location of Puerto Rico
- Coordinates: 18°17′45″N 66°44′49″W
- Commonwealth: Puerto Rico
- Municipality: Utuado

Area
  - Total: 15.57 sq mi (40.3 km^{2})
  - Land: 15.56 sq mi (40.3 km^{2})
  - Water: 0.01 sq mi (0.026 km^{2})
- Elevation: 1,302 ft (397 m)

Population (2010)
  - Total: 4,009
  - Density: 257.6/sq mi (99.5/km^{2})
- Source: 2010 Census
- Time zone: UTC−4 (AST)

Caguana is a barrio in the municipality of Utuado, Puerto Rico. Its population in 2010 was 4,009.

== Geography ==
Caguana is situated at an elevation of 1,302 feet (397 m) south of Santa Rosa in Utuado, Puerto Rico. It has an area of 15.57 square miles (40.3 km^{2}) of which 0.01 square miles (0.026 km^{2}) is water.

== History ==
It is one of the few municipalities of Puerto Rico to have an ancient area for Mesoamerican ballgames, called Batéy games, in the Caribbean. The Caguana Ceremonial Ball Courts Site in Utuado preserves the site where the Taíno people lived. The Tanamá River goes through Caguana, Utuado.

Caguana was in Spain's gazetteers until Puerto Rico was ceded by Spain in the aftermath of the Spanish–American War under the terms of the Treaty of Paris of 1898 and became an unincorporated territory of the United States. In 1899, the United States Department of War conducted a census of Puerto Rico finding that the population of Caguana barrio was 2,555.

Historical population
Census	Pop.	Note	%±
1900	2,555		—
1910	2,492		−2.5%
1920	2,768		11.1%
1930	3,068		10.8%
1940	3,491		13.8%
1950	4,153		19.0%
1960	3,607		−13.1%
1970	3,324		−7.8%
1980	3,913		17.7%
1990	3,723		−4.9%
2000	4,247		14.1%
2010	4,009		−5.6%
U.S. Decennial Census; 1899 (shown as 1900) 1910-1930; 1930-1950 1980-2000 2010

== Gallery ==
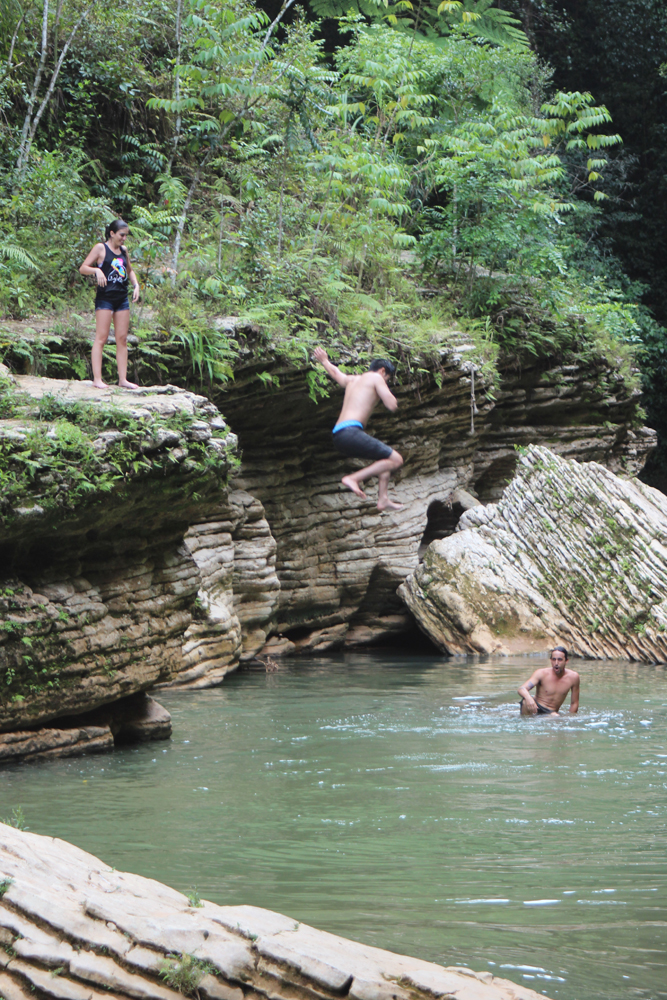
Tourists in the Tanamá River near PR-111 in Caguana

== See also ==
- List of communities in Puerto Rico
