= Golden Rock (archaeological site) =

Caribbean archeological site

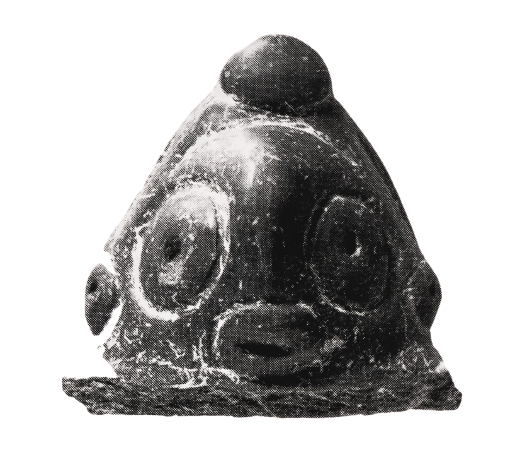
Adorno, Saladoid pottery excavated at the Golden Rock site Sint Eustatius Dutch Caribbean in the 1980s

Golden Rock is the name of an archaeological site in the centre of the island of Sint Eustatius, Dutch Caribbean, named after a nearby former plantation. Golden Rock was the nickname of Sint Eustatius from its prominence as a major colonial trading port in the late 17th and early 18th century. The site contains the remains of a late Saladoid village, an African burial ground, and a village of enslaved Africans.

== Saladoid culture ==
In 1923, the first proof that once Indigenous peoples of the Americas lived on Sint Eustatius was found by J.P.B. de Josselin de Jong, an ethnologist from the National Museum of Ethnology in Leiden, the Netherlands. The remains of a Saladoid village were found in the middle of the culture plain at five locations around the present airport. De Josselin de Jong called the cluster the Golden Rock site.

In 1984, a large-scale archaeological research started that continued up to 1987. 2800 square meter was investigated, the largest pre-Columbian excavation in the Lesser Antilles at that time. Two structures circular in shape were found just north of the midden, a very large one and a smaller one. The research showed that the most probable function of the large house in the pre-Columbian era was that of a maloca.

During the excavations the remains of nine Indigenous individuals were unearthed. These human remains had since been stored in a depot of Leiden University in the Netherlands and were repatriated to Sint Eustatius in March 2023.

== African diaspora culture ==
In June 2021, an international team of archaeologists began excavations at possibly the largest African burial site in the Caribbean apart from the Newton Slave Burial Ground in Barbados. The location of this burial site was in the same area as the Amerindian archaeological finds. The burial ground was part of the former plantation Golden Rock, one of the largest plantations of Sint Eustatius in the colonial era and also located in the central plain.

The Golden Rock excavations were halted due to protests by the local community who were deliberately not informed as concluded by a research commissioned by the Sint Eustatius government.
