= Sotillo Municipality, Monagas =

Sotillo Municipality Municipio Sotillo
- Municipality
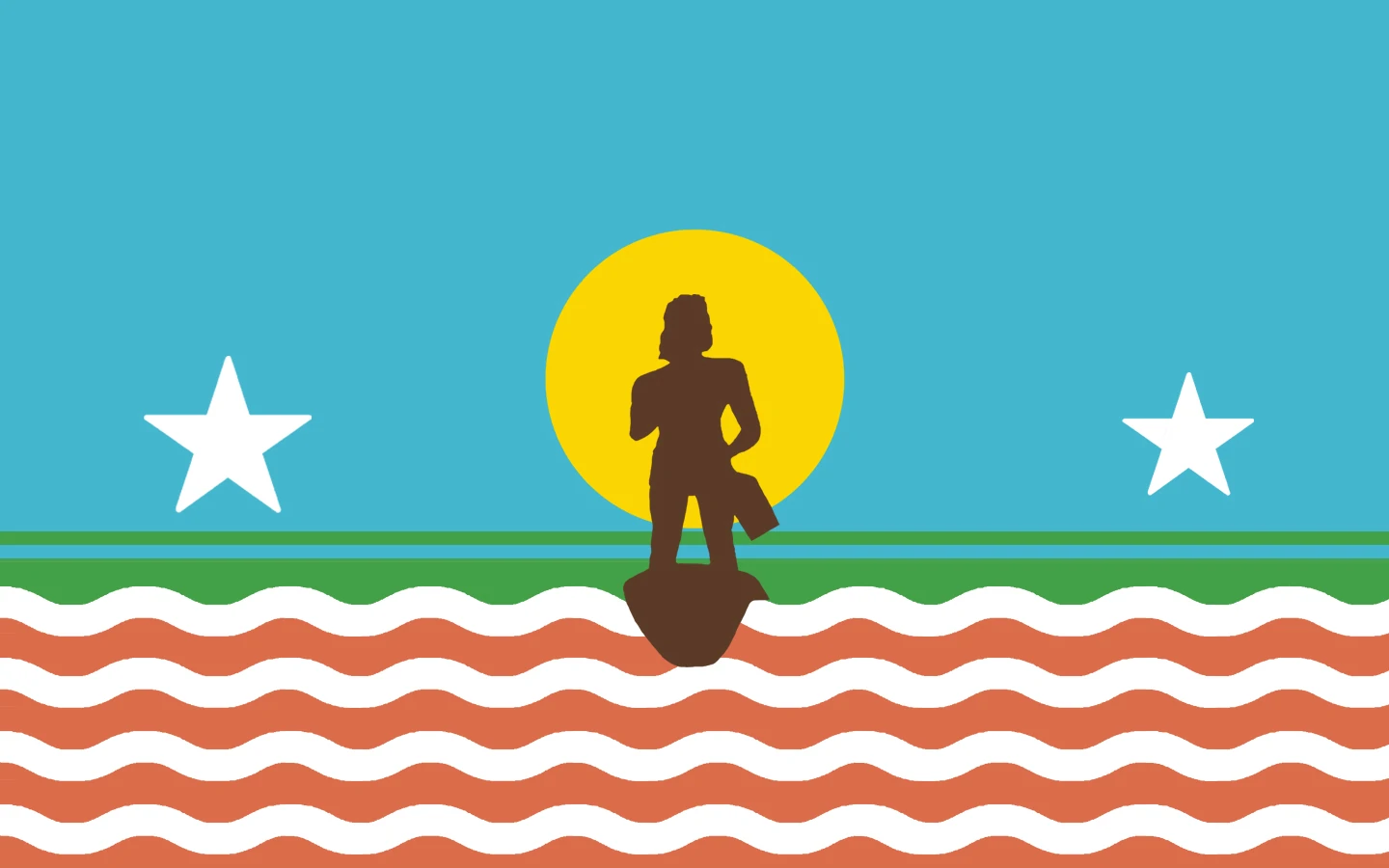
- Flag

- Location in Monagas

- Location in Venezuela
- Coordinates: 8°38′15″N 62°23′29″W
- Country: Venezuela
- State: Monagas
- Founded: 1732
- Municipal seat: Barrancas del Orinoco

Government
  - Mayor: José Maldonado (PSUV)

Area
  - Total: 1,709.7 km^{2} (660.1 sq mi)
- Time zone: UTC−4 (VET)

Sotillo is one of the 13 municipalities of the state of Monagas, Venezuela. The municipality's capital is Barrancas del Orinoco.

== Geography ==
The municipality has an area of 1,939 km^{2}.

== Economy ==
The economy is based in farm, raising, fishing and the oil industry.

== Culture ==
=== Cuisine ===
Something typical in the municipality is the Coporo stew or in coconut, the coporo is a river fish. As an important drink of the municipality and the south of Monagas, is the Ron con ponsigué, is an alcoholic beverage.

== Government ==
=== Mayors ===
- José Berroteran. (2008—2013). PSUV.
- Francisco Rascanelli. (2004—2008), (2013—2017). PSUV.
