= Taíno archaeology =

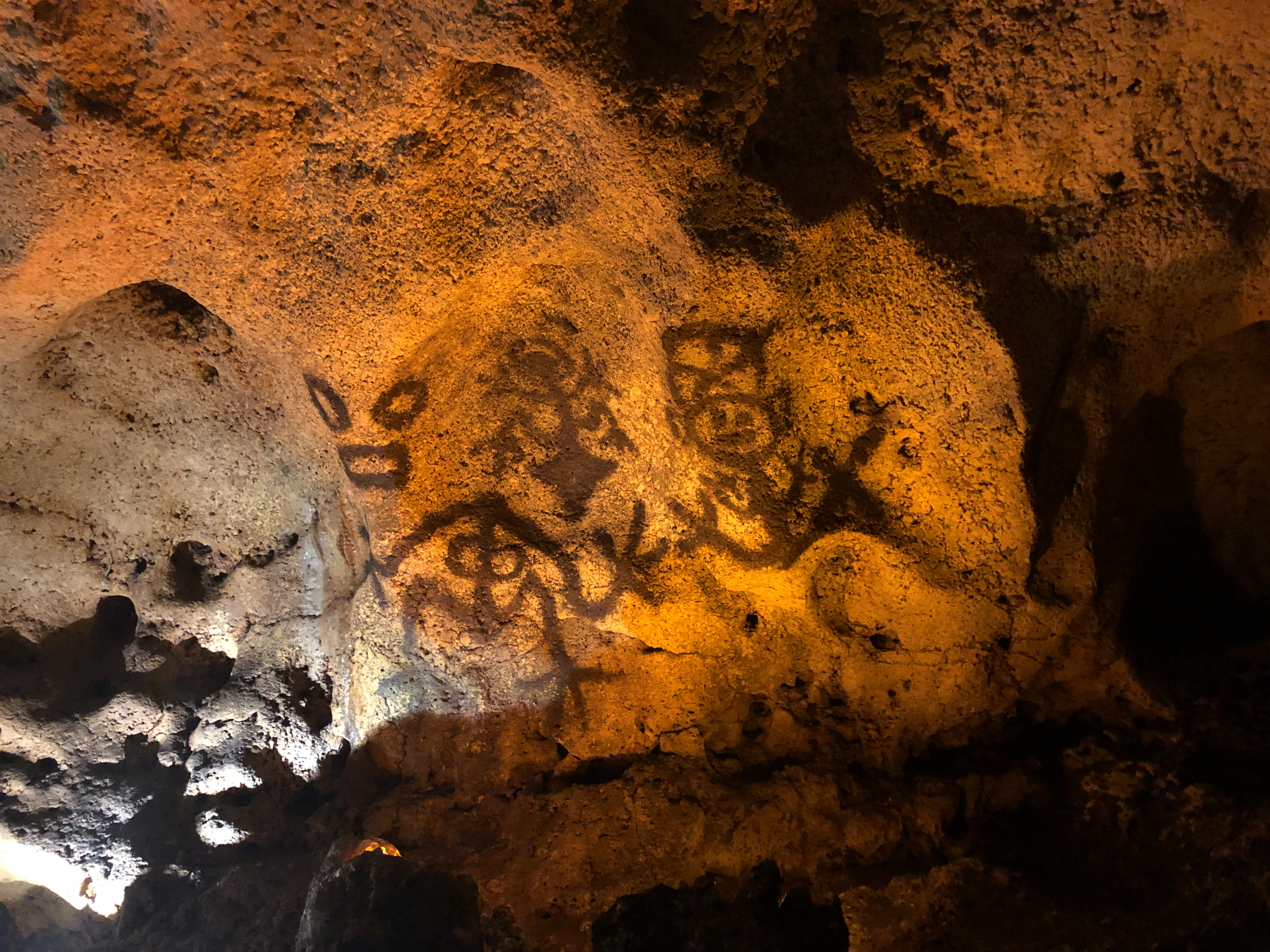
Taíno pictographs in Cuevas de las Maravillas, the Dominican Republic

The Indigenous peoples of the Caribbean belonged to multiple peoples, including the Kalinago, the Ciguayos, the Macorix, the Taino, and others. The Taíno were the Indigenous people of parts of the Caribbean and the principal inhabitants of Cuba, Hispaniola (today the Dominican Republic and Haiti), Jamaica, and Puerto Rico. Early Spanish colonization in the Caribbean has been relatively well documented, with textual evidence that has driven interpretations about the Indigenous peoples of the Caribbean in academic literature. Recent archaeological findings in Puerto Rico, Cuba, and the Dominican Republic have helped document Taíno archaeology. Indigenous archaeological sites in Lesser Antilles are often Kalinago archaeological sites.

== Puerto Rican archaeology ==
In Puerto Rico, the land was initially populated by a pre-agricultural people during a period of occupation known as the Archaic. The most significant data to be released from this period of occupation comes from the Maria del la Cruz cave; located on the northeastern side of the coastal town of Loiza. Typically, this period is characterized “by the absence of agriculture and pottery, semi-nomadic living in small bands, [with] frequent use of caves for shelter and burials ... [and] crude artifacts made of conch shells, flint and other stones.” In Puerto Rico, the Archaic period is recognized by pebble-grinders, pitted hammer stones, and pebble chopper. With these discoveries, recent carbon samples were obtained from the Maria de la Cruz cave producing a date of 40±100 years CE.. This date would indicate the entrance of the Archaic period began around the beginning of the Christian era.

Archaeologist Chris Espenshade found a midden mound and 400 burials in south-central Puerto Rico in the municipality of Ponce. The burial site dates back to the research done in the Maria del la Cruz cave. The major occupations of the site were from 600 to 900 CE and from 1300 to 1500 CE. Espenshade states the site contained “the presence of apparently extra-local pottery made by many different potters, the presence of extra-local faunal resources (including marine shellfish), the presence and use of pine resin from an off-island source, the strong representation of medicinal and ceremonial plants, the presence of suspected high-status foods, and the evidence for gathering and properly preparing porcupine fish consistent with the expectations of public ceremonies rather than everyday domestic activities.

Archaeologist Ricardo Alegría discovered similar evidence in 1948 of some of the earliest recorded agriculture and pottery remains at another site on the island known as the Hacienda Grande. Hacienda Grande is a culture that flourished from 250 BCE to 300 CE. The main site in which Hacienda Grande culture was studied was in Loíza. The pottery in the area were characterized as “thin, hard, and fine-grained [sherds]… with varied, but bell-shaped bowls and flat-based bottles. These pottery findings, which are considered some of the best in Puerto Rico, represent the "earliest immigration of pottery-making Indians into the island." Similar 'white-on-red' pottery has been found in the Virgin Islands, the Lesser Antilles, Trinidad, and the Orinoco region of Venezuela.

Punta Ostiones Site is an archaeological site located in or near Punta Ostiones, in the southwestern Puerto Rican municipality of Cabo Rojo, Puerto Rico. Punta Ostiones was added to the United States National Register of Historic Places on August 25, 2004, due to being one of the type sites of the Ostionoid culture (600–1500 CE), a Pre-Columbian archaeological culture represented by the Taíno people during its latter stages.

Punta Ostiones deposits have been impacted by natural and cultural processes, nevertheless the site still possess the integrity aspects of location, design, materials and association.

The Playa Vieja site is an archaeological site located in Punta Arenas in the Puerto Rican island-municipality of Vieques. The site was first uncovered in 1978 by a Navy-sponsored archaeological survey led by Marvin Keller, and later archaeological surveys in 1980 uncovered additional prehistoric material including 2,738 artifacts and additional biological human evidence belonging to the Saladoid and Ostionoid cultures. The site has been listed in the National Register of Historic Places since 1992 and it is located within the borders of the Vieques National Wildlife Refuge.

The Huecoid culture collection (230 BCE - 1430 CE) comes from excavations in the La Hueca neighborhood, on the Sorcé farm, in Vieques island. Archaeologists Yvonne Narganes Storde and Luis Chanlatte Baik managed to recover a wide variety of artifacts such as amulets, as well as beads and ornaments made of semiprecious stones. The presence of these pieces points to a complex social organization and mastery of stone and shell carving. The ceramic of their vessels exhibit a limited variety in shapes and decorative patterns. The decorative technique is modeling, incising with the cross-hatching variant, which they generally filled with a white or red paste.

== Dominican archaeology ==
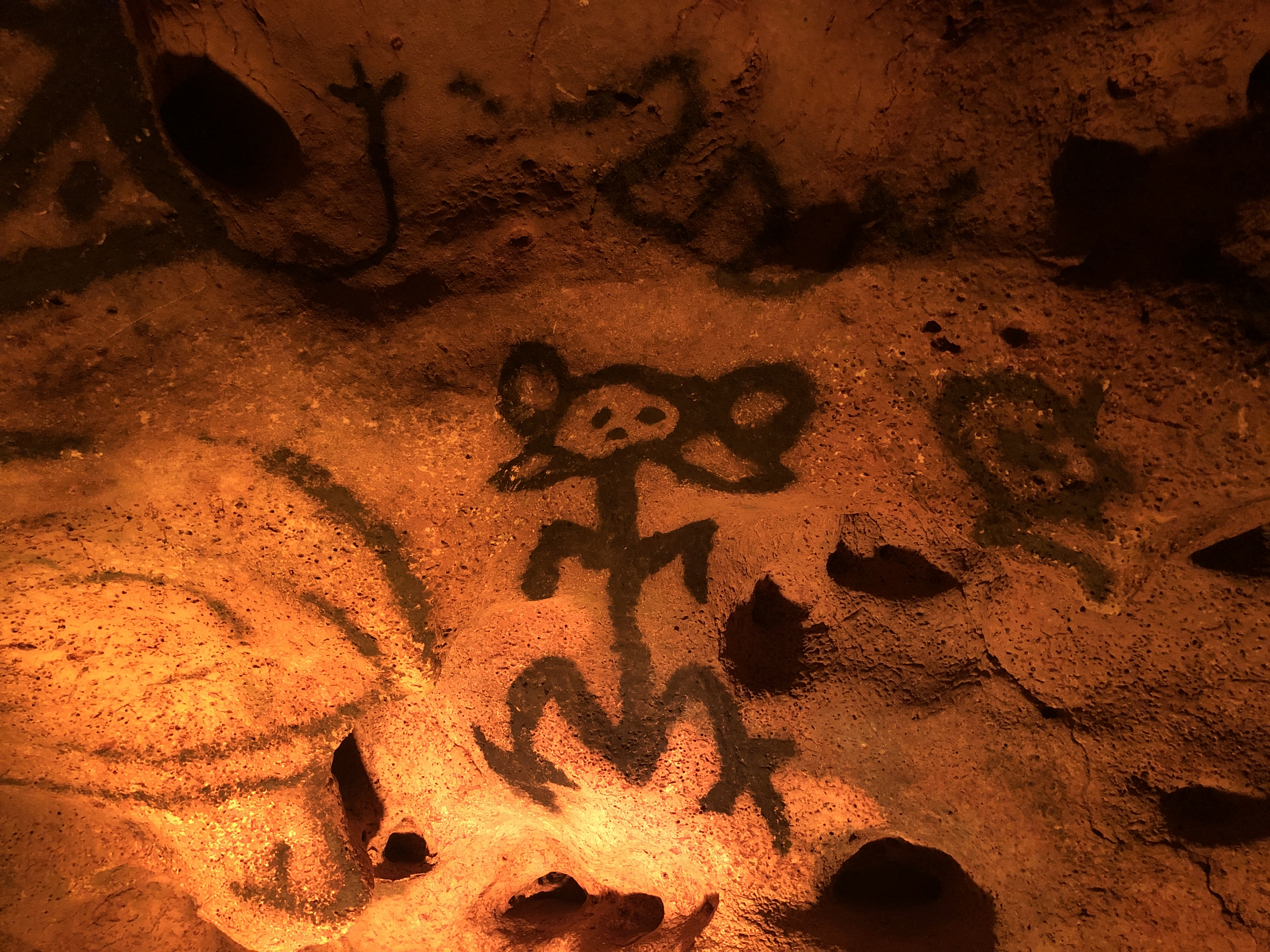
Taíno pictographs in Cuevas de las Maravillas, the Dominican Republic

Historian Frank Moya Pons states during the early period of Spanish colonization in the Dominican Republic a process "of transculturation began whereby Taíno people mixed with the Spanish population, together with African slaves, giving rise to a new Creole culture."

The most notable Taíno site in the Dominican Republic is on the southeastern coast of the island at the mouth of the Yuma River known as El Atajadizo. The ceramics at this site include flint, coral, and stone tools dating back to about 300 BCE. According to researchers, multiple layers of occupation have given way to the development of a very large village about 1300 ACE old; centered by a cobblestone-paved plaza surrounding by public buildings.

Another notable Taíno site is Chacuey, found on the northwestern side of the island along the Chacuey River. This site is well-known for its petroglyphs and impressive stonework of extensive enclosed plazas and sophisticated roadways. The plaza is approximately 600 meters long and enclosed by standing stones covered in petroglyphs of human-like faces leading to the river.

== Cuban archaeology ==
In Cuba, the Archaic tradition is represented by the pre-ceramic findings of rock-shelters and coastal shell-midden sites. Therefore, some of the oldest sites on the island are located in caves and rock shelters on the interior valleys along the coast. These caves and shelters include ceramics like shell gouges, shell celts, vessels, and dishes made out of conch shells.

Levisa rock shelter, in the Levisa River valley, is the oldest found record of Archaic tools in Cuba dating to about 4000 BCE. At this site, there is evidence of stone tools, such as hammerstones, shell artifacts, polished stone balls, and pendants.

Most of the Taíno settlements in Cuba were located in the eastern part of the island. Example sites include La Campana, El Mango, and Pueblo Viejo archaeological sites, villages with large plazas and enclosed areas.

== See also ==
- Indigenous archaeology
- Indigenous languages of the Caribbean
- Indigenous peoples of the Caribbean
- Seafaring in the Pre-Columbian Caribbean
