= Barrancas del Orinoco =

- Interactive map of Barrancas del Orinoco
- Coordinates: 8°42′07″N 62°11′58″W
- Country: Venezuela
- State: Monagas
- Municipality: Sotillo

Barranca del Orinoco is the capital of the municipality of Sotillo in the state of Monagas in Venezuela.

== History ==
At the site where Barrancas is located today, archaeological objects and utensils have been found that belonged to the so-called Barrancoid and Saladoid cultures, the oldest of which have been dated to 1000 years before the Christian era. The archaeological evidence that has been found (and is still being found) has established that Barrancas has been continuously inhabited since at least the 11th century AD, making it the oldest town in Venezuela and one of the oldest on the American continent.

Diego de Ordaz, a Spanish explorer obsessed with finding the legendary site of El Dorado, arrived in the village in August 1531 after traveling up the Orinoco River via the Caño Manamo. Impressed by its number of inhabitants - which he estimated at "more than 400 bohíos" - he decided to descend and meet personally with the cacique "Naricagua", lord of his territories, whose name of the river "Uyapari" was associated with the village. The chronicler Juan de Castellanos, in his famous Elegies of Illustrious Men of the Indies, describes it as "a powerful town with a large crowd on the ravines of the Cacique de Uyapari lordship.

The Aragonese Capuchin friars began to arrive at the end of the 17th century and in 1790, Fray Joaquín de Morata founded the mission of San Rafael Arcángel de Barrancas with the help of aborigines of the Warao ethnic group and built a church. Because of the war of independence, the religious were forced to abandon the village, which nevertheless remained inhabited by the natives. Already in the 20th century, during the presidency of Juan Vicente Gómez, Barrancas experiences a remarkable growth with the arrival of entrepreneurs to install businesses and offer services associated with the growth of oil exploration and production in the Orinoco delta; by mid-century it had become an important cattle production center.

Under the direction of the Corporación Venezolana de Guayana, several hectares of Caribbean pine were planted between Barrancas and the nearby town of Uverito, an activity that significantly boosted the development of the area; By the 1970s it was the most important town and port in the state of Monagas, mainly due to the lack of road connections to the main nearby cities, such as Tucupita (Delta Amacuro) and Puerto Ordaz (Bolívar State), although today it continues to be an important center for the transport of goods and passengers to these cities. A significant part of the local economy has historically been fueled by informal trade with countries such as Guyana and Trinidad and Tobago.

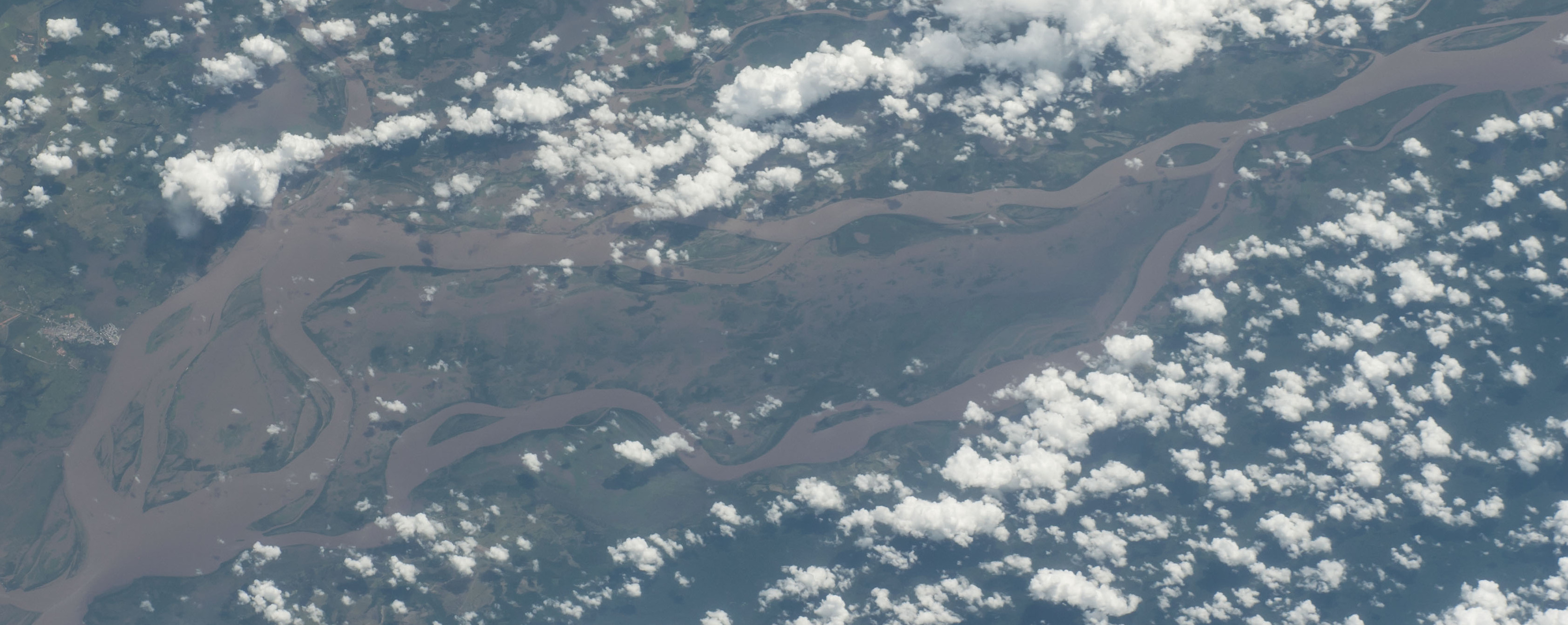
Barrancas del Orinoco (left), Orinoco Delta, islands, clouds

The cuisine typical is the arepa made with maize and river fish.
