= Callejones Site =

Prehistoric archeological site in Lares, Puerto Rico

- U.S. National Register of Historic Places
- Location: Address restricted
- Nearest city: Lares, Puerto Rico
- Area: less than one acre
- MPS: Ball court/plaza sites of Puerto Rico and the U.S. Virgin Islands
- NRHP reference No.: 99001022
- Added to NRHP: September 2, 1999

Callejones Site is an archaeological site consisting of a batey (a large clearing where ceremonies took place) located in Lares, Puerto Rico. It is of the Early Ostionoid (pre-Taino) (AD 600–1200) and Late Ostionoid (Taíno) (AD 1200–1500) prehistoric eras and has been researched by Jose Oliver, a researcher from Yale University, and by Samuel Kirkland Lothrop.

== See also ==
- Ball Court/Plaza Sites of Puerto Rico and the U.S. Virgin Islands
