= Hacienda Grande culture =

Culture that flourished in Puerto Rico from 250 BC to 300 AD

Hacienda Grande is a culture that flourished in Puerto Rico from 250 BC to 300 AD. The main site in which Hacienda Grande culture was studied was in Loíza.

== Characteristics ==
Similar to the Saladoid culture, out of Venezuela, the Hacienda Grande culture was known primarily for its ceramic works. Ceramic techniques include vessel forms, such as zoomorphic effigy vessels, platters, jars and bowls with D-shaped strap handles, and many other types of vessels. These potters decorated their vessels with polychrome designs mainly using white-on-red, black paint, and negative-painted designs. These pottery findings, which are considered some of the best in Puerto Rico, represent the "earliest immigration of pottery-making Indians into the island." Similar 'white-on-red' pottery has been found in the Virgin Islands, the Lesser Antilles, Trinidad, and the Orinoco region of Venezuela.

Though much of what we know about this culture is based on their ceramics, we do know that a principal part of not only their diet, but their society, was crab. The fact that an abundance of crab remains were discovered along with the pottery, combined with the fact that shell and shell artifacts are so rare, points directly to this site corresponding with what Froelich Rainey called "Crab culture."

== Historical context ==
Though this distinct style of pottery was found elsewhere, it did not travel any farther north or west than Puerto Rico. Evidence suggests that the Igneri immigration into the Greater Antilles was stopped due to a new group of invaders from South America. This theory is further supported by the fact that, rather than a slow shift from one ceramic style to another, the Hacienda Grande style of pottery and a diet based almost entirely on crabmeat abruptly stops, and with it, the Hacienda Grande culture as a whole.
