= Seafaring in the Pre-Columbian Caribbean =

Seafaring has played an important role in human history by enabling many prehistoric migrations across the world. Seafaring was especially important in the Caribbean as it was the only way to reach the Caribbean Islands. Current research has discovered that numerous Pre-Columbian colonisation events occurred in the Caribbean and that an important initial incentive to visit the Caribbean Islands may have been the search for high quality materials, such as flint, clams, oysters and other resources. Although only a limited amount of Pre-Columbian watercraft have been uncovered it has been possible to deduce the appearance and design of some Caribbean canoes. Historical sources offer many descriptions regarding the appearance and use of Amerindian canoes; however, it is difficult to assess to what extent the Caribbean canoes from the 15th century AD are similar to their counterparts of 5000 years earlier.

== Difficulties of prehistoric seafaring ==
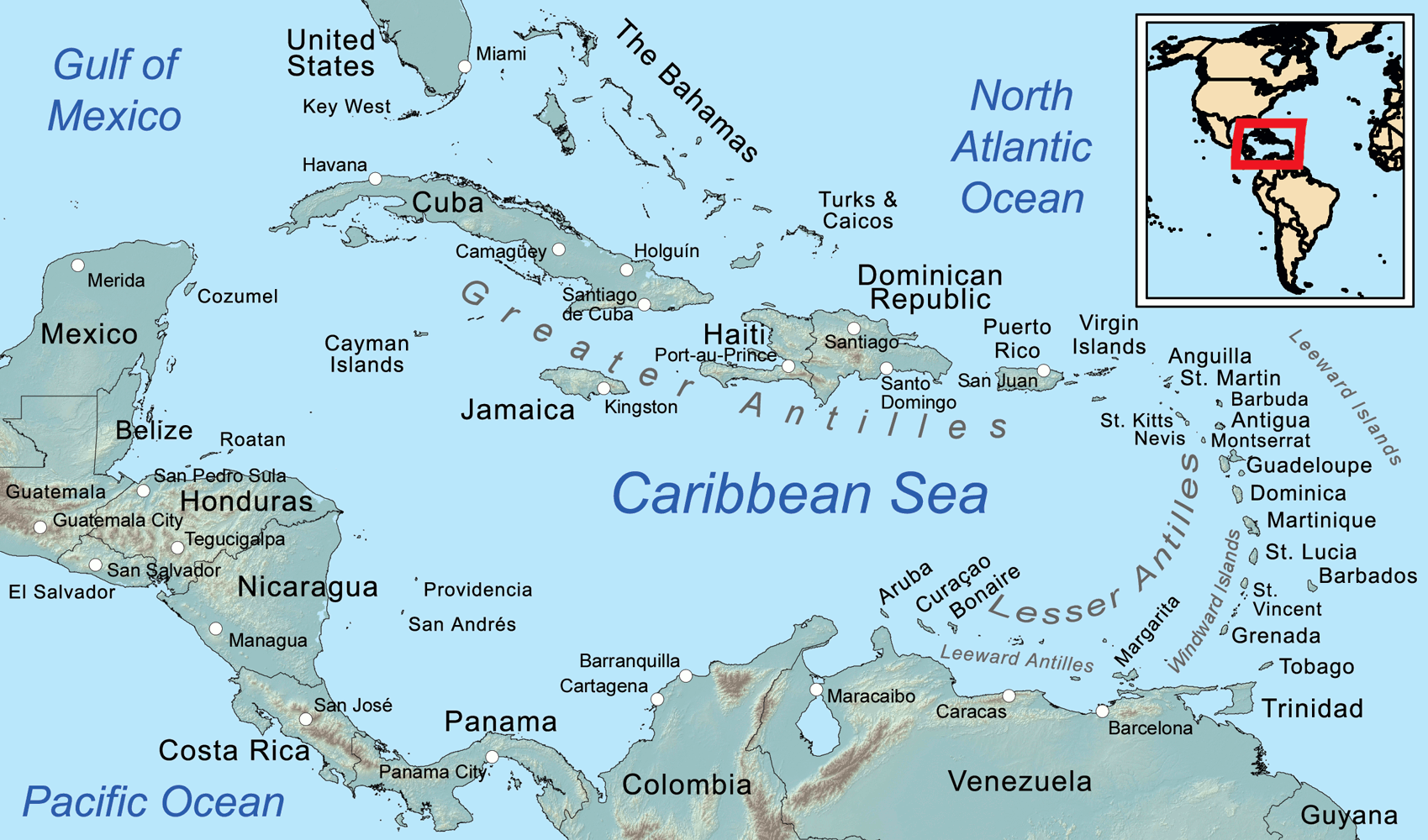
Islands in and near the Caribbean

The sea has enabled increased human mobility and interaction over the past thousands of years. This is especially true in the Caribbean, where seafaring was the only way to reach the Caribbean Islands from the mainland. The Caribbean Islands are commonly grouped into the Greater Antilles and Lesser Antilles and the Lucayan Archipelago. Geographically, the Caribbean Sea is bounded by two archipelagoes – the Greater Antilles to the north and the Lesser Antilles to the east – and by northern South America to the south and the North American continent to the west.

Prehistoric seafaring is a difficult topic to understand, regardless of the geographic region, because of the lack of ethnographic or ethnohistoric records, and the lack of archaeological sources. Prehistoric seafaring artefacts, such as canoes and canoe paddles were constructed of wood and thus often degraded over time, leaving no evidence of their original appearance, design and construction method. However, the presence of similar archaeological artefacts in different regions, separated by bodies of water, proves that contact through seafaring existed.

== Pre-colonial human dispersal models in the Caribbean ==
The geographic formation of the Caribbean Islands resembles an arc of scattered stepping stones with end points close to North, Central and South America. This has inevitably raised questions regarding timing, pattern and tempo of human dispersal in the Caribbean, which has been a topic of debate for more than a century. Due to the close proximity of numerous Caribbean Islands to each other, first interpretations of Pre-Columbian seafaring and migration were based on a stepping-stone model. This model stated that human groups entered the islands close to the mainland, after which people moved to other islands increasingly distant from the continental landmasses. Current research tends to move away from the stepping-stone model in favour of the southward route hypothesis. The southward route hypothesis proposes that the northern Antilles were settled directly from South America followed by progressively southward movements into the Lesser Antilles. This hypothesis has been supported by both radiocarbon dates and seafaring simulations.

== Earliest settled islands ==
The first Caribbean island to have been settled was Trinidad, where the earliest archaeological finds date from 8000 BCE. Given the lower sea levels in the Late Pleistocene and Early Holocene it is likely that Trinidad was close enough to the South American mainland to allow settlement that would not have necessarily required a watercraft. Thus the early migration of Trinidad should be considered differently when compared to the migration of other Caribbean Islands. With the help of radiocarbon dating Napolitano and colleagues (2019) have discovered two distinct clusters of Caribbean colonisation, from ca. 3850–550 BCE and 150–1450 AD. The first cluster represents two distinct population dispersals between 3850 and 550 BCE. Within this time frame the earliest settled islands are Cuba, Hispaniola and Puerto Rico in the Greater Antilles; Guadeloupe, Sint Maarten, Vieques, Saint Thomas, Barbuda, Antigua and Montserrat in the northern Lesser Antilles; Barbados and Grenada in the southern Lesser Antilles; and Aruba, Bonaire, Curaçao and Tobago, which are located in close proximity to the South American mainland. Further radiocarbon dates that were not used in the study by Napolitano and colleagues suggest that Haiti, the Dominican Republic and Mona Island in the Greater Antilles; Anguila, Saba, St. Kitts, Nevis, Marie-Galante and Martinique in the northern Lesser Antilles; and Margarita, Coche Island and Cubagua in the southern Lesser Antilles were also colonised in the time period from ca. 3850–550 BCE. Early paleoenvironmental evidence including evidence of man-made fires from numerous Caribbean Islands has shown that by approximately 3190 BCE many if not all islands in the Lesser Antilles up to Antigua were being visited, if not settled.

== Second cluster of colonisation ==
The second cluster of colonisation occurred between 150 and 1450 AD and represents a period in which Jamaica in the Greater Antilles and several islands in the northern Lesser Antilles, namely Saint John, Saint Eustatius, and Saint Lucia and Carriacou in the southern Lesser Antilles were colonised. This time frame also reflects multiple groups moving in various directions simultaneously, which is an expected outcome considering a logical increase in trade and exchange relationships.

The available data suggests that, especially during the first colonisation cluster, communities managed extensive subsistence and resource systems, likely guided by seasonality and intensive voyaging systems between islands and the mainland. Sea-based connection emerged between communities, which resulted in the development of social networks. In recent years experimental canoe voyages, network analysis of interactions between island communities and global seafaring modeling have been used to shed new light on this topic.

== Incentives for travelling ==
One initial incentive to travel from the mainland to the islands may have been the search for high-quality materials. For example, Flinty Bay on Antigua is one of the best known sources of high quality flint in the Lesser Antilles. Flint from Antigua has been discovered on many other Caribbean islands, which highlights the importance of this material during the Pre-Columbian period but also shows that many islands were connected to each other, at least through trade.

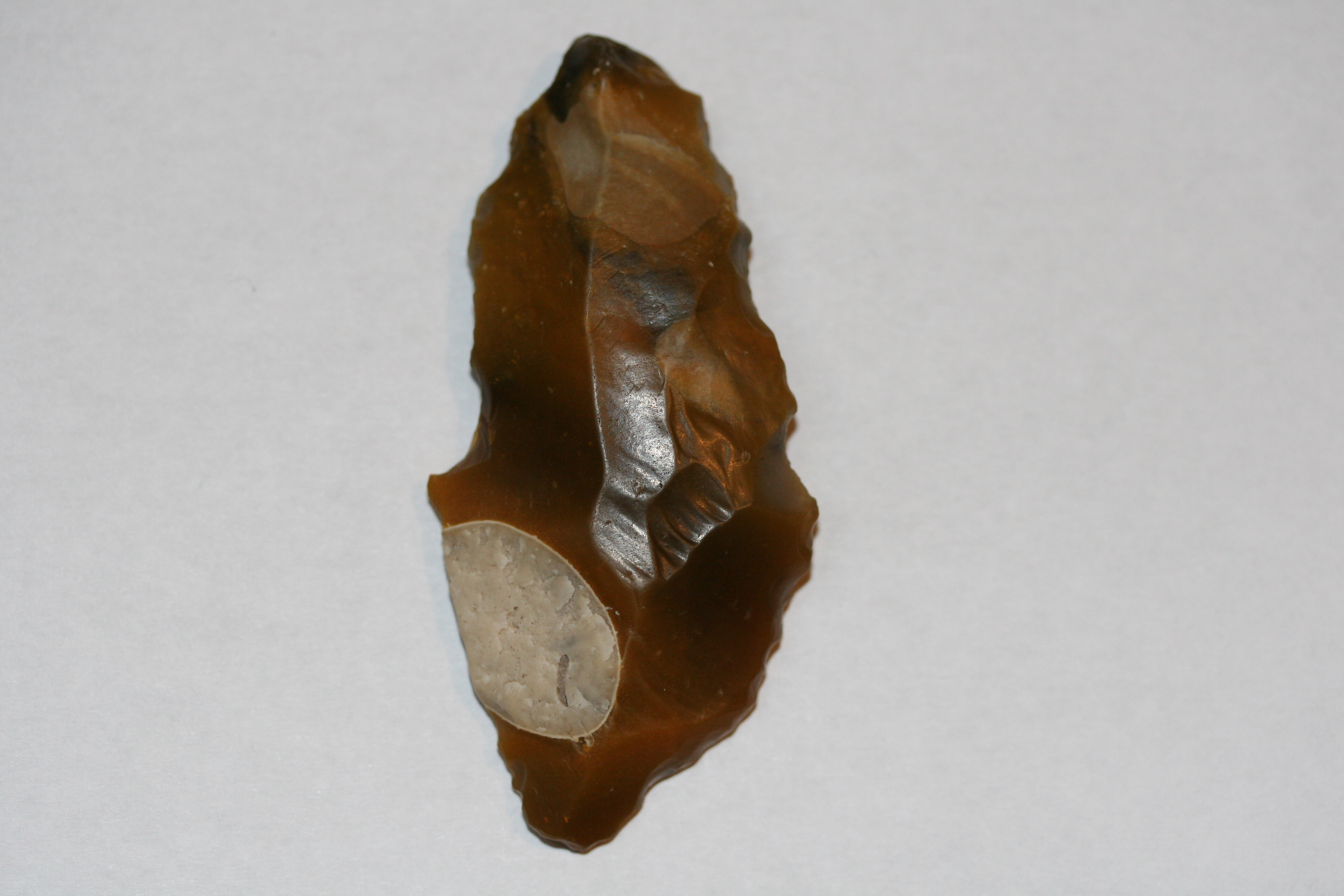
A flint tool from around 5000 BCE found in Plößnitz, Germany. Pre-Columbian flint tools will have looked similar.

Plum Piece on Saba is an example of an archaeological site that was visited seasonally in order to make use of local resources. At Plum Piece abundant remains of black crab (Gecarciunus ruricola) and Sargasso shearwater (Puffinus puffinus) were found in midden deposits. Three radiocarbon dates from the midden deposits have placed the site between 1875 and 1520 BCE. The breeding season of the Sargasso shearwater coincides with the spawning period of the black crab, between February and July. Furthermore, the tropical soils near the site provide good conditions for growing roots and crops, while numerous plants make the area well-suited for gathering nuts and seeds. It is possible that Plum Piece was visited in alternation with comparable campsites on nearby islands in a yearly mobility cycle determined by the seasonality and availability of resources. Pre-worked flint cores from Antigua have also been found on Saba, furthermore confirming the importance of this resource for the Caribbean Islands.

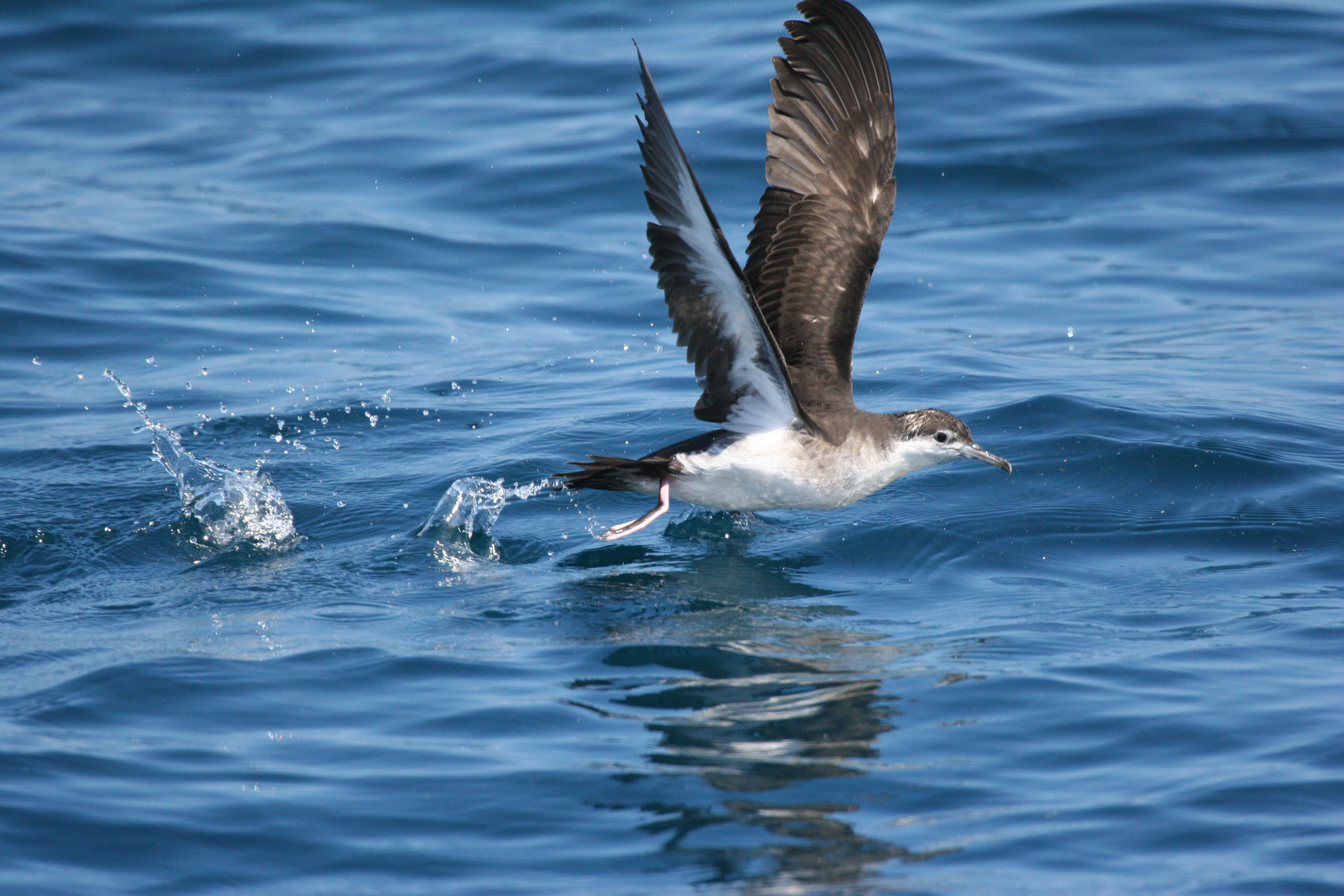
Sargasso Shearwater

A similar archaeological site has been uncovered at Spanish Water, Curaçao. At Spanish Water 14 shell deposits have been found in three different locations. Twelve shell and four radiocarbon samples point to an occupation and/or use of the site between 2900 BCE to 1650 AD. The numerous shell deposits have been interpreted as collecting and processing camps of various mangrove clams and oyster species. Investigations at Spanish Water have discovered that the meat recovered from the clams and oysters was not consumed directly but conserved to be exported.

Combining voyaging models with the aforementioned archaeological data has resulted in a better understanding of seafaring routes. For example, with the aid of voyaging models, it was determined that the quickest and safest period to travel from Plum Piece to Long Island was in July. For the return voyage from Long Island to Plum Piece it was determined that during January it would take the least amount of time. However, these models have also uncovered that a combination of pathways rather than direct island-to-island travel initially defined Pre-Columbian seafaring.

== Pre-Columbian canoes ==
The main evidence of Pre-Columbian seafaring is the presence of ceramics and other artefacts such as flint tools on Caribbean Islands. Very few archaeological examples of prehistoric Caribbean watercraft have been uncovered. The few cases of watercraft that have been found are dugouts constructed from a single log. There are several families of trees that could have been used to construct Caribbean canoes. These include woods of the mahogany family (Meliaceae) such as the Cuban mahogany (Swietenia mahagoni), that can reach heights of 30–35 m, the ceiba family (Malvaceae) such as Ceiba pentandra, than can grow up to 60–70 m tall and the cedar family such as the red cedar (Cedrela odorata) that can grow up to 60 m in height. It is likely that these canoes were built in a variety of sizes. Ranging from fishing canoes, holding one or a few individuals, to larger ones able to carry as many as a few dozen people that could have been used to reach the Caribbean Islands from the mainland. Reports by historical chroniclers claim to have witnessed a canoe "containing 40 to 50 Caribs [...] when it came out to trade with a visiting English ship". During Columbus' first voyage he summarised the appearance and use of canoes:

"They have in all these islands very many canoes like our row-boats; some larger, some smaller, but most of them larger than a barge of eighteen seats. They are not so wide, because they are made of one simple piece of timber, but a barge could not keep up with them in rowing because they go with incredible speed, and with these canoes they navigate among these islands, which are innumerable, and carry on their traffic. I have seen in some of these canoes seventy and eighty men, each with his oar".

Even if Columbus' descriptions are accurate they represent Caribbean canoes during the 15th century AD. It is difficult to assess to what extent Caribbean canoes from this period were comparable to their counterparts 5000 years earlier. Similar to canoes, only limited archaeological evidence exists concerning paddles. McKusick provides a basic description of Caribbean paddles:

"Their paddles have a handle like a spade, with a small crosspiece of wood across the top. This is held with one hand while the other hand grasps the paddle near the blade, the latter being 2.5 feet long. They paddle very differently than we row for they face the bow, pushing the water behind to drive the pirogue ahead".

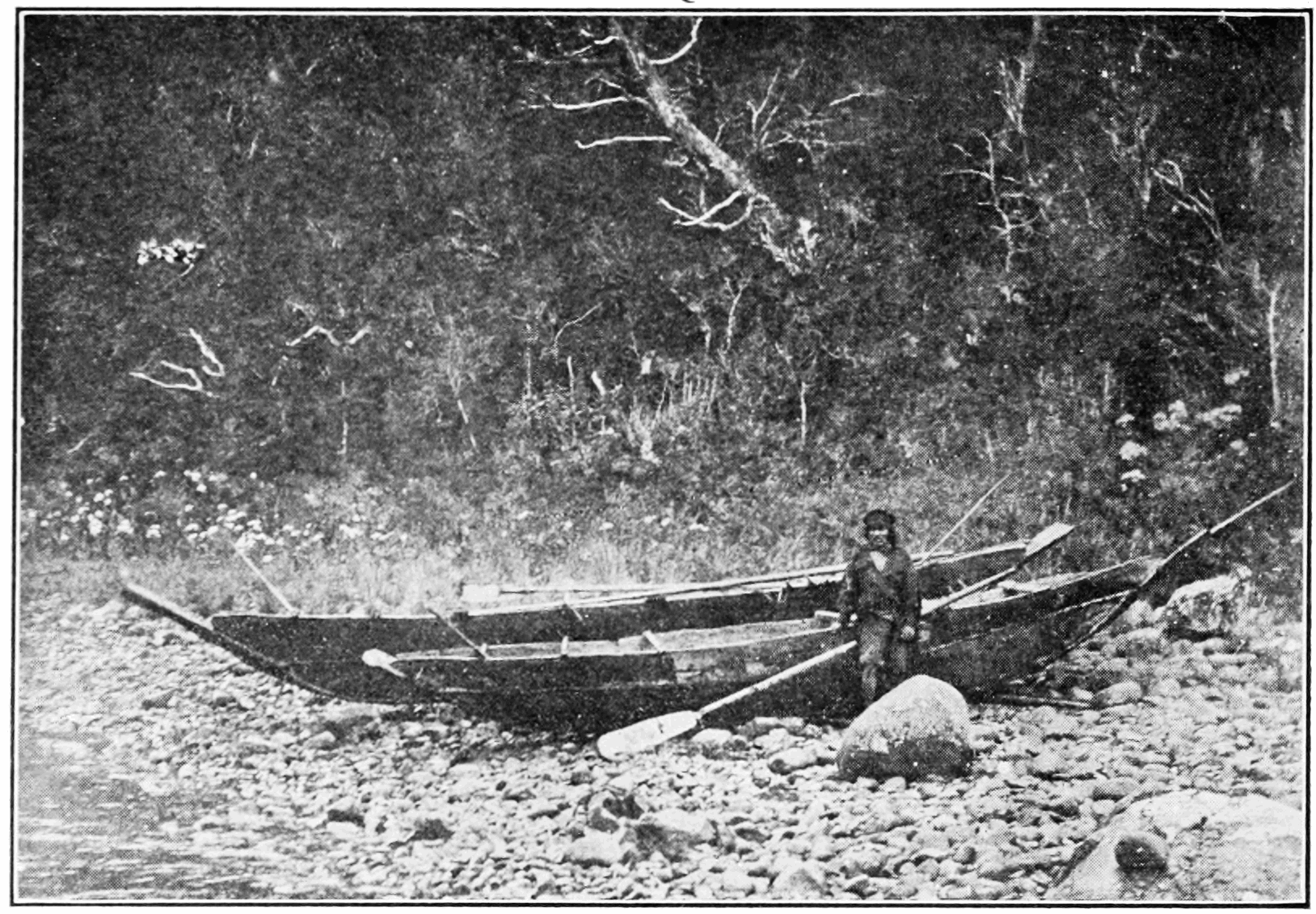
An early 20th century canoe from South America. Although not identical to Pre-Columbian Caribbean canoes they will have shared similarities.

Due to the small number of recovered precolonial Caribbean paddles it cannot be stated with certainty how they were used. However, a repeated use of different paddles has been observed amongst Pacific Islanders, which may have been similar in the Caribbean. In general, paddles used in still water or less turbid rivers were typically shorter, while paddles used in open water were of a sharp bladed pattern, allowing rapid strokes to achieve maximum speed.

These is still much dispute regarding the use of sails in Caribbean canoes. Some archaeologists doubt that oceanic transportation would have been possible without the use of sails as winds and currents would have carried the canoes off course. However, no evidence of a sail or a Caribbean canoe that could have made use of a sail has been found. Furthermore, no historical sources mention Caribbean canoes with sails. One possibility could be that canoes with sails were initially used in the Caribbean but later abandoned before European contact. This, however, seems unlikely, as long-distance trade continued in the Caribbean even after the European colonisation of the islands. Hence, it is likely that early Caribbean colonists made use of canoes without sails.
