= Batey (game) =

Taíno plaza around which the Caribbean Taino built their settlements

Batéy was the name given to a special plaza around which Indigenous Antilleans, including the Taínos and Ciguayos, built their settlements. It was usually a rectangular area surrounded by stones with carved symbols (petroglyphs).

The batey was the area in which batey events (e.g. ceremonies, the ball game, etc.) took place. The batey ceremony (also known as batu) can be viewed from some historical accounts as more of a judicial contest rather than a game. Because historical accounts of the game and court space come from (mostly Spanish) European explorers, the true nature, history, and function of the batey is still contested. Neighboring tribes may have used batey matches to resolve differences without warfare.

== Distribution ==
Bateys are found in Turks, Caicos, St. Croix, Dominican Republic, The Bahamas, eastern Cuba, Haiti, and "the largest number of known ball courts are to be found in Puerto Rico and the U.S. Virgin Islands".

== Batey origins ==
There is no consensus as to whether the batey ball game in the Caribbean was independently developed in different regions of the New World or whether it diffused from one or more locations. The large centrally located cemeteries in Saladoid villages served as plazas like those seen in the lowland communities of South America.

The ceremonial and religious significance of the later-developed ball game appears to indicate a connection with the Mesoamerican ball-game, and it has been argued that the batey ball-game of the Caribbean is a simplified version of the Maya pok ta pok, specified to the culture and religion of the Taíno. It is possible that the route of diffusion of the game of pok ta pok and other elements of Mayan culture was not a direct one from the Yucatan to the Caribbean, but an indirect one by way of South America, because the Otomacos in South America also played a similar game.

Ethnographer Ralph Beals reported in the early 1930s that the Acaxee tribe from western Mexico played a ball game called "vatey [or] batey" on "a small plaza, very flat, with walls at the sides".

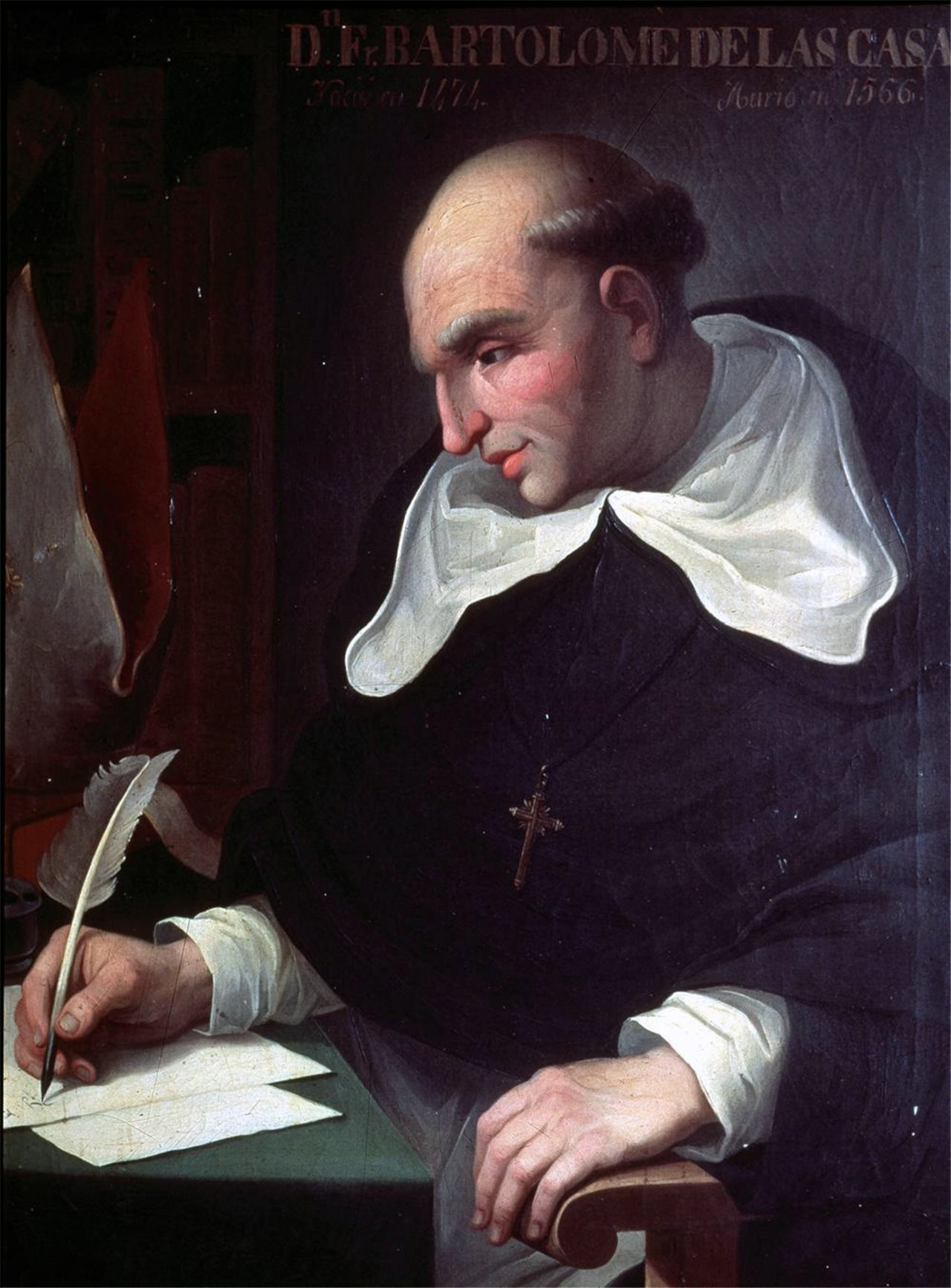
Bartolomé de las Casas

The majority of the documented information about the ball game specific to the Caribbean islands comes from the historic accounts of Gonzalo Fernández de Oviedo y Valdés and Bartolomé de las Casas (see picture to the right). The native name for the ball court and game was batey. Oviedo's description of the balls is reminiscent of rubber or some kind of resin with rubber-like qualities; in all sources, some kind of reference is made to the unfamiliar bounciness of the balls.

The game was played by two teams, each team consisting anywhere from ten to thirty players. Normally, the teams were composed of only men, but occasionally women played the game as well. Oviedo noted that sometimes men and women would play on mixed teams, men and women against each other, and the married women against unwed female virgins. Married women wore a shawl wrapped around their bodies while the men and virgin women went bare. Archaeologists have noted a connection between the ball courts and the stone “elbow” and “neck” collars prominent in Puerto Rico around the ball court sites. The function of these collars is not evident or explicitly detailed in historic accounts. Caribbean stone collars and the Mexican stone yokes that were worn by Mesoamerican ball game players as ceremonial belts are similar.

Faltas (errors or faults) were made when the ball came to a halt on the ground or if it had been thrown out of bounds (outside the stone boundary markers). The ball could only be struck from the shoulder, the elbow, the head, the hips, the buttock, or the knees and never with the hands. Las Casas noted that when women played the game they did not use their hips or shoulders, but their knees. Points were earned when the ball failed to be returned from a non-faulted play (similar to the earning of points in today's volleyball). Play continued until the number of predetermined points was earned by a side. Often, players and chiefs made bets or wagers on the possible outcome of a game. These wagers were paid after a game was concluded.

== Ball court petroglyphs ==
Petroglyph of a bird at the batey complex in Caguana

Petroglyphs have been found on river boulders, walls of caves and rock shelters, and on upright stone slabs outlining ball court plazas. Unfortunately, many of these artifacts have been stolen by collectors or looters. There are two main types of petroglyphs: 1) geometric designs and 2) images representing human or animal forms (especially the “swaddled infant”). Rouse has described the petroglyphs as “human-like bodies and heads, of faces, and of geometric designs, several of which suggest the sun and the moon”.

The most common geometric designs are concentric circles, spirals and double spirals (clockwise and counterclockwise with three to five rings), single and double hooks, two triangles set together resembling butterfly wings, horseshoe-like symbols, and series of pits loosely grouped together. There are also multi-rayed solar emblems, lizards, iguanas, birds, animistic heads with rays emanating from the neck, mask-like “faces,” and a variety of other heads or faces (human and animal ranging from simple circles with three pits or rings for the eyes and mouth to stylized loops resembling petals or feathers). These petroglyphs can be directly compared in design and style with the petroglyphs seen in Northwest Brazil and Venezuela.

The other most common image in the petroglyphs are grinning or grimacing, large eared, primarily zoomorphic “swaddled infants.” Although they appear to us as "swaddled infants", they actually represent ancestors who were wrapped in hammocks upon death. The images have limbless, rounded bodies that are sack-like at the bottom. Their ears are often exaggeratedly large and are presented in varying positions and shapes.

In Puerto Rico, the “infant” type and the geometric/curvilinear type tend to occupy separate village sites. Current archaeological data is inconclusive as to whether the designs were from two different time periods (the spiral groups are mostly in the mountainous interior where the infant type is much rarer) or if the designs represent a difference in religious symbolism.

== See also ==
- Callejones Site
