= Igneri =

Indigenous Arawak people of the southern Lesser Antilles in the Caribbean

Eyeri

Regions with significant populations
- Southern Lesser Antilles

Languages
- Igneri language (Island Carib)

Related ethnic groups
- Taíno, Island Caribs

The Igneri were an Indigenous Arawakan-speaking people of the southern Lesser Antilles in the Caribbean. Historically, it was thought that the Igneri were conquered and displaced by the Island Caribs (Kalinago) in an invasion some time before European contact. However, linguistic and archaeological studies in the 20th century have led scholars to different theories as to what happened to of the Igneri. The Igneri spoke an Arawakan language which transitioned into the Kalinago language.

== History ==
The Caribbean was populated in various waves, several of which produced varying and often successive archaeological cultures. It is not clear which sites and cultures may be related to the Igneri. Archaeologist Irving Rouse associated them with the Suazoid culture, which emerged around AD 1000 in the Lesser Antilles as a continuation of the earlier Saladoid culture. The Suazoid culture lasted until around 1450, which may reflect the transition from Igneri to Kalinago culture in the islands.

== Kalinago connections ==
The Igneri are known from the traditions of the Island Caribs or Kalinago, who lived in the Lesser Antilles at the time of European contact. According to these traditions, the Igneri were the original inhabitants of the islands, while the Caribs were invaders originating in South America (home to the mainland Caribs or Kalina). By these accounts, the Caribs conquered and displaced the Igneri. As this tradition was widespread and internally consistent, it was accepted as historical by Europeans. An invasion would explain cultural differences between the Island Caribs and their Arawakan-speaking neighbors in the Greater Antilles, the Taíno, as well as some peculiarities of Carib culture, in particular the fact that male and female Caribs were noted as speaking different languages from at least the 17th century. This was explained as an effect of the invasion: according to this interpretation, incoming Carib men took captured Arawak women as wives, and thus the women spoke an Arawakan tongue while the men presumably spoke Carib.

However, linguistic analysis in the 20th century determined that the main Island Carib language was spoken by both sexes, and was Arawakan, not Cariban. As such, scholars have adopted different theories to explain the transition from Igneri to Island Carib in the Antilles. Irving Rouse proposed that a relatively small scale Carib force conquered but did not displace the Igneri, and the invaders eventually took on the Igneri language while still maintaining their identity as Caribs. Other scholars such as Sued Badillo doubt there was an invasion at all, proposing that the Igneri adopted the "Carib" identity over time due to their close economic and political relations with the rising mainland Carib polity. Both theories accept that the historical Island Carib language developed from the existing tongue of the islands, and thus it is also known as Igneri.

The idea that Island Carib men and women spoke different languages arises from the fact that by at least the early 17th century, Carib men spoke a Cariban-based pidgin language in addition to the usual Arawakan language used by both sexes. This was similar to pidgins used by mainland Caribs when communicating with their Arawak neighbors. Berend J. Hoff and Douglas Taylor hypothesized that it dated to the time of the Carib expansion through the islands, and that males maintained it to emphasize their origins on the mainland. Alternately, if there was no Carib invasion, the pidgin may have been a later development acquired through mainland contacts.
