= Saladoid =

Pre-Columbian indigenous culture of territory in present-day Venezuela

The Saladoid culture is a pre-Columbian Indigenous culture of territory in present-day Venezuela and the Caribbean that flourished from 500 BCE to 545 CE. Concentrated along the lowlands of the Orinoco River, the people migrated by sea to the Lesser Antilles, and then to Puerto Rico.

== Name ==
This cultural classification comes from adding the suffix "oid" to the sites where these unique pottery styles were first recognised; thus the name Saladoid, from name of the modern settlement of Saladero, is used by archaeologists to identify the peoples of the early ceramic age.

== Chronology ==
The Saladoid period includes four subcultures, defined by ceramic styles.

- Hacienda Grande culture (250 BCE–300 CE)
- Cuevas culture (400–600 CE)
- Prosperity culture (1–300 CE)
- Coral Bay-Longford culture (350–550 CE)

== Migrations ==
This culture is thought to have originated at the lower Orinoco River near the modern settlements of Saladero and Barrancas in Venezuela. Seafaring people from the lowland region of the Orinoco River migrated into and established settlements in the Lesser Antilles, Puerto Rico, and Hispaniola. They displaced the pre-ceramic Ortoiroid culture. As a horticultural people, they initially occupied wetter and more fertile islands that could best support agriculture. It is believed that they spoke an Arawakan language.

Between 500 and 280 BCE, they migrated to the Lesser Antilles and Puerto Rico, eventually making up a large portion of what was to become a single Caribbean culture. In Puerto Rico, evidence of their historic settlements is found mainly in the western part of the island. In Sint Eustatius broken pottery, bone, coral, stone, shell tools, and remains of malocas were found at the Golden Rock archaeological site.

== Culture ==
Saladoid people are characterized by agriculture, ceramic production, and sedentary settlements. Their unique and highly decorated pottery has enabled archaeologists to recognize their sites and to determine their places of origin. Saladoid ceramics include zoomorphic effigy vessels, incense burners, platters, trays, jars, bowls with strap handles, and bell-shaped containers. The red pottery was painted with white, orange, and black slips.

Distinctive Saladoid artifacts are stone pendants shaped like raptors from South America. These were made from a range of exotic materials, including such as carnelian, turquoise, lapis lazuli, amethyst, crystal quartz, jasper-chalcedony, and fossilized wood. These were traded through the Great and Lesser Antilles and the South American mainland until 600 CE.

== Decline ==
The Saladoide were displaced by the Barrancoid people in the West Indies. In many regions, they disappeared by approximately 700 CE.
