= 1926 Nassau hurricane =

Category 4 Atlantic hurricane

Hurricane One 1926 Nassau hurricane
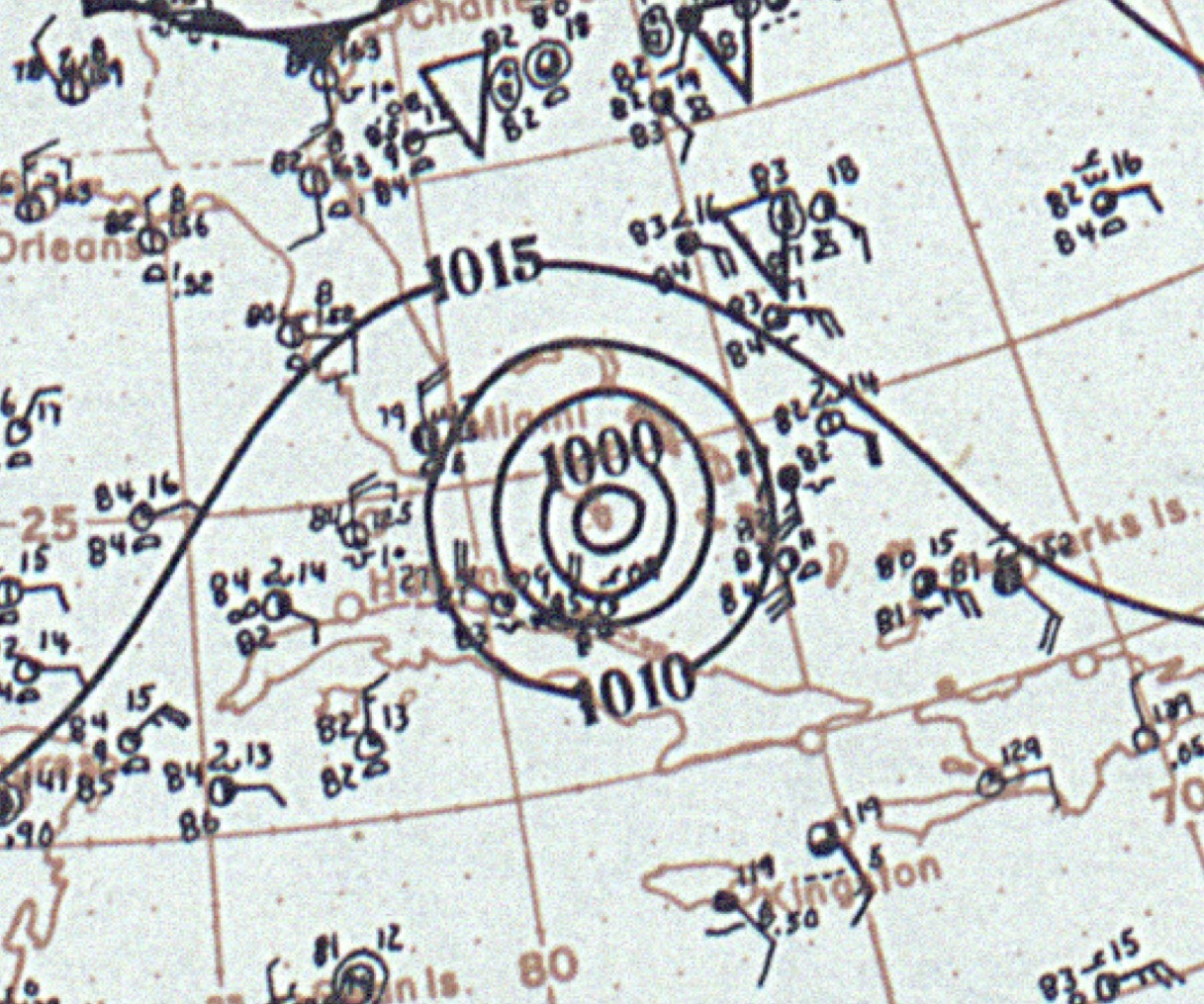
- Surface weather analysis of the hurricane over the Bahamas on July 26

Meteorological history
- Formed: July 22, 1926
- Extratropical: July 31, 1926
- Dissipated: August 2, 1926

Category 4 major hurricane
- 1-minute sustained (SSHWS/NWS)
- Highest winds: 140 mph (220 km/h)
- Lowest pressure: ≤955 mbar (hPa); ≤28.20 inHg (lowest directly measured)

Overall effects
- Fatalities: 454–64+ direct (+2 indirect) (estimates of up to 598)
- Damage: $19.1 million (1926 USD) ($346 million in 2025 USD)
- Areas affected: Leeward Islands; Puerto Rico; Dominican Republic; Turks and Caicos Islands; British Bahamas; Florida; Georgia
- IBTrACS /
- Part of the 1926 Atlantic hurricane season

The Great Nassau hurricane, also called the second San Liborio hurricane, (Note: Tropical cyclones in the Atlantic basin were not formally named prior to World War II. Storms such as this one were denoted by their attributes, including coincidence with Catholic saints' feasts. A deadly hurricane in 1866 is separately known by the moniker Great Nassau.) was a powerful Atlantic hurricane that caused catastrophic damage and tremendous casualties in the Lucayan Archipelago, particularly in and near the Bahamian capital Nassau, as well as additional fatalities and damages from the Greater Antilles to the Southeastern United States. The first named storm and hurricane of the busy 1926 Atlantic hurricane season, it developed a short distance east of the Lesser Antilles on July 22, becoming a hurricane the following day. On July 24 it struck southwestern Puerto Rico as a moderate hurricane, then weakened as it traced the northeastern coast of Hispaniola. As it neared the Turks and Caicos Islands, on July 25, it began to re-intensify, and when it reached the Bahamas a day later, it was a potent hurricane with winds of 140 mph (220 km/h), equal to Category 4 on the present-day Saffir–Simpson scale, and the strongest observed in the month of July until 2005. After passing over or near Nassau, the cyclone began to lose intensity, and on July 28 impacted the First Coast of Florida with winds of 105 mph (165 km/h). Once inland, the storm quickly degenerated over the Southeastern United States, and became extratropical on July 31; it dissipated near the Great Lakes region a couple of days later.

The hurricane was at its deadliest and most destructive in the Caribbean and Bahamas, claiming as many as 455 lives there, though some estimates of the dead were higher. Heavy rainfall in Puerto Rico led to flash flooding that exacted a toll of 25 lives and $5 million in losses. Similar phenomena, along with shipwrecks, in the Dominican Republic killed 162 people and induced a loss of $3 million. The worst to impact New Providence and the city of Nassau since 1866, the cyclone ravaged the Bahaman archipelago, destroying roughly 20% of the sponging fleet there, flattening entire communities on many of the islands, and causing as many as 400 fatalities. The impacts were so severe that many Bahamians were temporarily forced to migrate to the United States. Damage from the Miami and Havana–Bermuda hurricanes subsequently compounded recovery, adding over a hundred additional casualties. In the United States, particularly Florida, the storm caused comparatively modest damage, mainly to coastal structures, though heavy rainfall and tornadoes also attended the storm. 10 deaths were reported in the state of Florida, though high tides and prolific rains extended farther north, along the Southeastern coastline. In all, the storm killed at least 464 people—unofficially up to 598—and inflicted at least $19.1 million in damages.

== Meteorological history ==
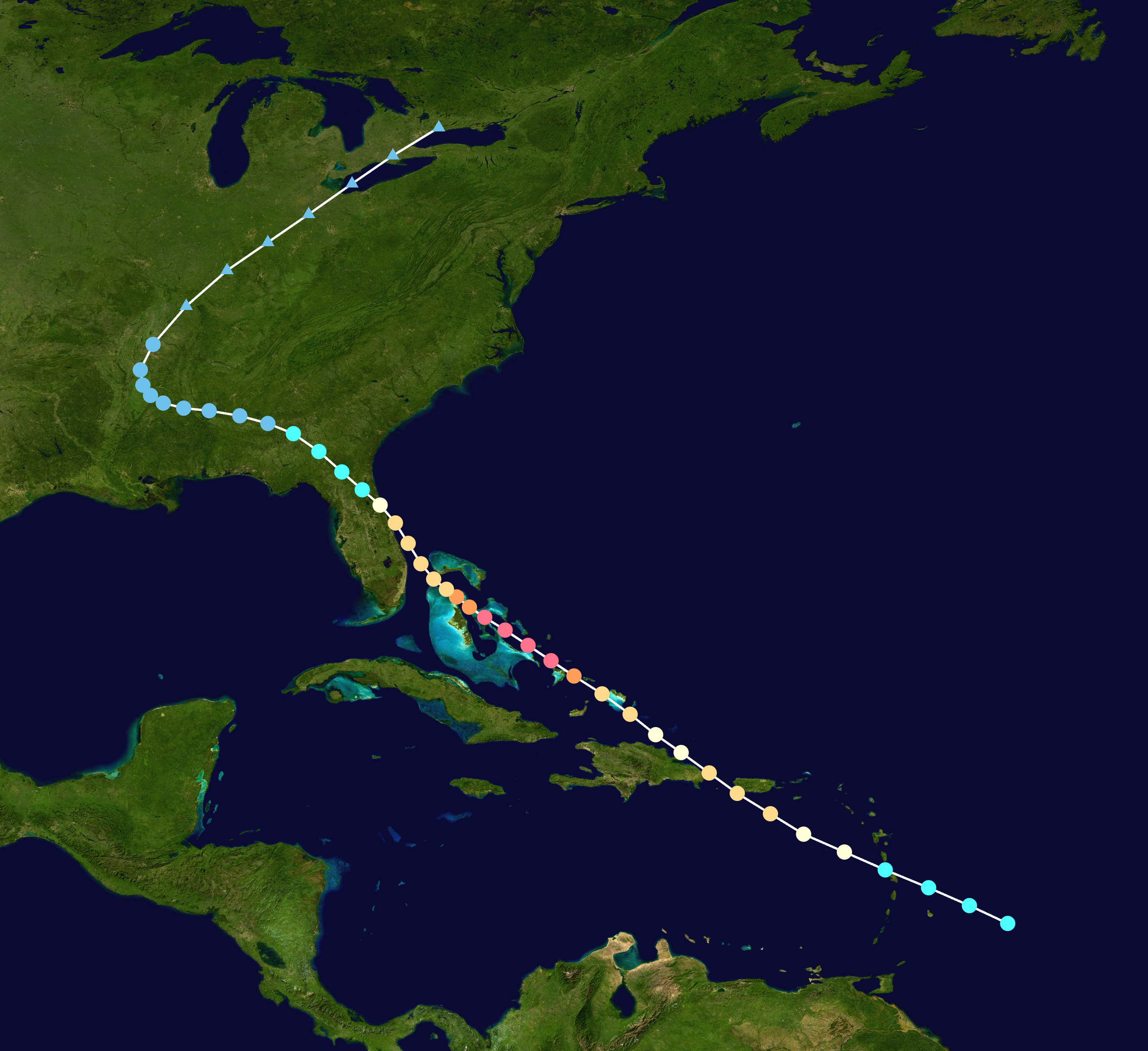
Map plotting the storm's track and intensity, according to the Saffir–Simpson scale Map key Saffir–Simpson scale Tropical depression (≤38 mph, ≤62 km/h) Tropical storm (39–73 mph, 63–118 km/h) Category 1 (74–95 mph, 119–153 km/h) Category 2 (96–110 mph, 154–177 km/h) Category 3 (111–129 mph, 178–208 km/h) Category 4 (130–156 mph, 209–251 km/h) Category 5 (≥157 mph, ≥252 km/h) Unknown Storm type Tropical cyclone Subtropical cyclone Extratropical cyclone, remnant low, tropical disturbance, or monsoon depression

At 06:00 UTC on July 22, the Atlantic hurricane database (HURDAT) initialized a weak tropical storm, with maximum sustained winds of 40 mph (65 km/h), 200 miles (320 kilometres) east of Barbados, an outpost of the Windward Islands. Operationally, the cyclone was first noted 190 mi (305 km) farther northwest, near 14.5°N 58.7°W, on the same date. Quickly strengthening, the cyclone headed generally west-northwestward, approaching and crossing the northern tip of the island of Martinique. Entering the eastern Caribbean Sea early on July 23, it became a minimal hurricane six hours later, and gradually intensified to its first peak of 105 mph (165 km/h) by 18:00 UTC. As it did so, the cyclone began turning northwestward, toward coastal southwestern Puerto Rico, and made landfall over present-day Cabo Rojo National Wildlife Refuge early on July 24. At the time, it was equivalent to a Category 2 hurricane.

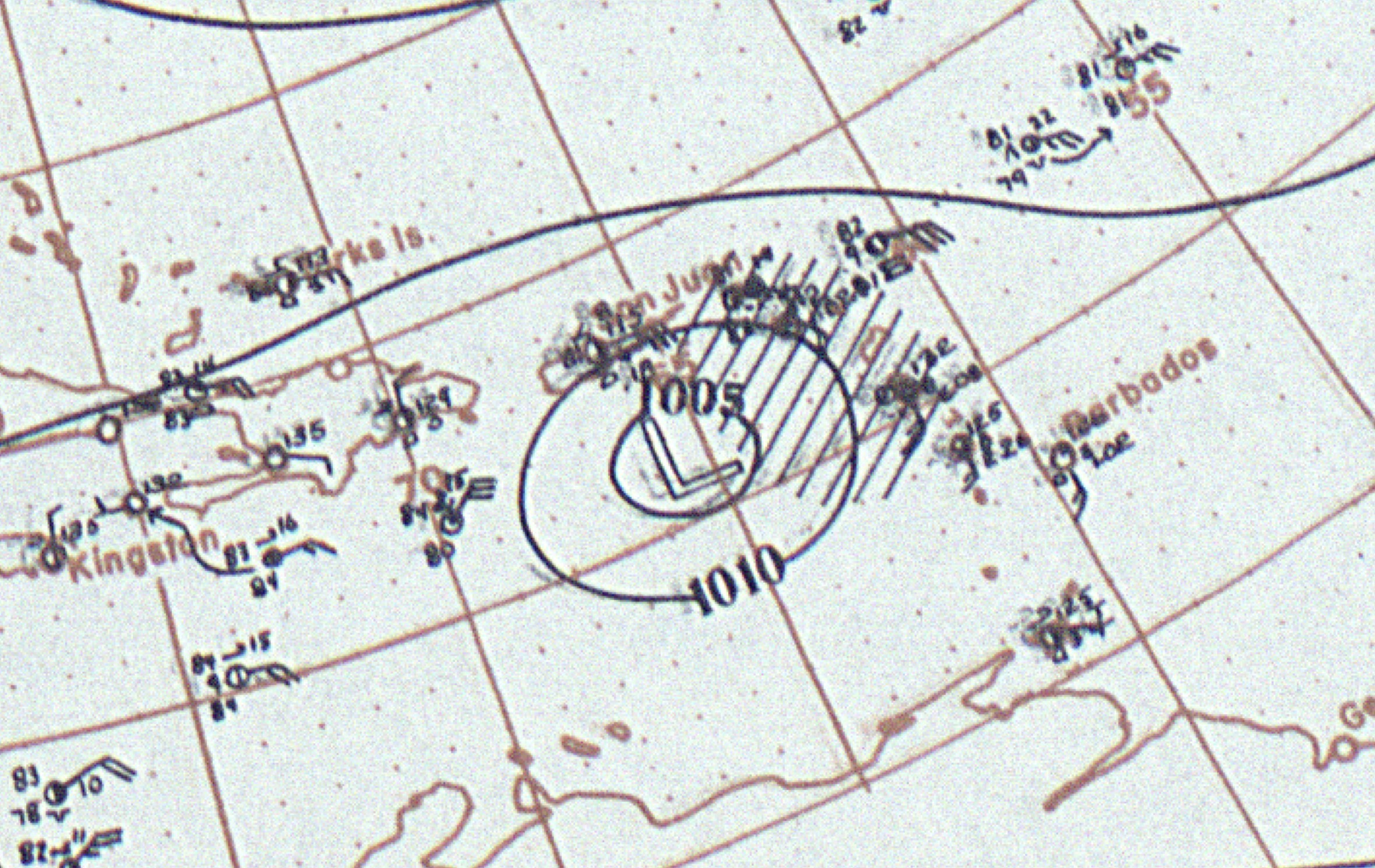
Weather map of the hurricane approaching Puerto Rico and the Dominican Republic on July 23

Over the next day, the cyclone crossed the Mona Passage and skirted the coastal northeastern Dominican Republic; in the meantime its winds decreased to 85 mph (140 km/h) due to interaction with Hispaniola. Early on July 25, however, a period of rapid deepening commenced: within 18 hours the cyclone successively attained winds of 111 mph (178 km/h) or more—equivalent to a major hurricane on the modern-day Saffir–Simpson scale—and then 130 mph (215 km/h), making it a Category 4 storm. At 00:00 UTC on July 26, the cyclone reached its estimated peak of 140 mph (220 km/h), with central pressure of about 938 mb (27.7 inHg); this made it the strongest Atlantic hurricane on record in the month of July until Hurricanes Dennis and Emily in 2005. (Note: The estimated central pressure was derived from pressure–wind relationships. Due to uncertainty, the value was not entered into HURDAT by the Atlantic hurricane reanalysis project.)

During its peak the cyclone tore through the Bahamas as a potent hurricane, though few meteorological observations were available near the storm's eye. Largely maintaining its force, the storm passed near or over the Bahamian capital Nassau. After passing New Providence, the cyclone began to gradually weaken and its forward speed decreased. As it did so, the western flank of the Azores High—a seasonal ridge of high atmospheric pressure—eroded, allowing a northward shift. By 06:00 UTC on July 27 the cyclone lost major-hurricane status and turned north-northwestward, nearing coastal eastern Florida. Sideswiping the Indian River, the storm continued to gradually weaken, and made landfall near New Smyrna at 10:00 UTC on July 28. (Note: Before reanalysis in 2010, landfall was assessed farther south, near present-day Cocoa Beach.) At the time, the storm featured a smaller-than-average eye size and a central pressure near 967 mb (28.6 inHg), both of which suggested winds of 105 mph (165 km/h).

After landfall, the storm quickly weakened and resumed a northwestward course. Eight hours after moving inland, it shed hurricane status. A day later, after crossing Georgia, the cyclone degenerated into a tropical depression and headed westward over Alabama. Late on July 30, the depression began curving northward over Mississippi, and spent nearly three additional days heading northeastward. The system traversed the Mississippi and Ohio valleys before encountering the Great Lakes region. It became extratropical early on August 1 and dissipated over southern Ontario a day and a half later.

== Preparations ==
On July 23 the United States Weather Bureau cautioned mariners in the eastern Caribbean, and later that day issued hurricane warnings for vessels at sea, southeast of Puerto Rico. On July 24 the agency apprised Caribbean-bound ships of 50-to-64-mile-per-hour (80 to 103 km/h) winds, notifying areas south of 25°N. At 02:00 UTC on July 25 the Weather Bureau issued a tropical storm warning from Jupiter Inlet to Key West, Florida; this was raised to a hurricane warning the next day. Residents of Nassau began securing their properties, but warnings did not reach Family Islanders—residents of the Out Islands, the majority of the Bahaman archipelago—or seafarers. As the hurricane neared South Florida, the Miami-area crew of the 75-foot-long (23 m) cruising yacht Cinnabar sought shelter in the Bimini Islands during an excursion there. Vessels off Florida remained on standby, while others idled in port. On July 27 the Weather Bureau extended the hurricane warning north to Jacksonville, Florida, and to Charleston, South Carolina, a day later. Most residents of the Sea Islands evacuated inland, including hundreds from St. Simons, Georgia. Watercraft headed for safety. Brunswick launched flares to alert mariners.

== Impact ==
Impacts by region
Region	Deaths	Injuries	Locale	Deaths	Injuries	Damages	Source
Caribbean and Bahamas	445–55+	?	Bahamas	258–68+	Unknown	$8,000,000	
Caribbean and Bahamas	445–55+	?	Dominican Republic	162	Unknown	$3,000,000	
Caribbean and Bahamas	445–55+	?	Puerto Rico	25	Unknown	$5,000,000	
United States	11	?	Florida	10	Unknown	$3,051,000	
United States	11	?	Georgia	1	Unknown	Unknown	
Total				456–66+	?	$19,051,000	

=== Eastern Caribbean Sea ===
The schooner Schwabbe grounded on Saint Kitts, along with several lighters, a few of which were ripped apart. Communication lines on the island were slightly damaged. In Puerto Rico, where the storm was dubbed the second San Liborio hurricane, (Note: The first storm to receive this name occurred in 1813.) the Weather Bureau office in San Juan measured peak winds of 66 mph (106 km/h), (Note: Note that wind tunnel research beginning in the 1920s found that the era's four-cup anemometers exhibited a high bias.) rainfall of 5.9 in (150 mm), and a minimum atmospheric pressure of 29.62 inHg (1,003 mb). Rainfall from the storm in Puerto Rico peaked at 14.41 in (366 mm), in Río Grande. All the rivers in the south of Puerto Rico, including the Arecibo, Guacio, Loíza, Bayamón, La Plata, Yauco, Peñuelas, and Manatí, overflowed their banks.

Floods wrecked many small homes. The coffee crop received a 30% loss. Losses in Puerto Rico totaled $5 million, and 25 fatalities were recorded. A study concluded that, due to the level of wind damage (equal to F2 on the modern Fujita scale), estimated wind gusts peaked at 113–157 mph (182–253 km/h) in Puerto Rico, suggesting Category 2 sustained winds there. In the Dominican Republic the storm inflicted $3 million in losses, mainly due to flash flooding, as heavy rains caused watercourses to overtop their banks. Bridges were swept away, warehouses swamped, and ships damaged. At Santo Domingo rescuers located at least 59 dead by July 29. At Macoris Harbor violent seas sank several barges and a tugboat. A few boats were lost at sea with 100 aboard. Winds tore off the roof of the custom house as well. Three schooners capsized off Saona Island, near southeastern Hispaniola, and other vessels stranded elsewhere. Additionally, three crew members aboard the Peceful were swept overboard and drowned.

=== The Bahamas ===
As of August 1, reports suggested that the storm killed more than 150 people in the Bahamas, while 400 others in the crown colony were unaccounted for, 350 of whom were believed to have been lost at sea. Final estimates of the death toll in the Bahamas ranged as high as 400, though official counts ranged from 258 to 68. Nearly 100 vessels in the Bahamas were wrecked at sea, including 80 of the 400 vessels in the Bahamian sponge fleet, along with 60 watercraft in Nassau Harbour. In all the storm destroyed three-fourths of all shipping in the islands. The cumulative effects of this storm, the Miami hurricane, and the Havana–Bermuda hurricane created a food shortage and led to out-migration of sponge fishermen to Tarpon Springs, Florida. (Note: This and the other two storms hobbled the sponge industry, then a mainstay of the Bahamian economy.) Many other Bahamians either flocked to Nassau seeking work or sought temporary refuge with relatives in Florida. The storms of 1926 proved deadlier than all other Bahamian cyclones put together from 1927 to 2008.

==== Out Islands ====
On the Abaco Islands the cyclone destroyed all seawalls and wharves, homes in reach of which were washed out as well. Most settlements were inundated with 4 1/2 ft (1.4 m) or more of seawater, and main thoroughfares were blocked for many days by fallen trees. Fruit crops such as mangos, oranges, sapodillas, pears, and grapefruit incurred major damage. At Cherokee Sound seven men were killed on land, in addition to several other fatalities at sea. One death and losses in excess of £2,000 were reported from Marsh Harbour, where all trees, a schoolhouse, three churches, and numerous dwellings were downed. The majority of three-masted schooners in the vicinity were ruined. Three fishing smacks from Cherokee Sound were destroyed as well, resulting in five drownings. A fourth schooner also wrecked on the western part of Great Abaco. The storm also destroyed many homes at Hope Town.

On Eleuthera, the storm felled coconut and other fruit crops; strong winds and high tides leveled 240 dwellings, 14 churches, and two schools. Additionally, 56 dwellings and 16 boats were severely damaged. On the island most roads were unusable, and the main causeways were annihilated; 2 to 4 ft (0.61 to 1.22 m) of water covered the land. Half the pineapple crop received damage, other staples being total losses. 831 people islandwide lost their homes. On Harbour Island the cyclone severely damaged or destroyed 47 dwellings. A church, a pair of schools, and four schooners were total losses as well. A prison and police office were partly wrecked, and a dozen schooners were severely damaged. Between the Current and Spanish Wells the storm collectively destroyed 10 churches. 10 drownings took place at James Cistern. A home collapsed, injuring a few people. The schooner Imperial broke up at Rock Sound with seven aboard, all of whom drowned. A total of nine homes were destroyed in the villages Wemyss Bight, Tarpum Bay, and Green Castle. The storm toppled a lighthouse at Powell Point and knocked down small homes at Governor's Harbour. A sloop went down with 20 aboard off Cat Island, where at least 74 drownings occurred—more than at any other site. The vessel Mountain King also foundered, losing 25 out of 26 aboard. On Cat Island a society hall, a pair of churches, and 27 homes were destroyed. At Arthur's Town the storm damaged a dozen homes and blew down nine others. On San Salvador the storm felled a number of trees and more than nine churches. The mail boat The Brontes was torn apart, and all 30 aboard were killed.

On Acklins the hurricane destroyed more than 427 houses, leaving most of the population homeless. Many residents perished in the storm surge that enveloped the island, and the survivors were reportedly famished. At Snug Corner 91 out of 92 houses were destroyed. At Hard Hill the storm claimed 90 more homes. At Spring Point the storm leveled a schoolhouse, a church, and 53 homes. 10 small boats were torn apart as well. In the Thompson settlement the storm wrecked three homes. At Relief half a dozen people drowned, where 25 homes were destroyed. A total of 31 homes were destroyed at Jew Fish and Pine Field. The storm destroyed 13 more at Pastell's and 22 at Chester's; at the latter place rising seawater forced nine families to flee to a hilltop, including that of four-year-old Clifford Darling, a future Governor-General of the Bahamas, who was carried to safety in a sack and retrospectively called the storm the "most powerful and frightening" he encountered. One person died at Delectable, where 43 structures were destroyed. 48 homes were wrecked at Pompey Bay, along with many small boats. At Binnacle Hill and Aston Key the storm destroyed 26 homes.

Palm trees uprooted in Bimini after the hurricane

On Crooked Island the cyclone destroyed 153 homes, as well as a church and 39 other structures. At Rum Cay it dismantled 11 homes and a few churches. The storm dislocated the salt industry, which employed most locals. It flooded the salt ponds, destroying 130,000 imp bsh (1,000,000 imp gal) of salt. 317 coconut palms on the cay were blown over as well. 444 chickens and sheep were killed, and a human death was reported. On Long Cay the storm destroyed another 15 homes and damaged many others. All of Mayaguana was badly hit, with some loss of life. A public school was leveled and 50,000 imp bsh (400,000 imp gal) of salt were lost at Ragged Island. On Long Island the cyclone generated an estimated surge of 4.88 ft (1.49 m), based on SLOSH estimates; this was the highest modelled on record there. The southern side of the island was most severely impacted, with hardly a home left intact. On the island the storm wrecked a schoolhouse, four churches, five shops, 23 watercraft, and 230 dwellings, including 25 houses at Clarence Town. Several public buildings in Clarence Town were damaged to some degree. The storm also leveled a lighthouse each at Simms and North End, respectively; a bridge at the former was badly damaged. During the storm 132 persons sheltered and were forced to stay in place for weeks on end due to the destruction of their homes.

Damaged hotel grounds on Bimini after the storm

On Exuma the hurricane destroyed 90% of the buildings, including 500 houses, and left more than 1,000 denizens homeless. The storm partly wrecked 300 other houses as well. At George Town the storm destroyed a rectory and six churches, along with more than half of the homes in the settlement. The vessel Sarah Jane sank with her crew of six. An additional drowning occurred as a man attempted to reach shore from another vessel. On Farmer's Cay the storm destroyed many roads, a bridge, all the fruit trees, and all crops, including the entire corn crop. Dead cattle, including sheep, littered the island as well. 11 people drowned aboard the Celeste, but three lived. On Bimini, the hurricane razed a lighthouse, a pair of churches, a hotel, six homes, and a wireless telegraph station; strong winds tore roofs off several churches and other buildings. The crew of the Cinnabar measured a minimum barometric pressure of 28.20 inHg (955 mb) during the storm. Winds on Bimini peaked at hurricane force around 04:00 UTC on July 27 while shifting 180°. The storm also wrecked most of the homes on the Berry Islands.

Damage to a church in Bimini after the storm

On Andros the storm annihilated most bridges and dwellings, along with 95% of the coconut palms and most of the 1,500-pound (680 kg) sisal crop. Water engulfed all but the highest peaks on the island, which from the air looked to be "dotted with lakes". At Staniard Creek the cyclone partly unroofed a Methodist church and completely unroofed the Social Union Society Hall. In the settlement the storm also wrecked the Commissioner's Office, the Good Samaritan Lodge Hall, and many other structures, including more than 25 houses. At Mastic Point the storm destroyed 89 homes, many of which were built of stone, leaving the settlement virtually unrecognizable. At Nicholls Town the hurricane destroyed or made uninhabitable 27 homes, along with the teacher's residence, the latter of which lost most of its furniture. Most streets in Nicholls Town were littered with various items, fallen coconut palms, boats, walls, and pieces of homes. Following the storm 97 homeless residents sought shelter in the public schoolroom. Damage to public property at Nicholls Town far exceeded £10,000. The storm washed away or blew down all but nine structures at Conch Sound. At Fresh Creek seawater overtopped the beach and merged with floodwaters from the creek. In the nearby settlement the storm severely damaged or destroyed 83 buildings and felled 500 coconut palms. Three drowings were reported there. The schooner Imperial wrecked off Red Bays, west of Andros, with seven members of her crew lost. Rough seas also swept away several houses at Red Bays, drowning an indeterminate number of people. Three sponging schooners were also destroyed, five of whose crew perished. Additionally, many vessels off North Andros vanished along with their large crews. At Long Bay Cays, South Andros, the hurricane sank, marooned, or destroyed many vessels. The storm also annihilated the main road in the settlement for several miles beside the sea, depositing piles of vegetation and marine debris that impeded traffic at several locations. A drainage canal dating to the previous year was breached and filled with sand as well, a 30-to-40-foot-wide (9.1 to 12.2 m) strip of shoreline having been eroded.

==== New Providence and Grand Bahama ====
Fallen palms in Nassau after the storm

Denizens of Nassau regarded the storm as the most impactful since the 1866 hurricane, in comparison with which the former was much stronger. Storminess buffeted Nassau for two days, and residents endured winds of up to 135 mph (217 km/h). Sections of Nassau were only navigable by boat, as water lay 4 1/2 ft (1.4 m) deep in streets and yards. Roy W. Miner, curator of lower invertebrates at the American Museum of Natural History, wrote that royal palms were shorn of their crowns, save but a few fronds, "like roosters after a cockfight"; he also noted that winds crumpled steel telegraph poles "as if made of tin", blew down centuries-old trees, and "reduced to kindling" frame buildings. Numerous churches received severe damage, among them masonry buildings that were stripped of their roofs or leveled.

Views of damage in Nassau after the hurricane

According to The Nassau Guardian, fierce winds flayed automobile roofs, turning them into "ribbons", and chiseled the cars' enamel; the effect on the vehicles' paint mimicked "the fire of blow lamps". The Tribune reported that all cropland was underwater and "faced complete destruction". At Adelaide Village the storm destroyed all but a single dwelling, along with the local churches, forcing their occupants to sleep underneath debris. 38 residents feasted on fallen mangos until aid came. The Fort Montagu Hotel lost most of its Spanish-style roof tiles, along with part of the roof itself, and many of its windows and glass panes were shattered as well. Floodwaters damaged the interior of the hotel, and strong winds knocked down every tree on its grounds. The Royal Victoria Hotel and Gardens incurred great damage, as did the New Colonial Hotel. "Great havoc" resulted at Salt Cay.

Damaged warehouse in Nassau after the storm

At Fox Hill and Grant's Town the cyclone destroyed most of the homes, leaving piles of wreckage in waterlogged streets. In Nassau the storm also destroyed liquor warehouses on the northern edge of Bay Street. Boats washed across Bay Street at the apex of the storm; once the winds had subsided the street was filled with water to a depth of 1 ft (0.30 m) for 1/4 mi (0.40 km). A promenade at the east of the street was compared to a "vast lake", the entrance to which was obstructed by fallen trees. 42 of the 49 watercraft in the Nassau Harbour Channel were blown ashore and wrecked. Piers and bathhouses were obliterated, along with other waterside structures. On Grand Bahama authorities concluded that winds surpassed 120 mph (195 km/h) during the hurricane. On the island the hurricane severely damaged or destroyed all boats, several docks, a bridge, and a church. A schooner, the Dauntless, sank with her crew of nine.

=== Florida ===
In its time the cyclone was the first July hurricane to be noted in eastern Florida, and was the first of two hurricanes to cross the state in 1926. The Weather Bureau concluded that winds along eastern Florida peaked at an estimated 90 mph (145 km/h). Total losses in Florida reached $3.1 million. (Note: Other estimates were pegged at $2 1/2 million.)

==== South Florida and Lake Okeechobee ====
Sand piles covering a road after the storm in Miami Beach

South of Miami the cyclone damaged citrus groves and felled two-thirds of the ripe avocados, the latter of which incurred a loss of $100,000 as a result. In Miami gale-force winds tore down high-tension wires, trees, and signs. Winds on the coast topped out at 55 mph (89 km/h), doing "considerable" damage to property. Strong winds prostrated at least 20 telephone poles citywide. Winds also blew out windows and destroyed awnings on Miami Beach. A lineman there died of electrocution while repairing overhead wires, as did another in neighboring Broward County. Waves on North Beach destroyed a bulkhead next to Baker's Haulover Inlet.

A concession stand damaged at South Beach after the storm

An apartment complex, the Gulf Stream, on North Beach sustained several thousand dollars in losses due to wind and tide. The storm tore a mobile diving board on the property loose from its mooring and hurled it against a camber, resulting in its being damaged; the platform had been tethered to an anchor by a pair of 1-inch-thick (2.5 cm) steel cables. High tides heavily damaged bulkheads at Normandy Isles. On Indian Creek the 40-foot-long (12 m) cabin cruiser Don B. sustained $200 in damage to her superstructure. Winds also uprooted small palms on Allison Island. On Biscayne Bay the storm wrecked three houseboats, two harbor tugs, and two pleasure craft, along with a number of canoes.

Damage to a vacant home after the storm in Delray Beach

In Fort Lauderdale the storm wrecked plate glass, awnings, and other items, including 72 of the 118 light fixtures at Croissant Park. Winds citywide were reportedly stronger than in the last significant cyclone, in 1910. On the oceanfront high winds whisked away automobile roofs, and at nearby Progresso a furniture warehouse lost its roof and one of its walls, a concrete-block section. Sections of Ocean Boulevard south of Fort Lauderdale Beach were beyond repair, as a 1/4-mile-long (0.40 km) stretch of highway was undermined by the ocean, bringing the coastline 200 ft (61 m) inland. The shoreline had also migrated landward to the sidewalks on Fort Lauderdale Beach, and at least 1/2 ft (0.15 m) of sand, along with portions of a seawall and other debris, covered Ocean Drive. The New River also spilled over its banks at one location. On nearby Hollywood Beach the storm extensively damaged a local boardwalk and other oceanfront property. At Hillsboro Inlet Light the storm generated winds of 65 mph (105 km/h), the strongest observed there since at least 1911. High tides partially covered roads leading to the light station. At Pompano winds tossed a water tank off the third story of the Pinehurst Hotel and unroofed much of the building. The storm also overturned small structures citywide. Rainwater also filtered into the headquarters of the Pompano News, which lost part of its roof as well.

Beach erosion after the storm in West Palm Beach

At Delray the storm reportedly proved to be the worst in living memory. Waves up to 25 ft (7.6 m) in height swept across Ocean Boulevard, and high winds unroofed homes throughout the city. The winds also shifted garages and small structures off their foundations. At West Palm Beach the storm damaged beyond repair approximately 40 yachts and houseboats on the Lake Worth Lagoon. The storm spread sand and debris across lakefront thoroughfares such as Flagler Boulevard, which sustained washouts as well. Winds at West Palm Beach, backing from northeast to southwest, ranged from 70 to 80 mph (115 to 130 km/h), and pressures dipped to 29.02 inHg (983 mb) at 14:30 UTC on July 27. The strong winds dislodged roof tiles, roof shingles, and signage in town. Winds tipped over several hundred royal palms on Palm Beach. Between there and Lake Worth high tides formed 12-to-20-foot-deep (3.7 to 6.1 m) potholes at 20 spots in Ocean Drive.

Damage to a boardwalk at the Wofford Hotel in Miami Beach

A boatman on the Lake Worth Lagoon was fatally crushed beneath debris. At Jupiter winds reached 100 mph (160 km/h), and many vessels were either beached nearby or blown seaward. 60-mile-per-hour (97 km/h) winds lashed Lake Okeechobee, doing much damage. At Okeechobee the storm downed "stately old", weatherbeaten trees. Winds split tall oaks "like so many saplings". Gusts ripped off awnings, smashed windows, bent signs, and disabled communications. The lake overran its banks, casting fish onshore. Locals deemed the storm "the worst in many years". Roofs were torn off small homes at Pahokee, and construction camps were leveled at Mayacca. At the latter place part of an office "caved in" as well. Heavy rains fell, soaking interiors.

==== Central and North Florida ====
Between Fort Pierce and New Smyrna the storm damaged 25–30% of the grapefruit and 10% of the orange crop. Between Palm Beach and Stuart strong winds felled approximately 100 utility poles. At Stuart numerous homes and businesses shed half their shingles, though overall damage to city property was negligible. High tides and 6-to-10-foot-high (1.8 to 3.0 m) waves combined to tear apart the local seawall and the city dock. Seas mangled many wharves and tossed numerous yachts ashore. Windows, screens, awnings, and signage throughout the city were wrecked, particularly along the exposed waterfront. The right annex of the El Bit-Lor was drenched in rain as tiles were blown off at spots, latticework ripped apart, and screens destroyed, allowing fallen plaster to damage furniture below. Windows in a café were smashed, allowing 2 in (51 mm) of water inside, and a 15-foot (4.6 m) section of tile roofing was blown off the Peacock Arcade. Collapsed tiles shattered a skylight at the Dixie Pelican Hotel, and a veranda at the hotel was destroyed.

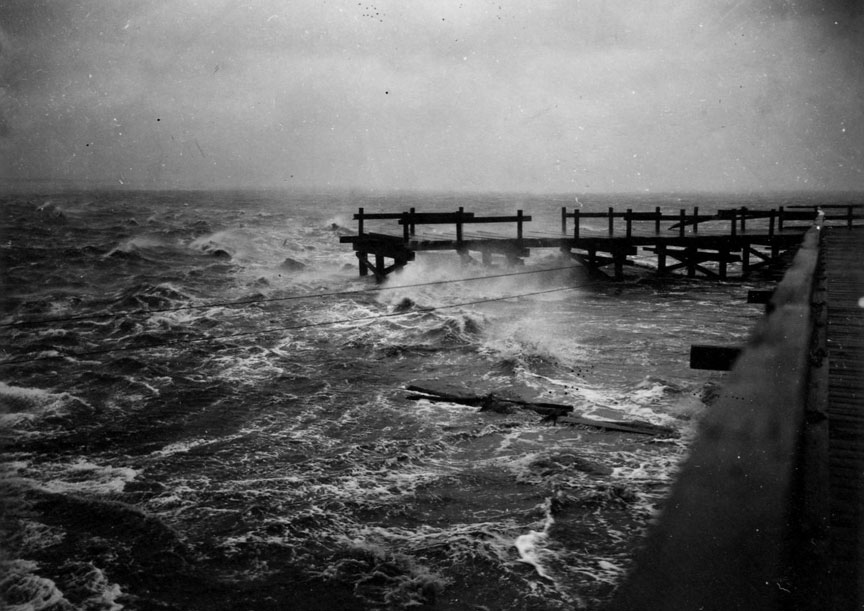
Waves crashing against a pier at the Scobie Dock during the hurricane in Titusville

At the storm's apex barometers locally ranged as low as 28.70 inHg (972 mb). At Palm City the storm tilted utility poles. Several structures there were unroofed or shifted off of their foundations. On the St. Lucie River docks, boathouses, and watercraft were irreparable or were washed out. Mostly minor damage afflicted Salerno, though losses were reportedly worse at Olympia. Inland, at Indiantown, a number of homes and the general store were nudged off their foundations, and many roofs were impacted. The storm injured 60–80% of the fruit crop in Martin County. On the barrier island opposite Fort Pierce, the storm blew over several utility poles and cabbage palms; in Fort Pierce itself several structures were unroofed or badly damaged, among them a garage, a theater, and a church. A fish packing house and a pumping station were leveled. A 700-foot-long (210 m) portion of the causeway was undermined and eroded; a smokestack was leveled; and a boiler shed at a power plant was unroofed. In Vero Beach the storm was considered the worst since 1910. Ornamental vegetation in the city was shredded. A clump of water hyacinth blocked a canal, causing water to flow around it, carry off pieces of a road, and shift a bridge. At Gifford a church and small homes in an African-American community were wrecked or otherwise moved off their foundations.

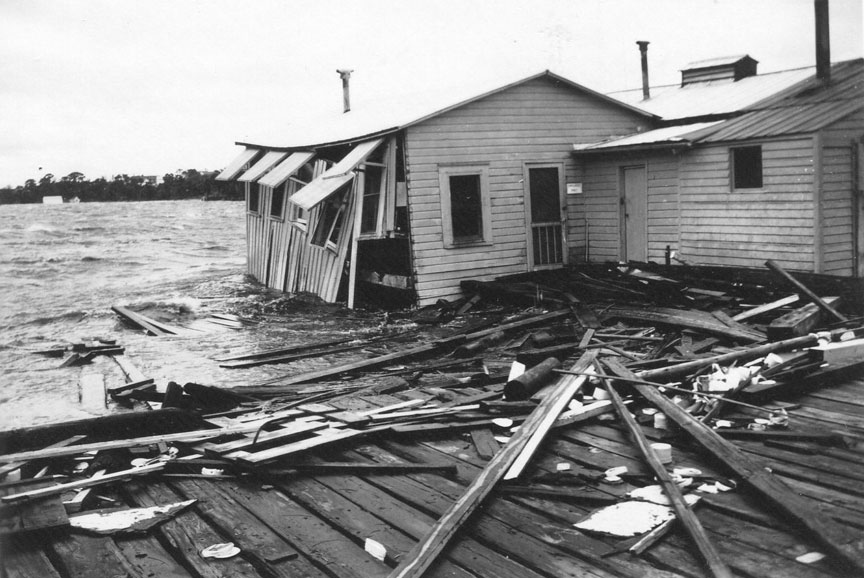
Damage to buildings at the Scobie Dock in Titusville after the hurricane

At Melbourne elderly residents considered the storm their severest on record. There the hurricane flooded several homes, and flipped small watercraft and yachts at nearby Eau Gallie. At Cocoa the eye of the hurricane arrived at 04:45 UTC on July 28, characterized by lower winds and a pressure value of 28.89 inHg (978 mb). A trio of smokestacks attached to a boiler, at a power station operated by Florida Power & Light, were toppled by high winds. At Cape Canaveral a lodge incurred extensive damage. Oceanfront awnings and screens were torn loose. At Cocoa Beach high waves left escarpments of 6 to 8 ft (1.8 to 2.4 m) and shifted the shoreline 12 ft (3.7 m) inland. A hotel and casino on the oceanfront sustained the loss of its boardwalk, its front having been undercut and left protruding seaward. The storm disconnected electricity, leaving beachfront residents powerless. Flooding affected some homes west of the Florida East Coast Railway in Brevard County. A 20-foot-wide (6.1 m) chunk of oceanfront was swept out. 50 lampposts were blown over at the southern tip of Merritt Island, where a cooperative weather observatory sampled a minimum atmospheric pressure of 28.80 inHg (975 mb), along with rainfall of 10.40 in (264 mm), the highest measured in the state during the storm. A "tremendous wave" traveled up the Indian River, damaging waterfront property. Most avocados and mangos were blown off the trees on Merritt Island, and local horticulture sustained "great losses". At Mims winds ruined 15–20% of the local grapefruit and orange crops. Winds also tore down many oaks, palms, and pines. The hurricane also ripped off the upper front section of a brick structure in Titusville. Local fishermen likened the impact of the storm on the Indian River to those of a storm in about 1871. Near Rockledge strong winds destroyed lightweight housing at a tourist camp. At New Smyrna the storm demolished a makeshift beachfront hangar. The storm rendered the beachfront all but inaccessible to motorists. The hurricane dismantled a then-incomplete woman's club at Coronado Beach. A nearby hotel incurred the collapse of its concrete breakwaters and several walls. Waves damaged the front of the hotel to such an extent that they necessitated the replacement of the structure's foundation. Winds also damaged the roofs of several homes in the area. Beachfront concessions and portions of a boardwalk were wrecked at Daytona Beach. The Halifax River sloshed over its banks, submerging local streets. The storm also destroyed an unfinished hotel at Ponce Park, near Ponce de Leon Inlet. Communications with inland cities such as Orlando, Arcadia, and Lakeland were disrupted.

Once inland over North and Central Florida, the cyclone continued to generate strong winds that flattened crops, agricultural outbuildings, and trees. Residents of Jacksonville judged the storm one of the most significant in recent years. A hurricane-spawned tornado struck a farmstead at Mission City, along Murray Creek, destroying chicken coops and killing approximately 100 chickens. The twister also damaged outbuildings and leveled a garage on the property. At Sanford a tree fell on a bunkhouse, killing a man inside, and 24-hour rainfall totaled 6 in (150 mm), doing much damage to celery. Trees were leveled there and at Orlando and DeLand; homes in these areas were damaged. Gulls were blown 50 mi (80 km) inland, and vessels on Lake Monroe received damage. Losses to crops reached $250,000 at Winter Garden. Citrus losses in Orange County were described as "slight". In the Gulf of Mexico, half a dozen people vanished at sea off Apalachicola and were presumed dead.

=== Georgia, South Carolina, and elsewhere ===
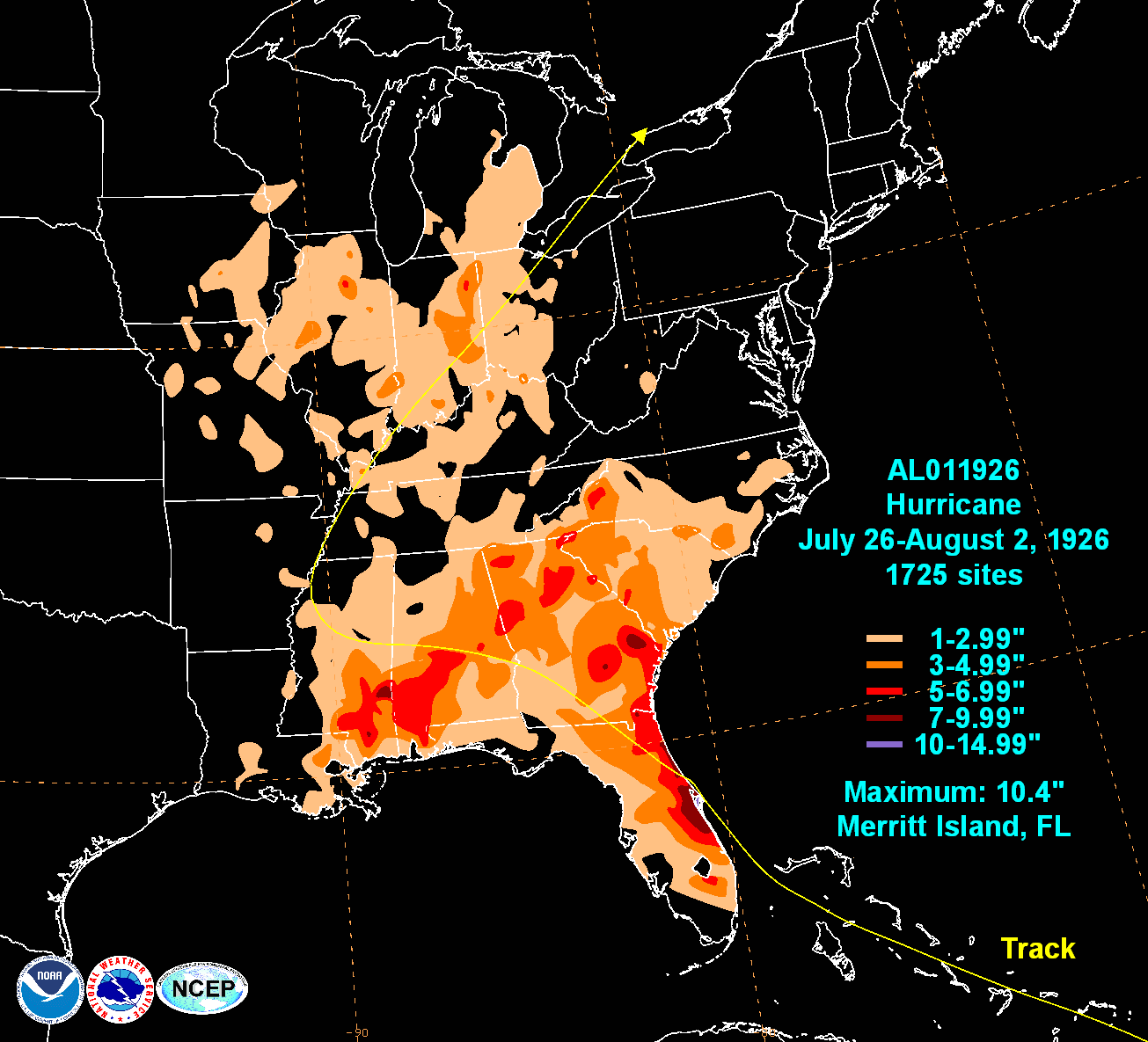
Map of the rainfall totals from the hurricane

Outside Florida, the cyclone yielded heavy rainfall that led to severe flooding and correspondingly extensive damage to summertime cropland. The region between Charleston and Fernandina, Florida, reported washouts. At Savannah, Georgia, the fringes of the cyclone downed several trees and generated above-normal tides. A campsite of the Georgia National Guard was submerged by floodwater, forcing the 121st Infantry Regiment to retreat to higher ground. Their tents and possessions flooded, the men eventually stayed at Fort Screven on Tybee Island. Up to 1 ft (0.33 yd; 0.30 m) of water filled the streets of downtown Savannah, blocking trolley underpasses, while strong winds blew in windows. Winds of 40 mph (64 km/h) hit St. Simons, toppling some trees. A few cottages were partly swept away, along with "several feet" of shoreline. Pressures dipped to 29.32 inHg (993 mb) at Brunswick, where no damage resulted. At Dublin the storm felled trees. Soggy earth gave way near Brooklet, causing a locomotive to slide into a ditch and killing its operator, J.N. Shearhouse, president of the Sherwood Railroad. The storm dropped 1.10 in (28 mm) of rain at Columbus. Crop damage was minimal in Bibb County. Across Georgia rains reduced unpaved roads to mud. At Beaufort, South Carolina, the storm removed fill, flipped a derrick, and pushed a flotel. A tornado destroyed a church and several buildings at Orangeburg, on the edge of the storm, critically injuring a person.

== See also ==
- Hurricanes in the Bahama Archipelago
- List of Puerto Rico hurricanes
- List of tornadoes spawned by tropical cyclones
- 1866 Bahamas hurricane – Caused nearly 400 fatalities in the islands
- 1899 San Ciriaco hurricane – Killed over 330 Bahamians
- 1929 Bahamas hurricane – Meandered over the Bahaman archipelago, causing catastrophic damage

== Sources ==
- Barnes, Jay (1998). Florida's Hurricane History (1st ed.). Chapel Hill, North Carolina: UNC Press. ISBN 0-8078-2443-7 – via Internet Archive.
- Boose, Emory R.; Serrano, Mayara I.; Foster, David R. (1 May 2004). "Landscape and regional impacts of hurricanes in Puerto Rico". Ecological Monographs. 74 (2). Washington, D.C.: Ecological Society of America: 335–52. Bibcode:2004EcoM...74..335B. doi:10.1890/02-4057 – via Wiley.
- Bush, David M.; Neal, William J.; Longo, Norma J.; et al. (2004). Pilkey, Orrin H.; Neal, William J. (eds.). Living with Florida's Atlantic Beaches: Coastal Hazards from Amelia Island to Key West. Living with the Shore. Durham, North Carolina: Duke University Press. ISBN 978-0-822-33289-3 – via Internet Archive.
- Doehring, Fred; Duedall, Iver W.; Williams, John M. (June 1994). Florida Hurricanes and Tropical Storms, 1871–1993: An Historical Survey (Technical report). Technical Paper. Gainesville, Florida: Florida Sea Grant. 71, Florida Hurricanes and Tropical Storms – via National Oceanic and Atmospheric Administration.
- Henry, Alfred J.; Varney, Burton M., eds. (July 1926). "The Nassau hurricane, July 25–26, 1926". Monthly Weather Review. 54 (7). Washington, D.C.: United States Weather Bureau: 296–97. Bibcode:1926MWRv...54..296.. doi:10.1175/1520-0493(1926)54<296:TNHJ>2.0.CO;2 – via American Meteorological Society.
- Landsea, Christopher W.; Glenn, David A.; Bredemeyer, William; Chenoweth, Michael; et al. (May 2008). "A Reanalysis of the 1911–20 Atlantic Hurricane Database" (PDF). Journal of Climate. 21 (10). Boston: American Meteorological Society: 2138–68. Bibcode:2008JCli...21.2138L. doi:10.1175/2007JCLI1119.1 – via Atlantic Oceanographic and Meteorological Laboratory.
- Landsea, Christopher W.; Feuer, Steve; Hagen, Andrew; Glenn, David A.; et al. (1 February 2012). "A Reanalysis of the 1921–30 Atlantic Hurricane Database". Journal of Climate. 25 (3). Boston: American Meteorological Society: 865–85. Bibcode:2012JCli...25..865L. doi:10.1175/JCLI-D-11-00026.1.
- McElroy, Jerome L.; Albuquerque, Klaus (1 January 1986). "Bahamian labor migration, 1901–1963". New West Indian Guide. 60 (3–4). Leiden: Royal Netherlands Institute of Southeast Asian and Caribbean Studies: 167–202. doi:10.1163/13822373-90002059 – via Brill.
- Miner, Roy W. (November–December 1926). "The Bahamas in Sunshine and Storm". Natural History. Vol. 26, no. 6. New York City: American Museum of Natural History. pp. 588–604 – via Internet Archive.
- Mitchell, Alexander J., ed. (July 1926a). "Hurricane, July 26–28, 1926". Florida section. Climatological Data. 30 (7). Washington, D.C.: United States Weather Bureau: 30.
- Mitchell, Charles L. (July 1926b). Henry, Alfred J.; Varney, Burton M. (eds.). "Washington forecast district". Storms and weather warnings. Monthly Weather Review. 54 (7). Washington, D.C.: United States Weather Bureau: 312–14. Bibcode:1926MWRv...54..310.. doi:10.1175/1520-0493(1926)54<312:WFD>2.0.CO;2 – via American Meteorological Society.
- Neely, Wayne (2009). The Great Bahamian Hurricanes of 1926: the Story of Three of the Greatest Hurricanes to Ever Affect the Bahamas. New York City: iUniverse. ISBN 978-1-4401-5174-3 – via Google Books.
  - — (2019). The Greatest and Deadliest Hurricanes to Impact the Bahamas. Cheyenne, Wyoming: UrLink. ISBN 978-1-64753-121-8.
- Pérez, Orlando; Colón, José A., eds. (1970). "Part III" (PDF). Notes on the tropical cyclones of Puerto Rico, 1508–1970 (PDF) (Report). San Juan, Puerto Rico: National Weather Service – via Hurricane Research Division.
  - Part II
- "Severe local hail and wind storms, July, 1926". Monthly Weather Review. 54 (7). Washington, D.C.: United States Weather Bureau: 310–12. July 1926. Bibcode:1926MWRv...54Q.442.. doi:10.1175/1520-0493(1926)54<310:SLHAWS>2.0.CO;2.
- Schoner, R.W.; Molansky, S. (July 1956). "Storms in the south Atlantic coastal region". Storm of July 27–31, 1926 (PDF) (Technical report). National Hurricane Research Project. Washington, D.C.: United States Weather Bureau. pp. 210–11. 3, Rainfall Associated with Hurricanes – via Weather Prediction Center.
- Wallace, E.J.; Donnelly, J.P.; van Hengstum, P.J.; Winkler, T.S.; et al. (March 2021). "1,050 years of Hurricane Strikes on Long Island in The Bahamas". Paleoceanography and Paleoclimatology. 36 (3). Washington, D.C.: American Geophysical Union: 1–22. Bibcode:2021PaPa...36.4156W. doi:10.1029/2020PA004156. hdl:1721.1/141209.2.
