= List of bridges on the National Register of Historic Places in Puerto Rico =

Bridges in Puerto Rico listed on the US National Register of Historic Places

This is a list of bridges and tunnels on the National Register of Historic Places in the U.S. territory of Puerto Rico.

| Name | Image | Built | Listed | Location | Type |
|---|---|---|---|---|---|
| Arenas Bridge | Arenas Bridge | 1894 | 1995-07-19 | Cayey; 18°8′11″N 66°8′18″W | Metal truss |
| Blanco Bridge | Blanco Bridge | 1924 | 1995-07-19 | Utuado | Elliptical concrete arch |
| Bridge No. 122 | | 1918 | 1995-07-19 | Naguabo; 18°11′16″N 65°43′48″W | |
| Cambalache Bridge | | 1893 | 1995-07-19 | Arecibo; 18°27′20″N 66°42′9″W | Double intersection Pratt truss |
| Cayey Bridge | | 1891 | 1995-07-19 | Guayama; 18°0′9″N 66°6′55″W | Iron lateral lattice girder |
| Del Treinta Bridge | | 1924 | 1995-07-19 | Maricao | Rolled steel beam |
| General Méndez Vigo Bridge | | 1898 | 1995-07-19 | Coamo | Brick barrel vault |
| General Norzagaray Bridge | General Norzagaray Bridge | 1855, 1927 | 1995-07-19 | San Juan; 18°21′14″N 66°5′31″W | Brick barrel vault |
| La Liendre Bridge | | 1877 | 1995-07-19 | Cayey; 18°8′11″N 66°7′52″W | Iron lattice lateral girder |
| Las Cabañas Bridge | | 1919 | 1995-07-19 | Adjuntas | |
| Manatí Bridge at Mata de Plátano | | 1905 | 1995-07-19 | Ciales; 18°21′39″N 66°28′45″W | Double intersection Pratt truss |
| Marqués de la Serna Bridge | | 1869, 1881, 1889 | 1995-07-19 | Bayamón; 18°24′17″N 66°9′21″W | Rolled iron segmented arch |
| Martín Peña Bridge | | 1939 | 2008-8-27 | San Juan; 18°24′17″N 66°9′21″W | Art Deco style bridge |
| Mavilla Bridge | | 1903, 1909 | 1995-07-19 | Corozal | Segmented arch |
| Padre Íñigo Bridge | Padre Íñigo Bridge | 1853 | 1995-07-19 | Coamo | Brick barrel vault |
| Plata Bridge | | 1908 | 1995-07-19 | Naranjito; 18.30384°N 66.21132°W | Two Parker truss spans |
| Puente de Añasco | Puente del Río Grande de Añasco | | 2011-1-18 | Añasco/Mayagüez border 18.272599°N 67.161676°W | |
| Puente Blanco | | 1922 | 1984-2-23 | Quebradillas; 18°29′17″N 66°55′35″W | Arch |
| Puente de las Calabazas | | 1882 | 2009-2-17 | Coamo | Lattice girder |
| Puente No. 6 | | | 1984-2-23 | Caguas vicinity 18°17′9″N 66°2′35″W | |
| Puente Río Portugués | | 1933 | 2015-01-06 | Ponce; 17°59′36.2″N 66°36′55.08″W | Art Deco/longitudinal beam |
| Río Hondo Bridge | Río Hondo Bridge | 1908 | 1995-07-19 | Comerío; 18°12′39″N 66°14′36″W | Double Warren pony truss |
| Río Matón Bridge | Río Matón Bridge | 1886 | 1995-07-19 | Cayey; 18°8′30″N 66°12′43″W | Lateral solid web girder |
| Río Piedras Bridge | Río Piedras Bridge | 1853 | 1995-07-19 | San Juan; 18°23′49″N 66°3′21″W | Brick barrel vault |
| San Antonio Railroad Bridge | San Antonio Railroad Bridge | | 2009-9-30 | San Juan vicinity 18°23′49″N 66°3′21″W | |
| Silva Bridge | Silva Bridge | 1897, 1898 | 1995-07-19 | Hormigueros | Pratt pony truss |
| Torréns Bridge | Torréns Bridge | 1878, 1898 | 2000-05-11 | Hormigueros | lattice, transverse joist |
| Villarán Bridge | Villarán Bridge | 1892 | 1995-07-19 | Canóvanas; 18°22′52″N 65°53′33″W | |
