= Puerto Rico Highway 735 =

Highway in Puerto Rico

Highway 735
- Ruta 735

Route information
- Maintained by Puerto Rico DTPW
- Length: 2.7 km (1.7 mi)
- Existed: 1953–present

Major junctions
- South end: PR-1 in Monte Llano–Cayey barrio-pueblo
- PR-738 in Monte Llano–Cayey barrio-pueblo–Rincón; PR-734 in Arenas
- North end: PR-1 in Vegas

Location
- Country: United States
- Territory: Puerto Rico
- Municipalities: Cayey, Cidra

Highway system
- Roads in Puerto Rico; List
← PR-723	→ PR-741

Puerto Rico Highway 735 (PR-735) is a rural road located between the municipalities of Cayey and Cidra, Puerto Rico, and it corresponds to an original segment of the historic Carretera Central. The Arenas and La Liendre old bridges are located on this route.

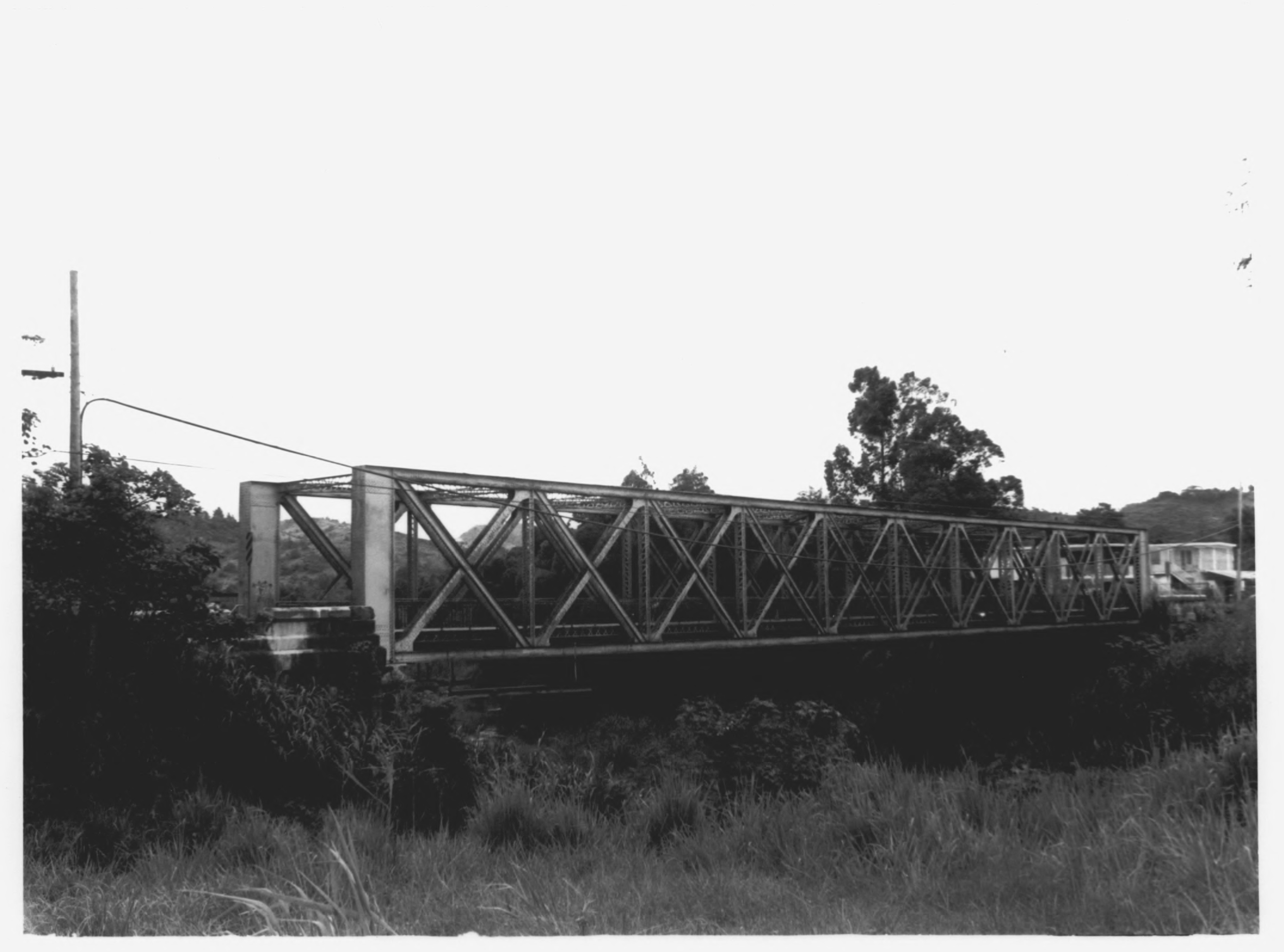
Arenas Bridge

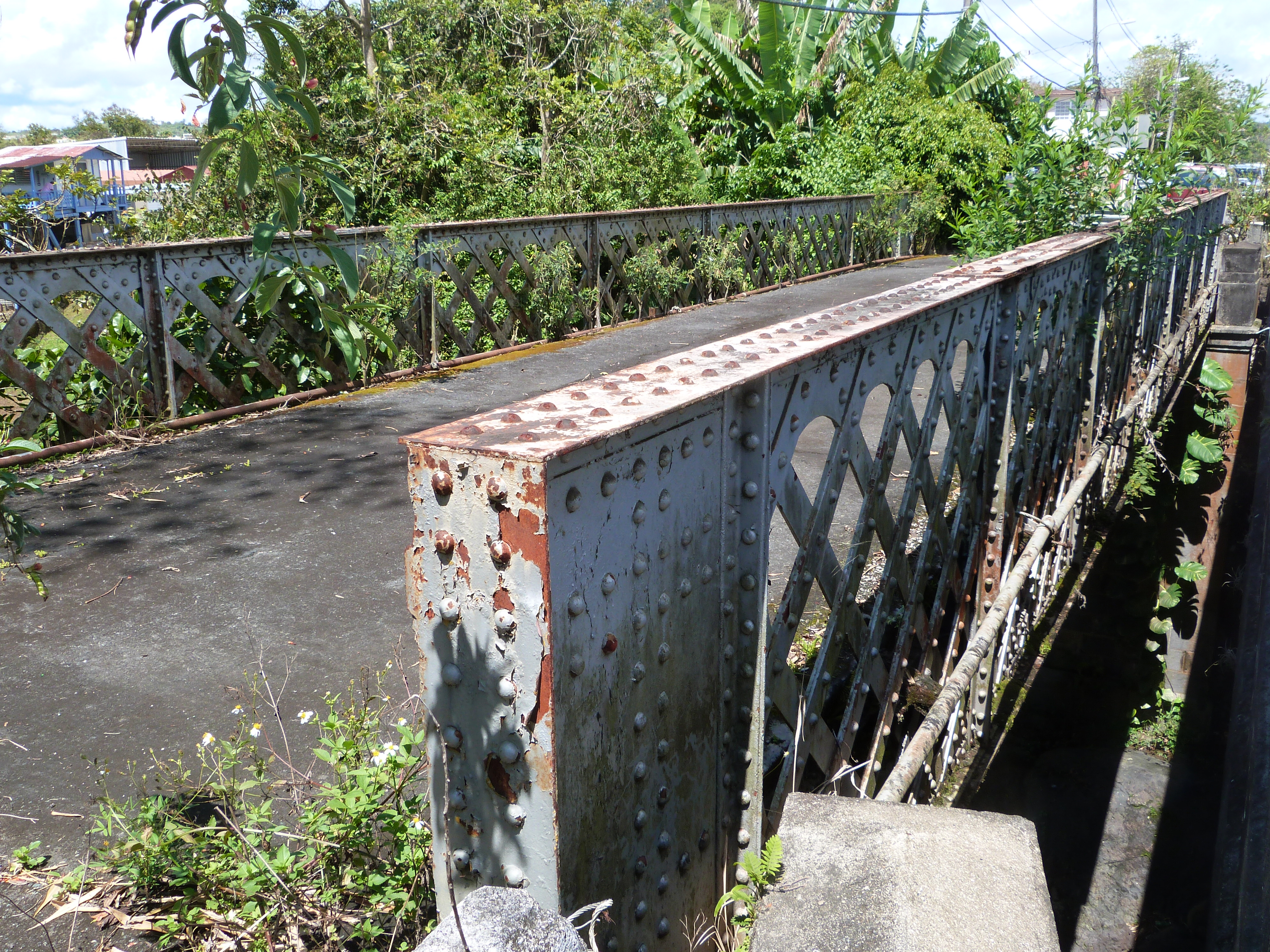
La Liendre Bridge

== Major intersections ==
Municipality	Location	km	mi	Destinations	Notes
Cayey	Monte Llano–Cayey barrio-pueblo line	2.7	1.7	PR-1 – Cayey	Seagull intersection; southern terminus of PR-735; the Carretera Central continues toward Cayey; access to Caguas and Salinas
Cayey	Monte Llano–Cayey barrio-pueblo– Rincón tripoint	2.4	1.5	PR-738	Northern terminus of PR-738; access to PR-1 and Cedro; unsigned
Río de la Plata		1.6– 1.5	0.99– 0.93	Puente Arenas	
Cidra	Arenas	1.2	0.75	PR-734 north – Cidra	Southern terminus of PR-734; cardinal direction changes from north–south to east–west
Quebrada Beatriz		0.7	0.43	Puente La Liendre	
Cayey	Vegas	0.0	0.0	PR-1	Northern terminus of PR-735; the Carretera Central continues toward Caguas; access to Cayey and Salinas
1.000 mi = 1.609 km; 1.000 km = 0.621 mi

== See also ==
- 1953 Puerto Rico highway renumbering
