= Snug =

Snug may refer to:

- Snug (A Midsummer Night's Dream), a character in Shakespeare's A Midsummer Night's Dream
- Snug (piercing), a type of piercing
- Snug, Tasmania, a small town on the D'Entrecasteaux Channel, in the municipality of Kingborough in Tasmania, Australia
- Snug Corner, a town on Acklins island, Bahamas
- Snug, a den or small room
- Snug, a character in the webcomic Ugly Hill
- Snug, a small private room within a public house
