= Cañas River (Naranjito, Puerto Rico) =

River of Puerto Rico

Coordinates: 18.3327291°N 66.2387792°W

- Native name: Río Cañas (Spanish)

Location
- Commonwealth: Puerto Rico
- Municipality: Naranjito

Physical characteristics
- Source
  - location: Cedro Abajo, Naranjito
- Mouth
  - location: La Plata Lake in Quebrada Cruz, Toa Alta
  - elevation: 151 ft.

The Cañas River (Spanish: Río Cañas) is a tributary of La Plata River that flows through the municipalities of Naranjito and Toa Alta in Puerto Rico. Along with its mainstream of La Plata, it is one of the rivers that directly feeds La Plata Lake.

== See also ==
- List of rivers of Puerto Rico
