= La Plata Lake =

Artificial lake in Puerto Rico

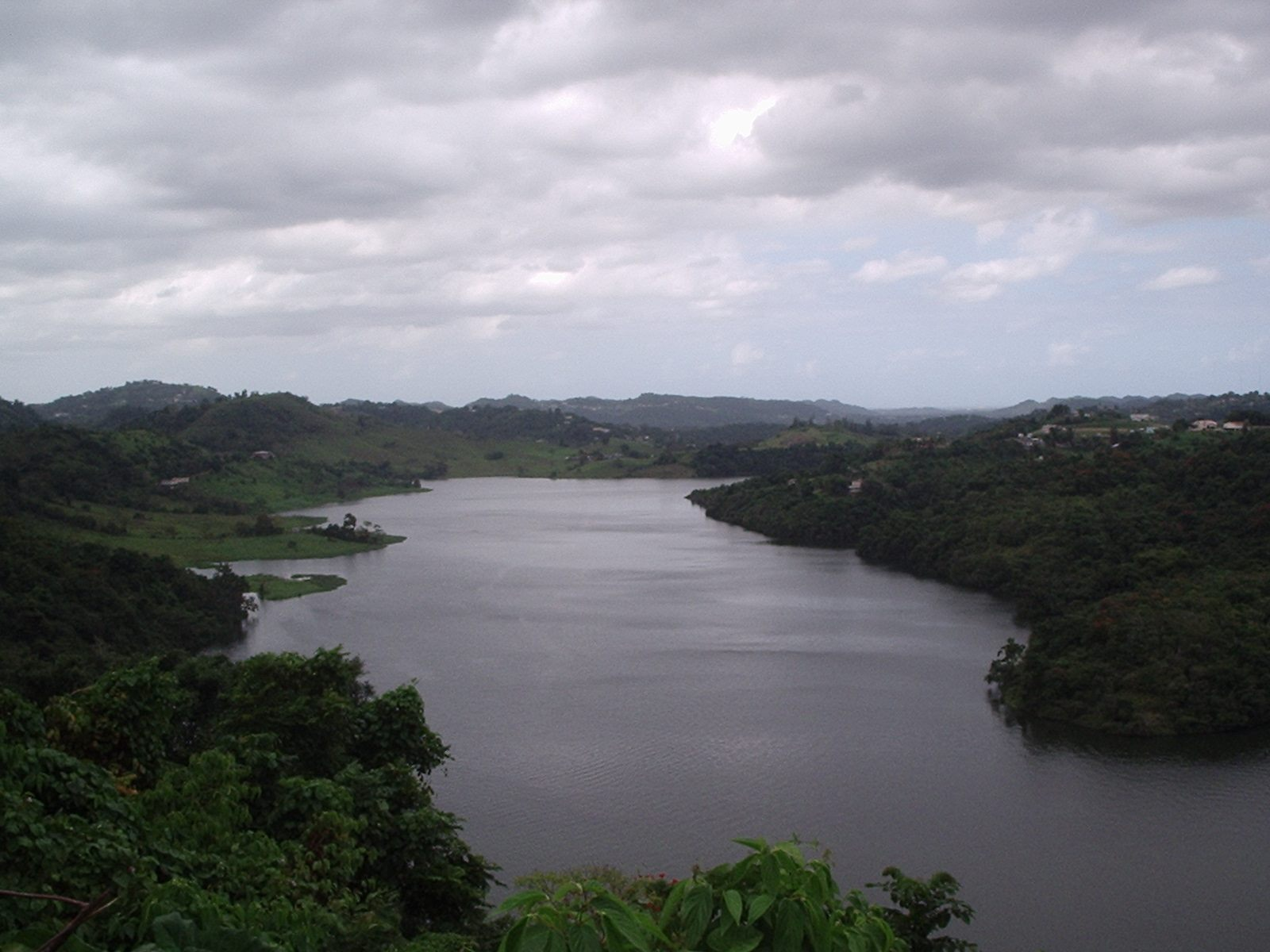
- La Plata Lake from Guadiana barrio

- Location within Puerto Rico
- Location: Naranjito, Toa Alta and Bayamón, Puerto Rico
- Coordinates: 18°20′N 66°14.2′W
- Type: reservoir
- Primary inflows: La Plata River
- Catchment area: 180 sq mi (470 km^{2})
- Basin countries: Puerto Rico
- Surface area: 1.56 m^{2} (16.8 sq ft)
- Average depth: 33 ft (10 m)

La Plata Lake (Spanish: Lago La Plata or Embalse de la Plata) is a reservoir of the La Plata River (Río de la Plata) located in the municipalities of Naranjito, Toa Alta and Bayamón in Puerto Rico. It was created in 1974 and, along the Loíza Lake, is one of the primary suppliers of potable water to the San Juan metropolitan area.

== Geography ==
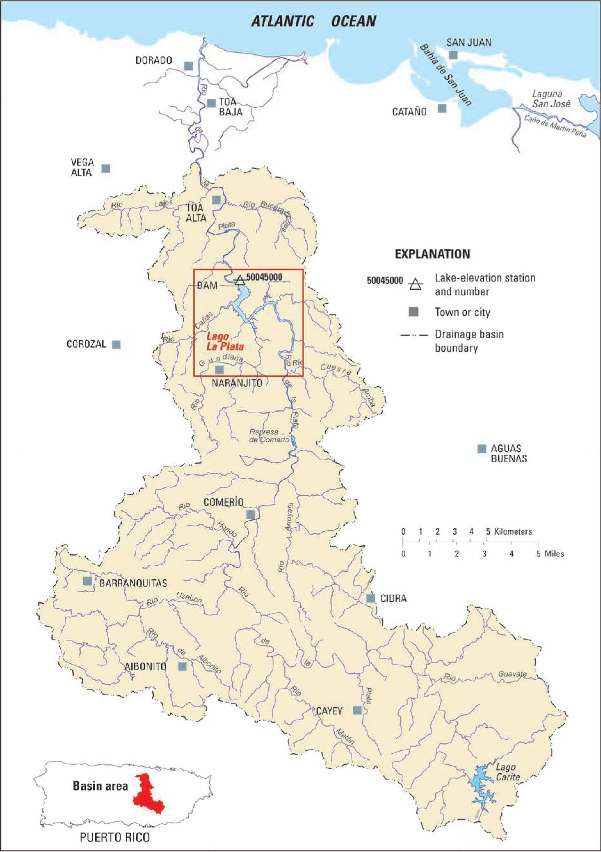
La Plata Lake's drainage basin

La Plata Lake located about 3.1 mi (5 km) south of the town of Toa Alta and 3.1 mi north of the town of Naranjito, with its surface, at normal water levels, situated at an elevation of 171 ft (52 m) above sea level.

=== Hydrology ===
The reservoir has a drainage basin area of roughly 180 sq mi (470 km^{2}), about 90% of which is accounted for by the La Plata River. The Guadiana and Cañas Rivers stand for about 6.2% and 3.5% of the area, respectively.

The lake is about 6.0 mi (9.6 km) long, and about 0.31 mi (0.5 km) across at its widest. It has a surface area of 1.19 sq mi (3.07 km^{2}) and an average depth of 33 ft (10 m).

After its completion the reservoir was estimated to have a storage capacity of 1.420 billion cu ft (40.21 million m^{3}), which has since decreased due to sediment being deposited into the reservoir. The estimated storage capacity had fallen to 1.252 billion cu ft (35.46 million m^{3}) by 1998, to 1.104 billion cu ft (31.27 million m^{3}) by 2006 and to 1.091 billion cu ft (30.88 million m^{3}) by 2016. The average replacement time for water in the reservoir is 28 days.

== Operation ==
A 130 ft (40 m) tall gravity dam constructed in 1974 impounds the reservoir, which is operated by the Puerto Rico Aqueduct and Sewer Authority as part of the San Juan Metropolitan Water District. As of 2013, the reservoir supplied water to cover about 31% of the San Juan metro area's total demand, serving 425,000 people with 83 million US gallons (310,000 m^{3}) of water per day.

== Recreation ==
La Plata Lake is popular for fishing and boating. Portions of the lake basin are also protected as the La Plata Lake Wildlife Refuge, managed by the Puerto Rico Department of Natural and Environmental Resources until 2025, when management of the refuge and its recreational area was granted to the municipal government of Toa Alta.

== See also ==
- Rivers of Puerto Rico
