= Coronado Historic District =

Historic district in Florida, United States

- U.S. National Register of Historic Places
- U.S. Historic district
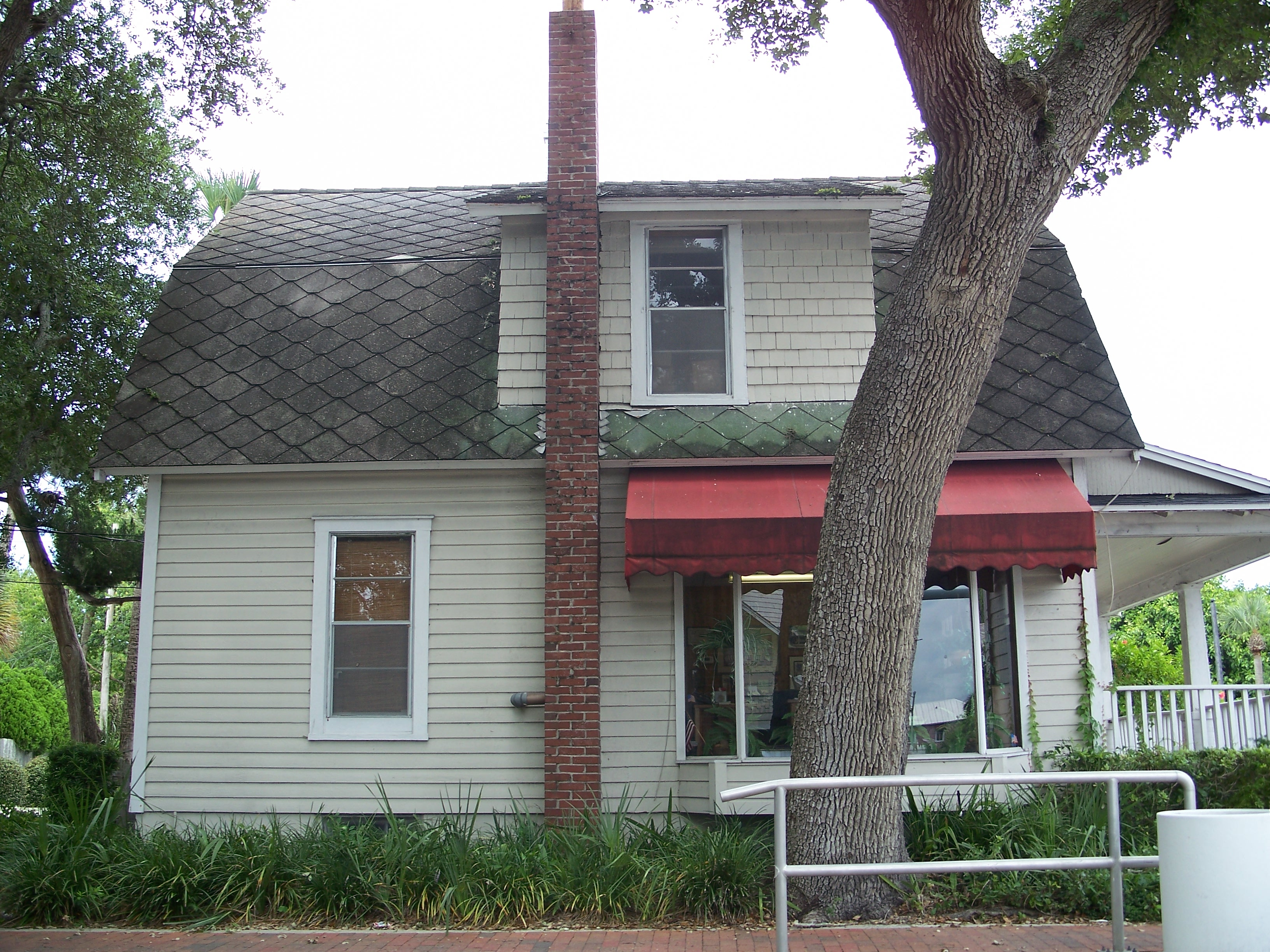
- House in the district

- Location within Volusia County
- Location: New Smyrna Beach, Florida
- Coordinates: 29°2′19″N 80°54′10″W
- Area: 200 acres (0.81 km^{2})
- NRHP reference No.: 97000098
- Added to NRHP: February 21, 1997

The Coronado Historic District is a U.S. historic district (designated as such on February 21, 1997) located in New Smyrna Beach, Florida. The district is bounded by Columbus, Due East, and Pine Avenues, and the Indian River. It contains 83 historic buildings.

== Gallery ==
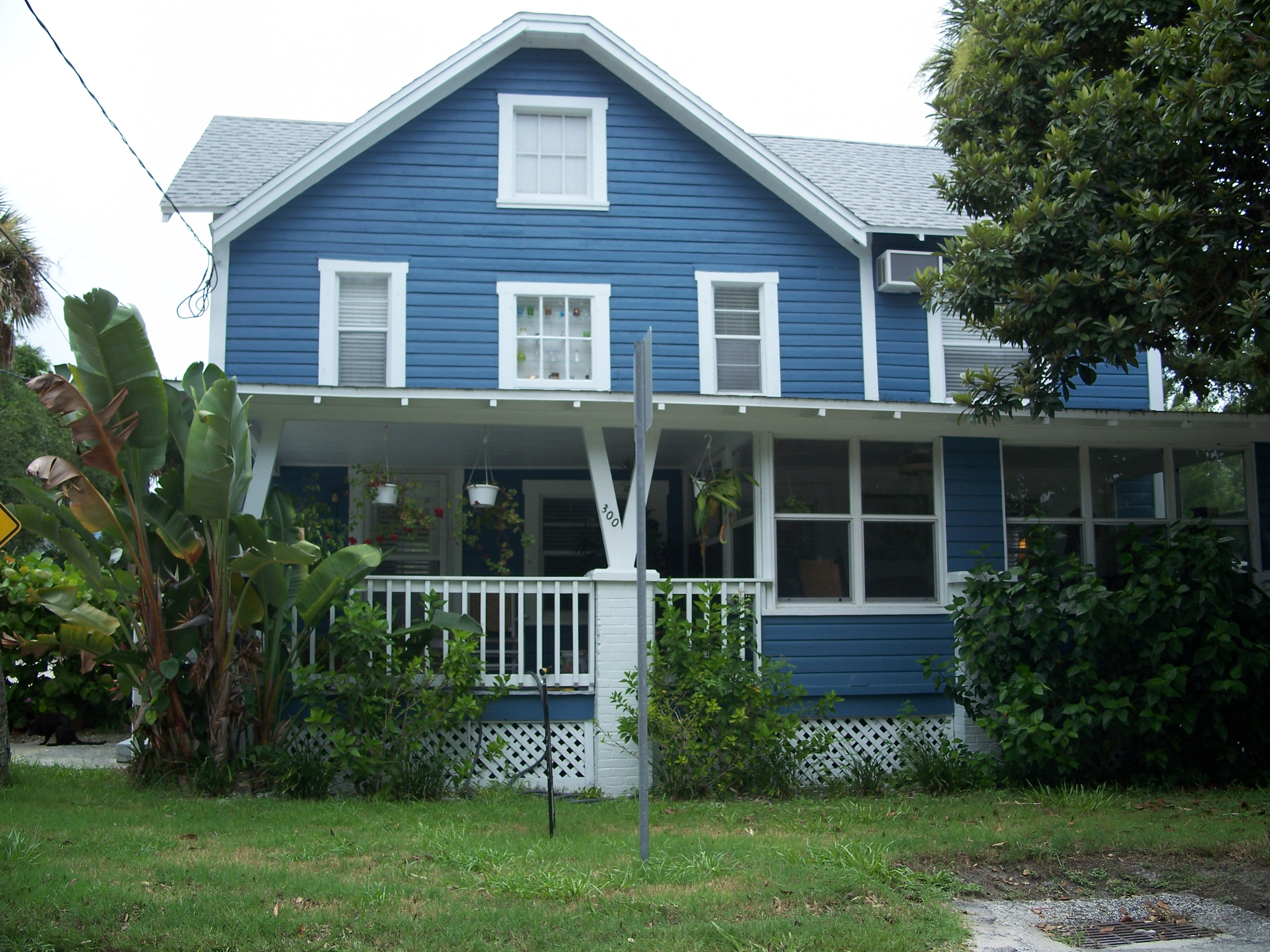

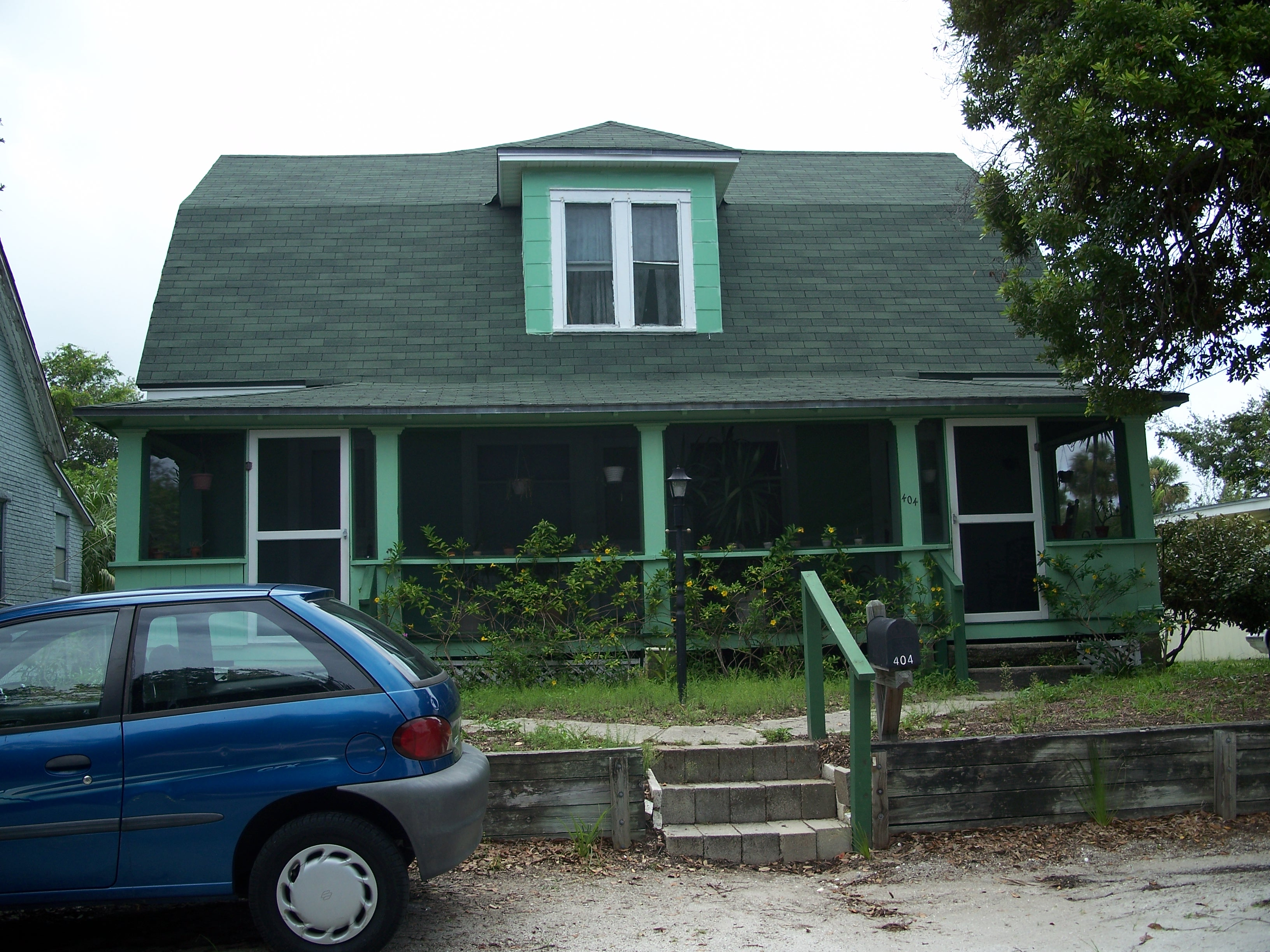

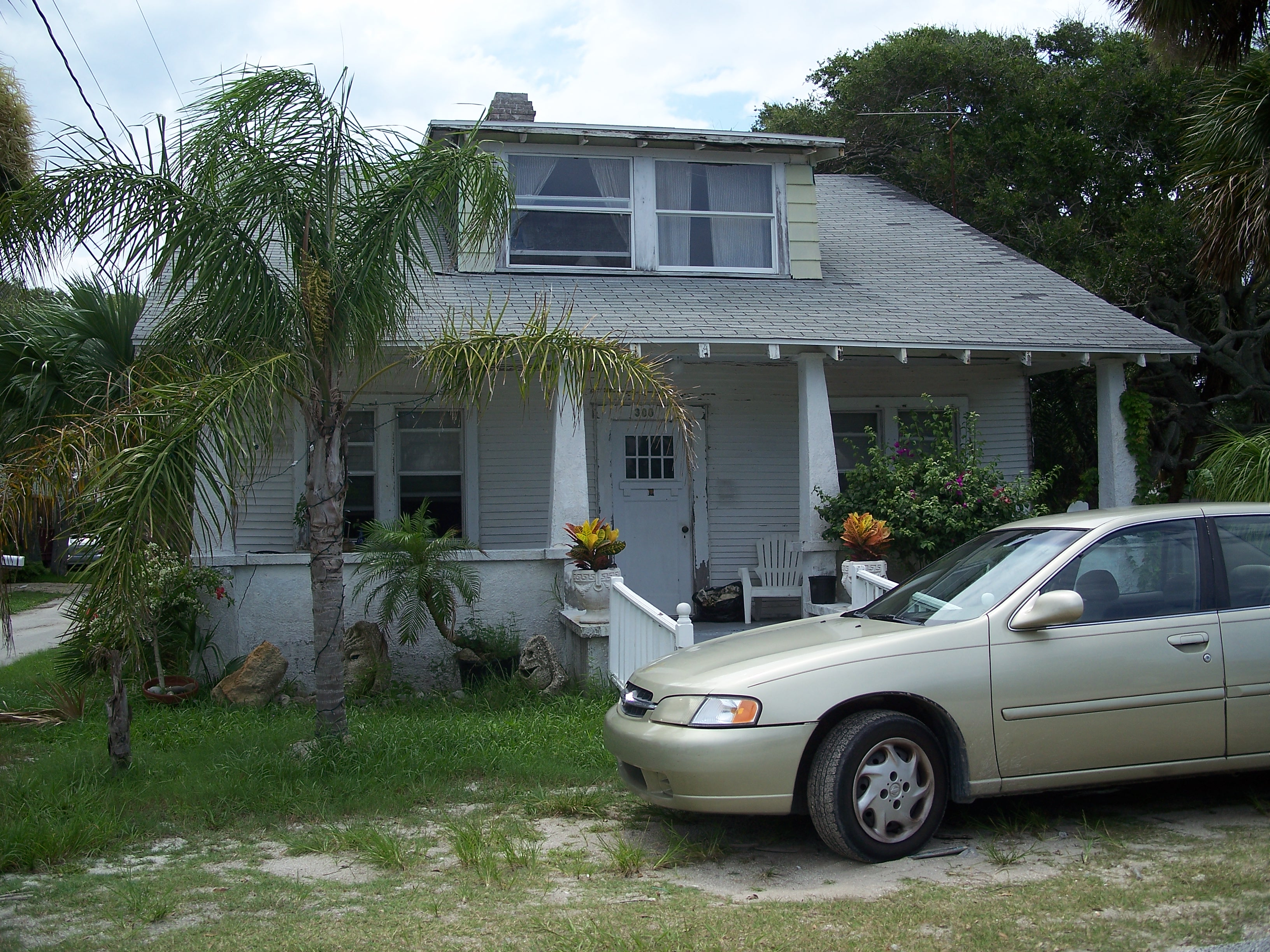
