= Port of San Pedro de Macoris =

Port in Higuamo river, San Pedro de Macoris, Dominican Republic

Port of San Pedro de Macoris is located on the Higuamo river, San Pedro de Macoris, Dominican Republic. This port is mainly used to discharge bulk fertilizer, cement, clinker, coal, wheat, diesel and LPG. It is also used to export sugar and molasses produced by several sugar cane mills in the region.

== Overview ==
The Port of San Pedro de Macoris is the oldest harbor in the country; It was built by the end if the 19th century. This port used to receive most of the operations for the Port of Santo Domingo, because this one was unable to handle that capacity of boats in that moment.

SPM Port received operations from Europe and the United States.

This harbor became the Pan American World Airways hydro-hub for air operations making at the same time, the port to be unable to keep receiving maritime operations.

This terminal is currently being restructured and recuperated and is handling individual cargo operations.

== See also ==
- List of ports and harbours of the Atlantic Ocean

== Port information ==
- Location: 18°26′48″N 69°18′41″W
- Local time: UTC−4
- Weather/climate/prevailing winds: From May 15 until September 15
- Climate: mostly sunny, tropical. Hurricane season runs from June to November
- Prevailing winds: direction ENE–ESE
- Average temperature range: 28C–30 °C
