= Current Island =

Island in the Bahamas

- Location within Bahamas

Geography
- Location: Atlantic Ocean
- Coordinates: 25.3633°N 76.8149°W
- Archipelago: Lucayan Archipelago

Administration
- Bahamas

Demographics
- Population: 38 (2010)

Additional information
- Time zone: EST (UTC-5)
  - Summer (DST): EDT (UTC-4)
- ISO code: BS-NE

Current Island is an island in the Bahamas, located in the district of North Eleuthera. The island had a population of 38 at the 2010 census. The island is separated from the island of North Eleuthera by a channel known as the Current Cut, which is a site used for diving.

Bird species found on the island include the Bahama swallow (callichelidon cyaneoviridis), black-whiskered vireo (vireosylva calidris barbaiula), the Bahama bananaquit (coereba bahamensis) the Bahama ground dove (columbigallina passerina bahamensis), and the Bahaman bullfinch (pyrrhulagra violacea).
