= Indian Creek (Miami Beach) =

Waterway in Miami Beach, Florida, United States

Coordinates: 25.820136°N 80.123506°W

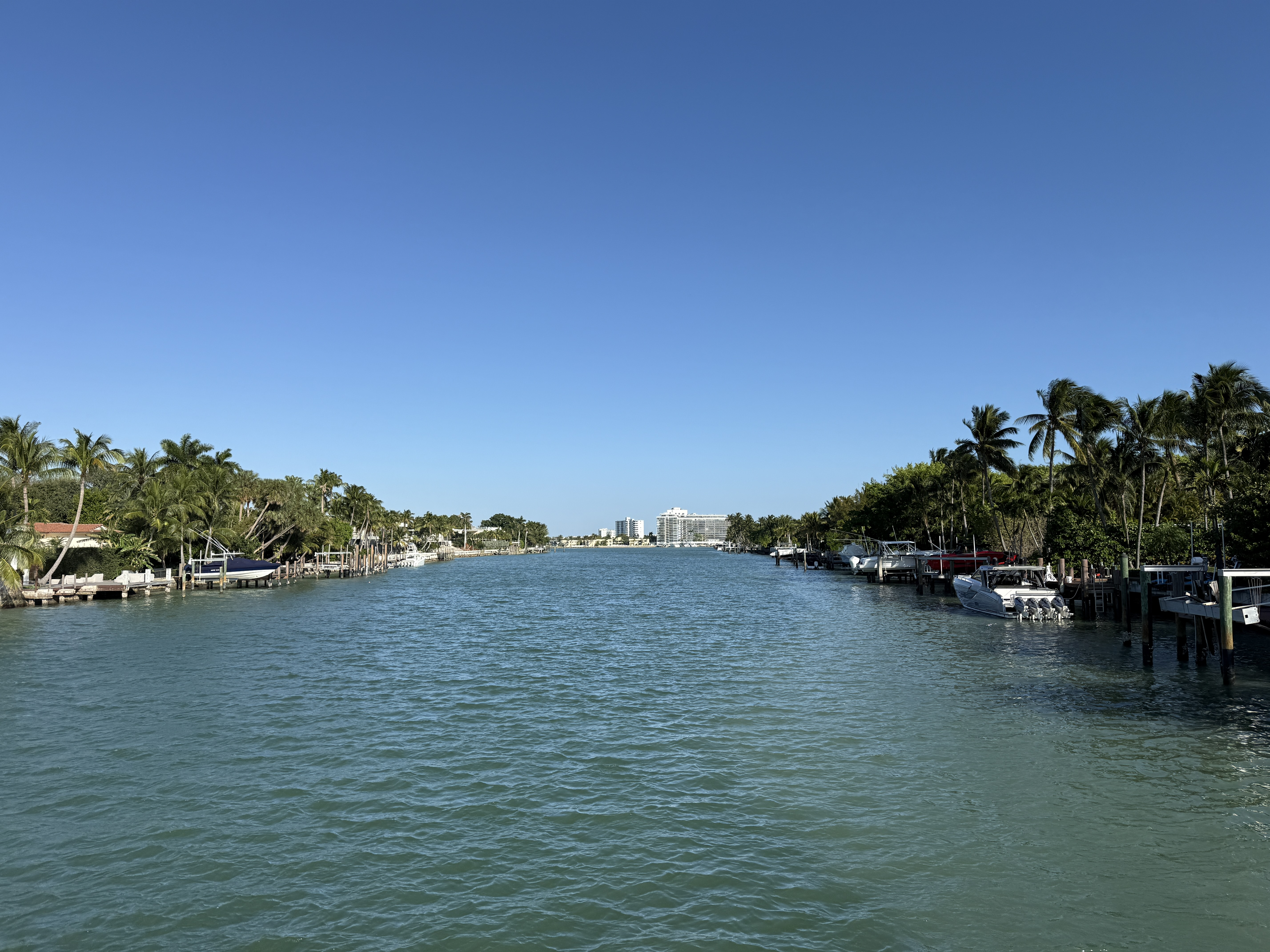
Indian Creek west of Allison Island

Indian Creek is a partly natural and partly man-made waterway in the city of Miami Beach, Florida, United States. It starts as a man-made canal where Biscayne Bay meets Lincoln Road, and runs along Dade Boulevard, forming the boundary between South Beach and the rest of the city. At 24th street the canal opens into the natural waterway and continues north through the city past Allison Island where it opens into Biscayne Bay, until 71st Street where it merges with Normandy and Tatum Waterways and is no longer called Indian Creek. The barrier island touts only 40 waterfront property parcels arranged around an ultra private 18-hole golf course which is why it is referred to as the Billionaire Bunker. Southbound is named Indian Creek Drive wherever the road runs along the creek.
