= Allison Island =

Island in the United States of America

Coordinates: 25.845977°N 80.123806°W

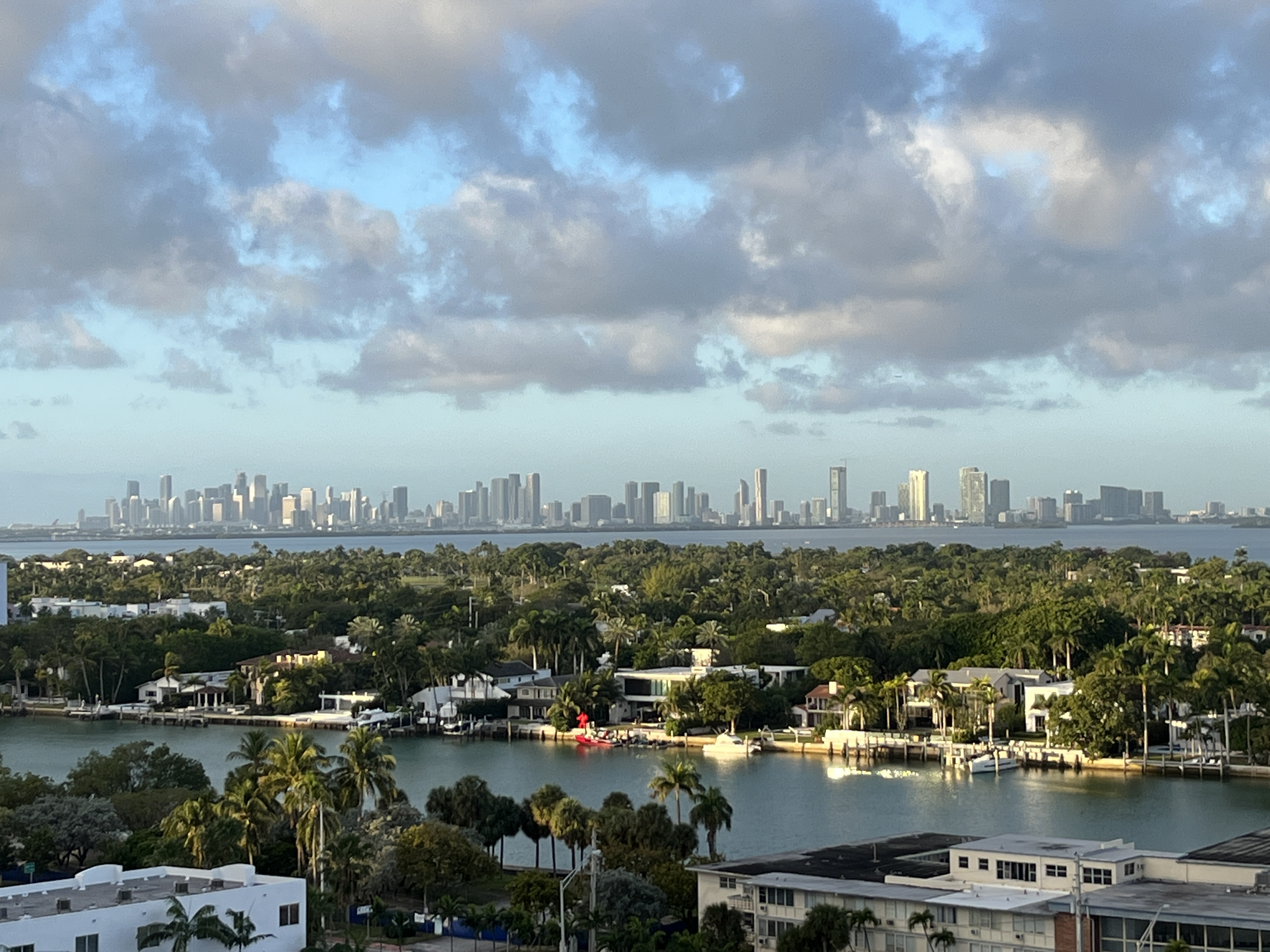
Allison Island (foreground) from Miami (North) Beach.

Allison Island is an island within the city of Miami Beach in Miami-Dade County, Florida, United States. It is located inside the Indian Creek waterway in the La Gorce neighborhood, in the area of the city referred to as North Beach.
