= Del Treinta Bridge =

- U.S. National Register of Historic Places
- Puerto Rico Historic Sites and Zones
- Location within Puerto Rico
- Location: Highway 128, km 32.7 Maricao, Puerto Rico
- Coordinates: 18°10′00″N 66°51′48″W
- Built: 1924
- Architect: Enrique Ortega
- Architectural style: Rolled steel beam
- MPS: Historic Bridges of Puerto Rico MPS
- NRHP reference No.: 95000846
- RNSZH No.: 2000-(RC)-22-JP-SH

Significant dates
- Added to NRHP: July 19, 1995
- Designated RNSZH: March 15, 2001

The Prieto River Bridge (Spanish: Puente del Río Prieto), also known as Bridge #261 and better known as the "Del Treinta" Bridge (Puente Del Treinta, a shortening of Puente del Sector Treinta), is a historic bridge located in the Indiera Alta barrio of the municipality of Maricao, Puerto Rico. It was built in 1924 as part of a highway construction boom that occurred in the island during the 1920s. The bridge spans across the Prieto River in the Luis Muñoz Marín Scenic Route (Ruta Panorámica Luis Muñoz Marín) and was added to the National Register of Historic Places in 1995 and to the Puerto Rico Register of Historic Sites and Zones in 2001.

== See also ==
- List of bridges documented by the Historic American Engineering Record in Puerto Rico
