= La Liendre Bridge =

Historic bridge in Cayey and Cidra municipalities, Puerto Rico

- U.S. National Register of Historic Places
- Puerto Rico Historic Sites and Zones
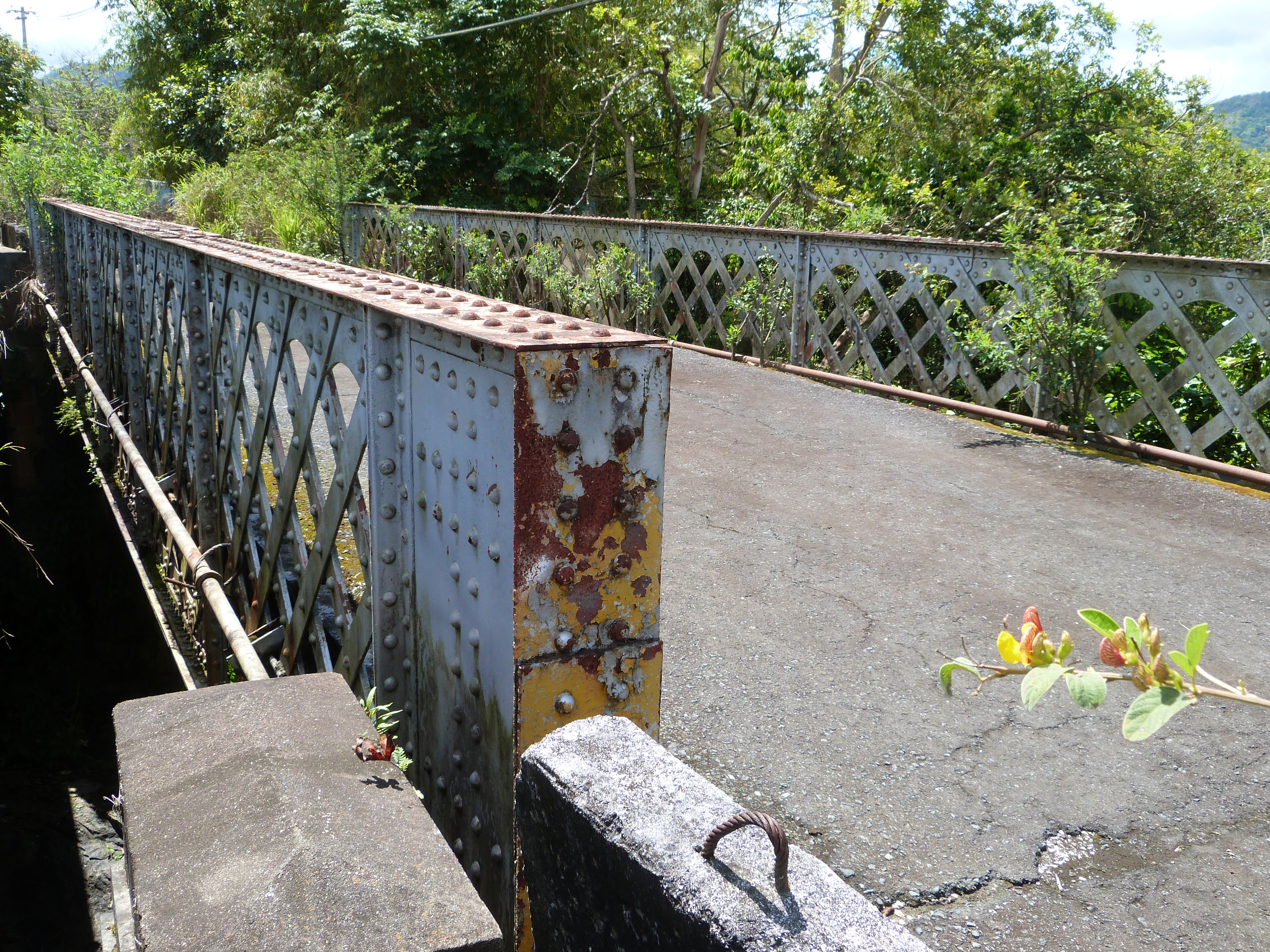

- Location within Puerto Rico
- Nearest city: Cayey, Puerto Rico
- Coordinates: 18°08′11″N 66°07′52″W
- Area: less than one acre
- Built: 1877
- Built by: Eugene Rollin and Co.
- Architect: Manuel Lopez-Bayo
- Architectural style: iron lattice lateral girder
- MPS: Historic Bridges of Puerto Rico MPS
- NRHP reference No.: 95000844
- RNSZH No.: 2000-(RCE)-21-JP-SH

Significant dates
- Added to NRHP: July 19, 1995
- Designated RNSZH: December 21, 2000

The La Liendre Bridge, spanning Beatriz Creek, a tributary to the Río de la Plata, between Cayey, Puerto Rico and Cidra, Puerto Rico. It was built in 1877 and was listed on the National Register of Historic Places in 1995, and on the Puerto Rico Register of Historic Sites and Zones in 2000.

It is a rare type of bridge in the U.S. or its territories, one of a handful of lattice girder bridges imported from France and Belgium to Puerto Rico between 1877 and 1892. It has lattice girders with transverse joists. It was on the Carretera Central highway of Puerto Rico, between Cayey and Caguas.

It is Bridge No. 467 mentioned in a review of historic bridges in Puerto Rico.

It is a single-span 17.9 metres (59 ft) long bridge.

In 1994 it was still in use on Puerto Rico Highway 735, bringing it about fifty feet over the bed of Beatriz Creek.
