= Río de la Plata (Puerto Rico) =

River of Puerto Rico

La Plata River
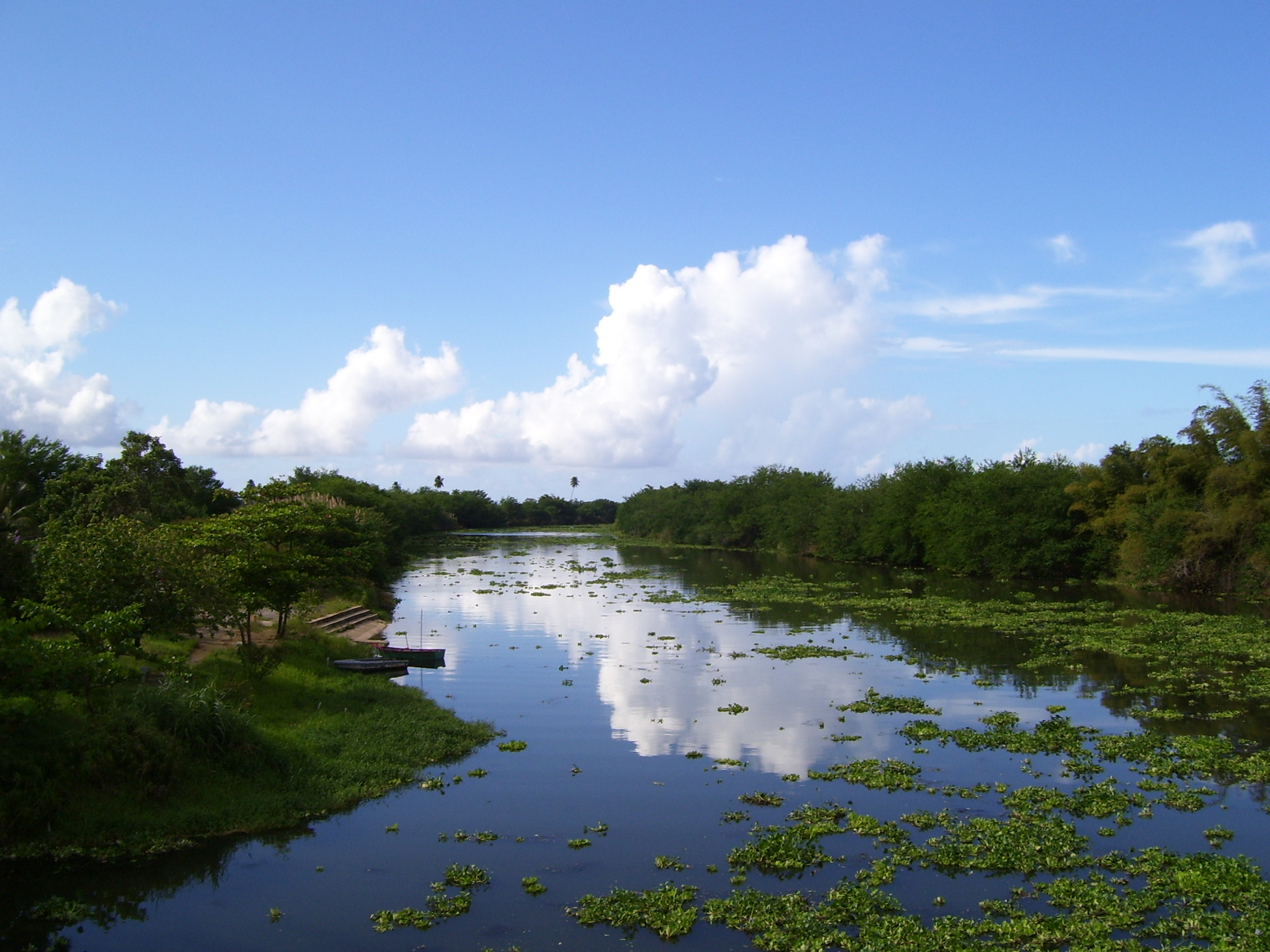
- La Plata River in 2007
- Native name: Río de la Plata (Spanish)

Location
- Commonwealth: Puerto Rico
- Municipalities: Guayama, Cayey, Comerío, Naranjito, Toa Alta, Toa Baja, and Dorado

Physical characteristics
- Source
  - location: Guayama, Puerto Rico
- Mouth
  - location: Atlantic Ocean, at Dorado
  - coordinates: 18°28′33″N 66°15′19″W
- Length: 46 mi (74 km)

Basin features
- Tributaries
  - left: Chiquito, Matón, Usabón, Hondo, Guadiana, Cañas and Nuevo
  - right: Guavate, Arroyata and Cuesta Arriba

La Plata River (Spanish: Río de la Plata) is the longest river in Puerto Rico. It is located in the north coast of the island. It flows from south to north, and drains into the Atlantic Ocean about 11 miles (18 km) west of San Juan. The mouth of the river is a resort area with white sandy beaches.

== Geography ==
La Plata has a length of approximately 74 kilometres (46 mi) with its origin in the municipality of Guayama, Puerto Rico, at an altitude of approximately 2,625 feet (800 meters) above sea level. It crosses the municipalities of Guayama, Cayey, Comerío, Naranjito, Toa Alta, Toa Baja, and Dorado. It is impounded by dams which hold two reservoirs in its path: Carite Lake and La Plata Lake. The Comerio hydroelectric dams also impound portions of the river.

There are many crossings of the river, including the Arenas Bridge in Cayey, notable for being a 1894 steel bridge built that is still in use today. It was the longest bridge built in Puerto Rico by the Spanish. Another notable bridge that passes over the river is the Jesús Izcoa Moure Bridge, a cable-stayed bridge which straddles the city borders of Naranjito, Toa Alta and Bayamon.

== History ==
La Plata River (2005)

=== Hurricane Maria ===
The river, which runs through the heart of Comerio, rose more than 3.4 metres (11 ft) on September 20, 2017 (Hurricane Maria) causing major flooding and irreparable destruction to areas along the river. It destroyed the school, the police station, countless homes and businesses in Comerio, and other municipalities along the river.

=== Flood control project ===
In mid 2018, the United States Army Corps of Engineers announced it would be undertaking a major flood control project of the river basin, with a $500 million budget. By mid 2019, a project by the USACE to mitigate the flooding risk to Toa Baja by The Plata River had not yet begun.

== Cultural references ==
It is popularly said that Taíno referred to the river as "thoa" which means mother, which itself gave the name to the towns of Toa Alta and Toa Baja located in the mouth of the river to the Atlantic Ocean. The river is referenced on the anthem of the town of Toa Baja.

== Gallery ==
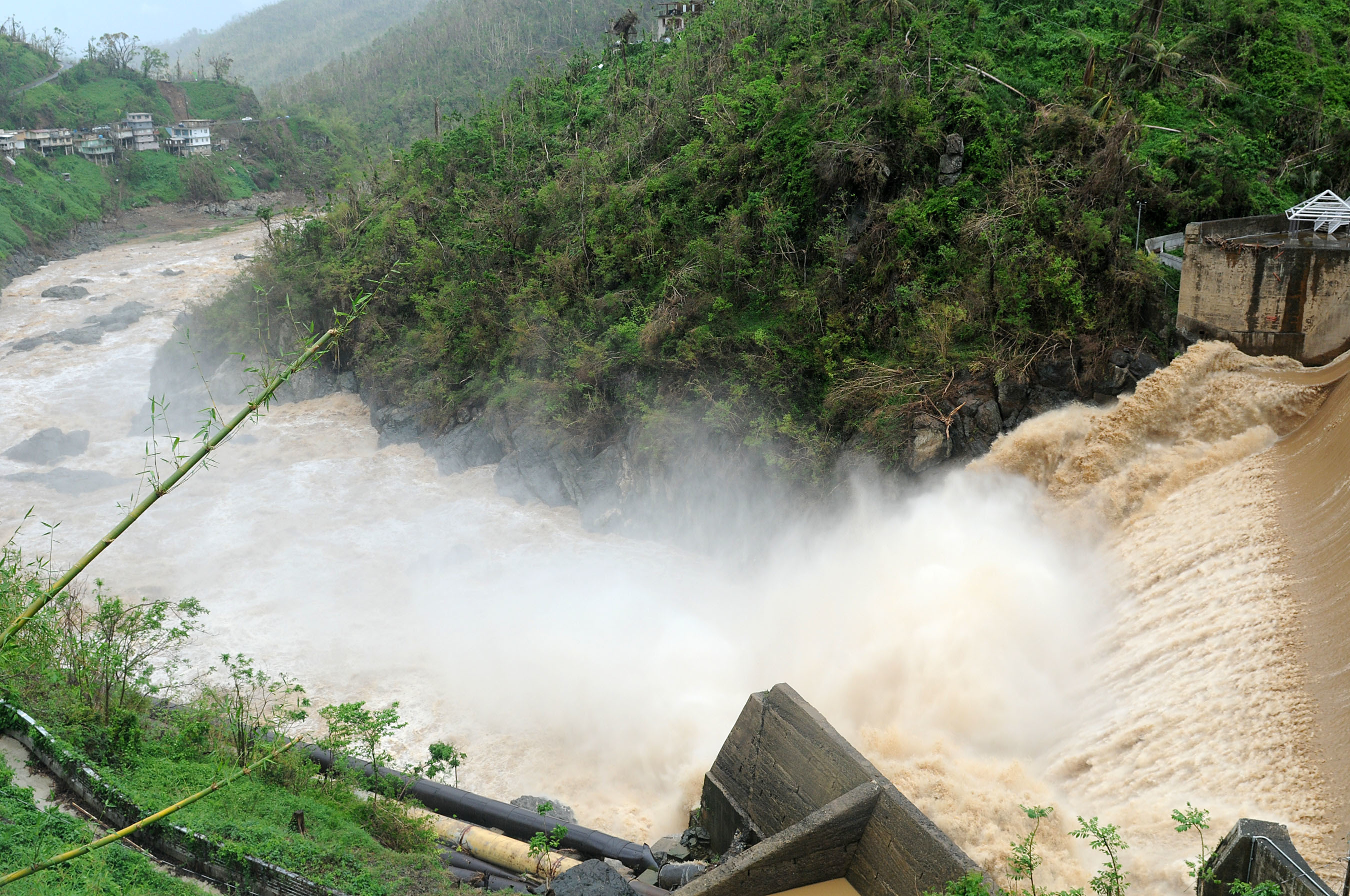
Dam at Río de la Plata in Comerío

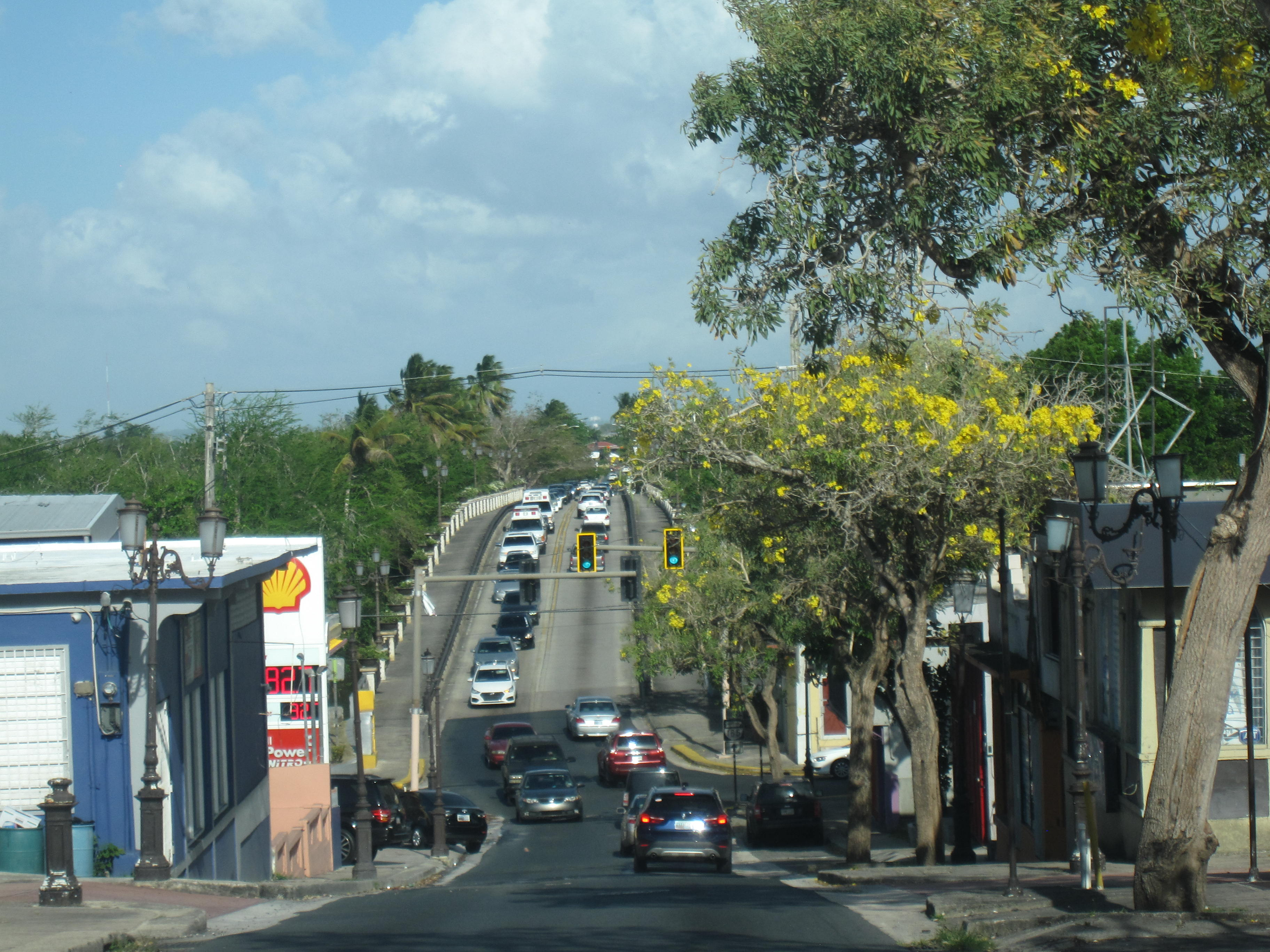
Bridge on Calle Méndez Vigo over Río de la Plata in Dorado

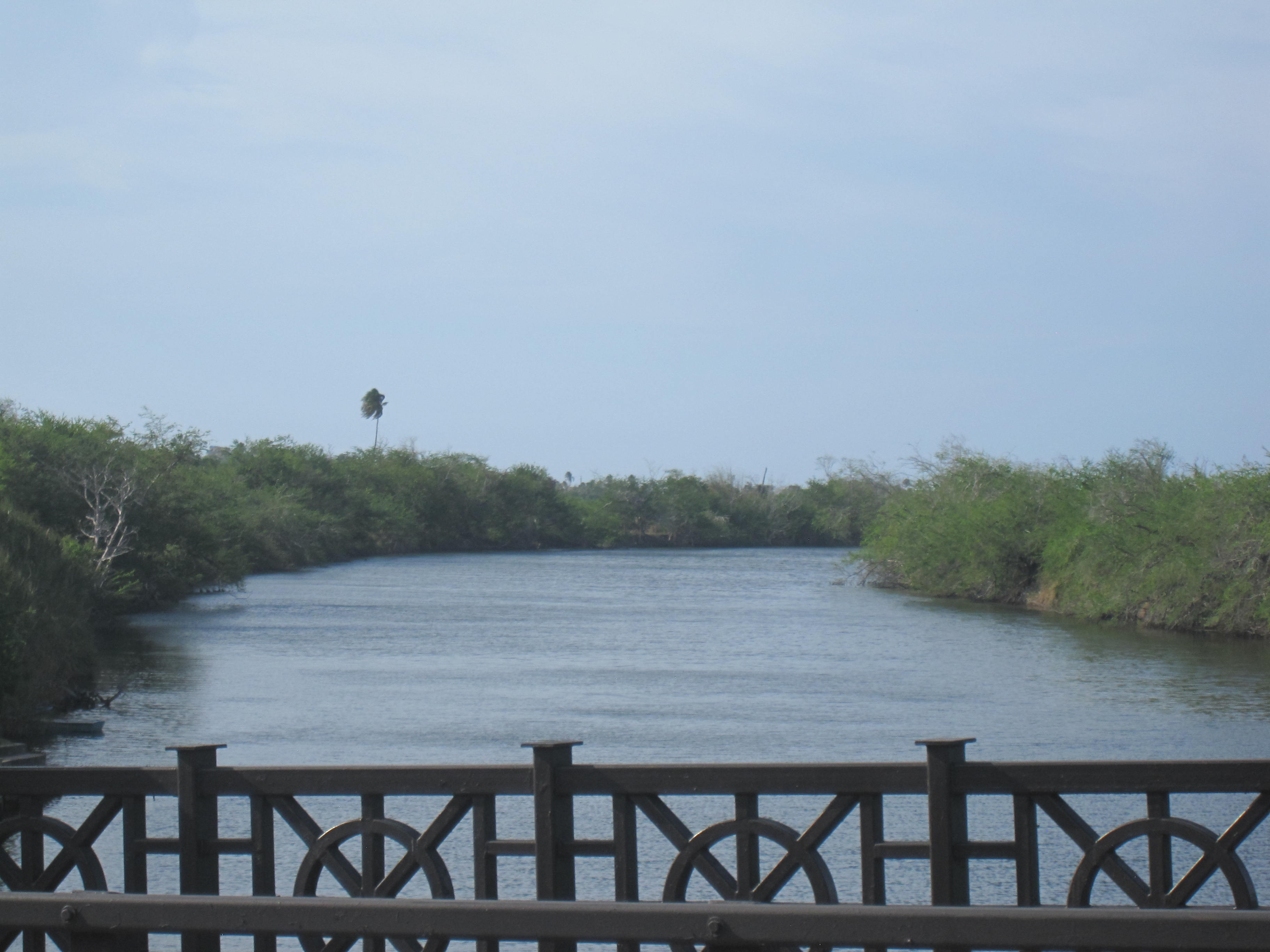
Río de la Plata from Bridge on Calle Méndez Vigo in Dorado

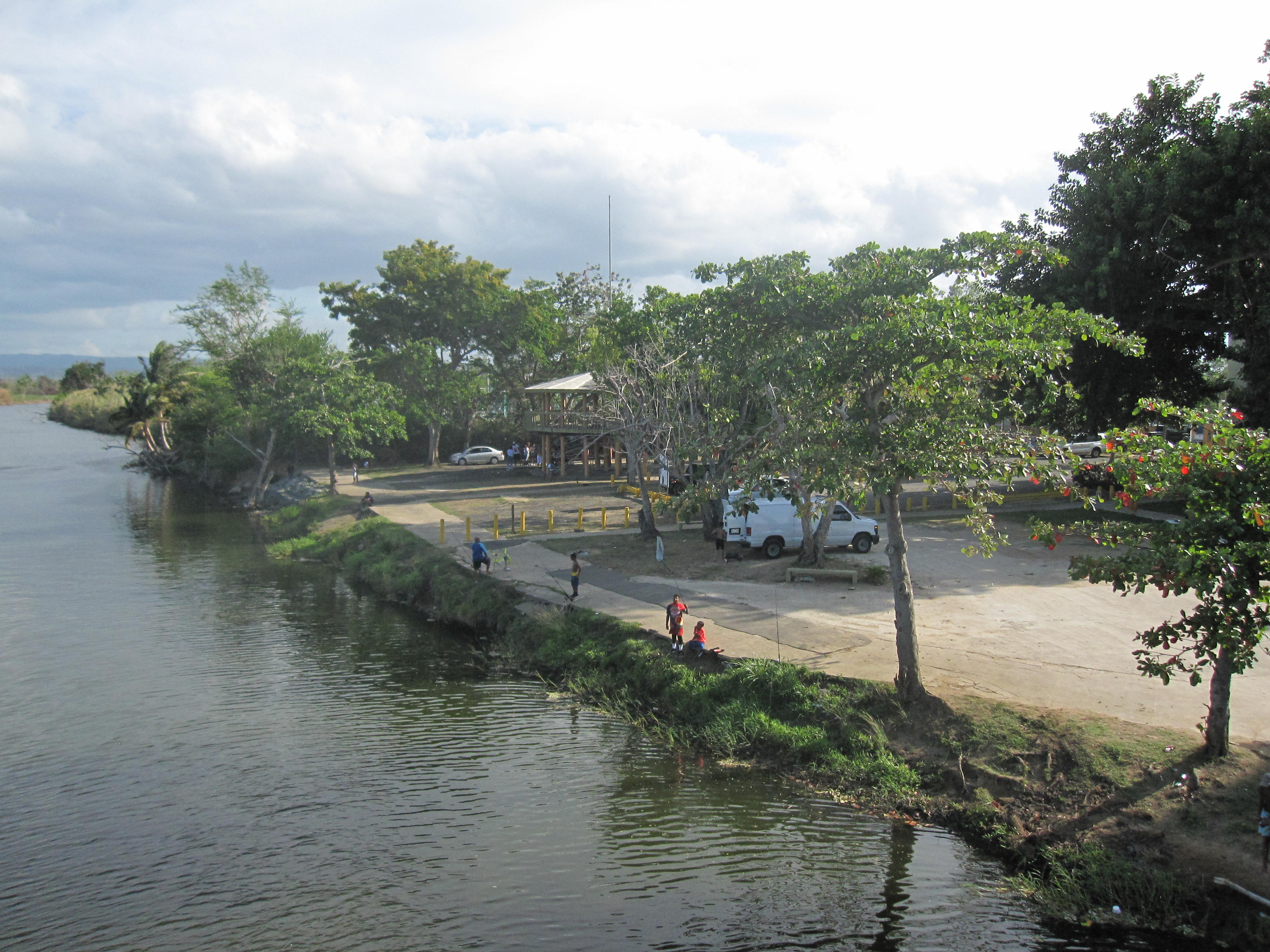
View of river from bridge on Calle Méndez Vigo in Dorado

== See also ==
- Arenas Bridge: NRHP-listed bridge over the river
- La Liendre Bridge: NRHP-listed bridge over a tributary
- Plata Bridge: NRHP-listed bridge over the river
- List of rivers in Puerto Rico
