= Snug Corner =

- Snug Corner, Acklins Island, Bahamas
- Location within Bahamas
- Coordinates: 22°32′N 73°53′W
- Country: Bahamas
- Island: Acklins Island
- Elevation: 6 m (20 ft)

Population (2012)
  - City: 548
  - Urban: 548
- Time zone: UTC-5 (Eastern Time Zone)
- Area code: 242
- Website: None

Snug Corner is a town in the south of the Bahamas. It is located on Acklins island.
