= Cuyón, Coamo, Puerto Rico =

Barrio of Puerto Rico

Cuyón
- Barrio
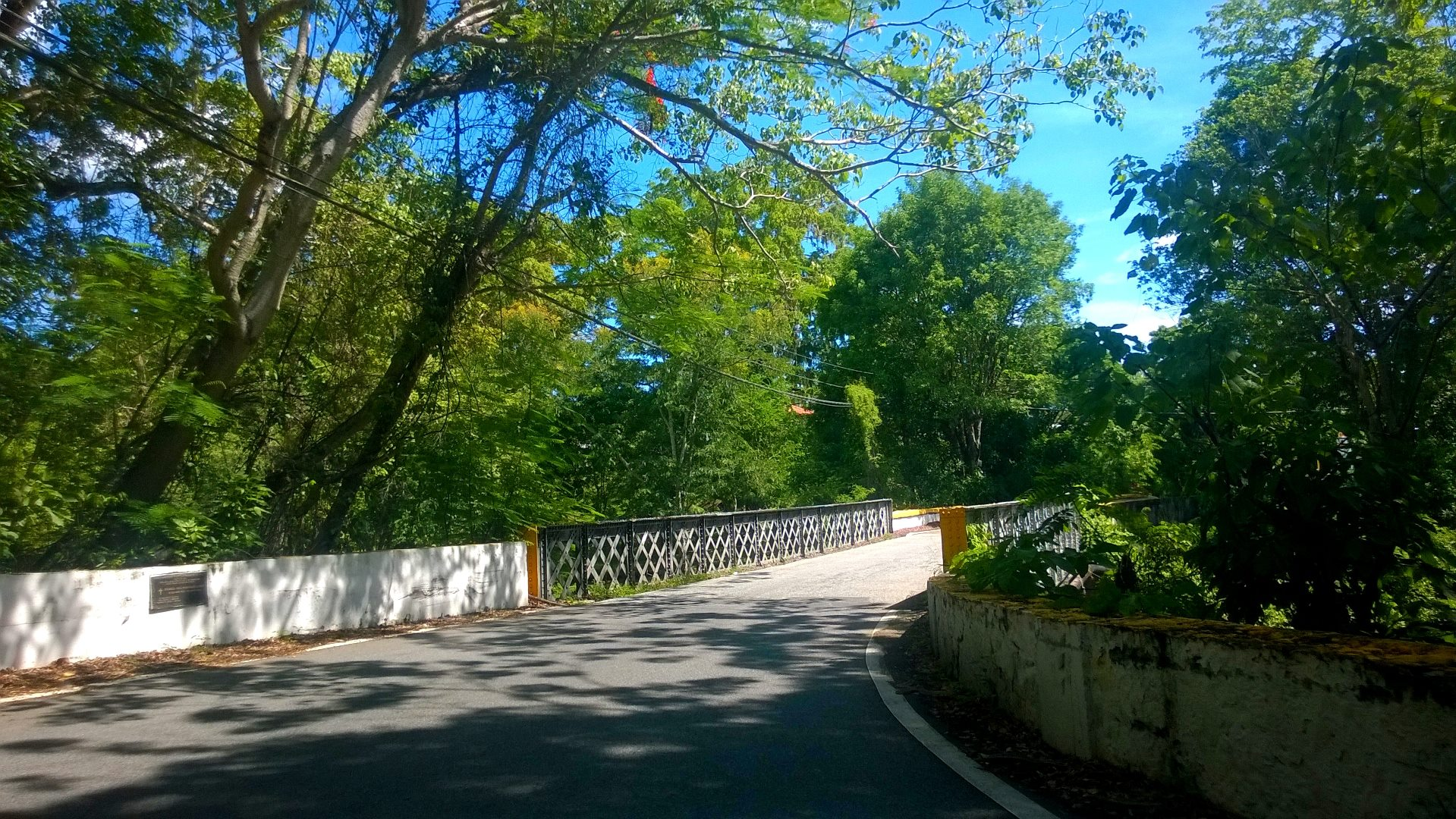
- Puente de las Calabazas in Cuyón barrio

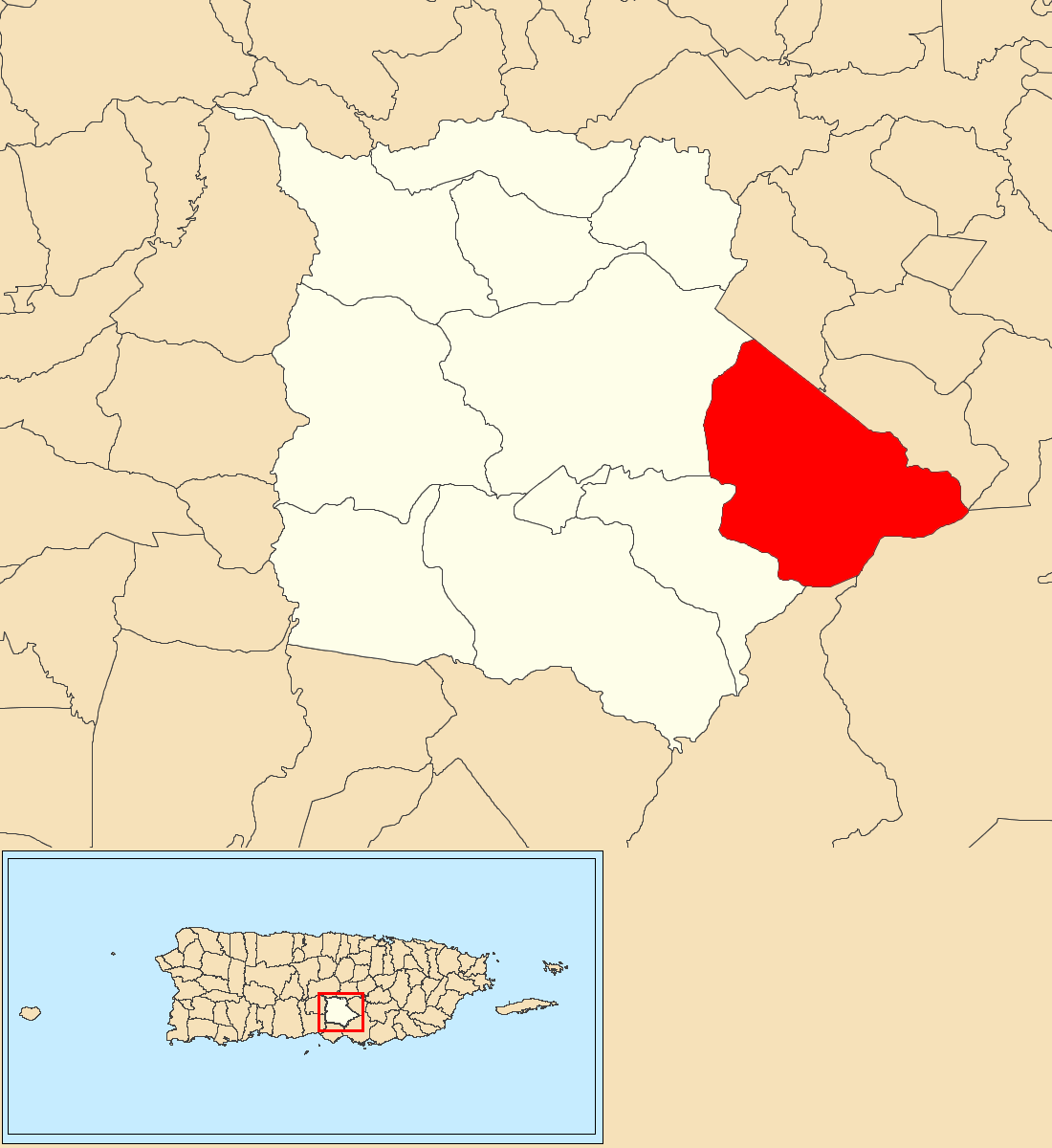
- Location of Cuyón within the municipality of Coamo shown in red

- Location of Puerto Rico
- Coordinates: 18°05′23″N 66°18′07″W
- Commonwealth: Puerto Rico
- Municipality: Coamo

Area
  - Total: 10.15 sq mi (26.3 km^{2})
  - Land: 10.15 sq mi (26.3 km^{2})
  - Water: 0 sq mi (0 km^{2})
- Elevation: 906 ft (276 m)

Population (2010)
  - Total: 3,077
  - Density: 303.2/sq mi (117.1/km^{2})
- Source: 2010 Census
- Time zone: UTC−4 (AST)
- ZIP Code: 00769
- Area code: 787/939

Cuyón is a barrio in the municipality of Coamo, Puerto Rico. Its population in 2010 was 3,077.

The Cuyón River runs through this barrio and through Aibonito.

== History ==
Cuyón was in Spain's gazetteers until Puerto Rico was ceded by Spain in the aftermath of the Spanish–American War under the terms of the Treaty of Paris of 1898 and became an unincorporated territory of the United States. In 1899, the United States Department of War conducted a census of Puerto Rico finding that the combined population of Cuyón and Palmarejo barrios was 1,397.

Historical population
Census	Pop.	Note	%±
1910	725		—
1920	772		6.5%
1930	773		0.1%
1940	1,146		48.3%
1950	876		−23.6%
1960	624		−28.8%
1970	572		−8.3%
1980	947		65.6%
1990	1,766		86.5%
2000	2,263		28.1%
2010	3,077		36.0%
U.S. Decennial Census; 1900 (N/A) 1910-1930; 1930-1950 1980-2000 2010

== Gallery ==
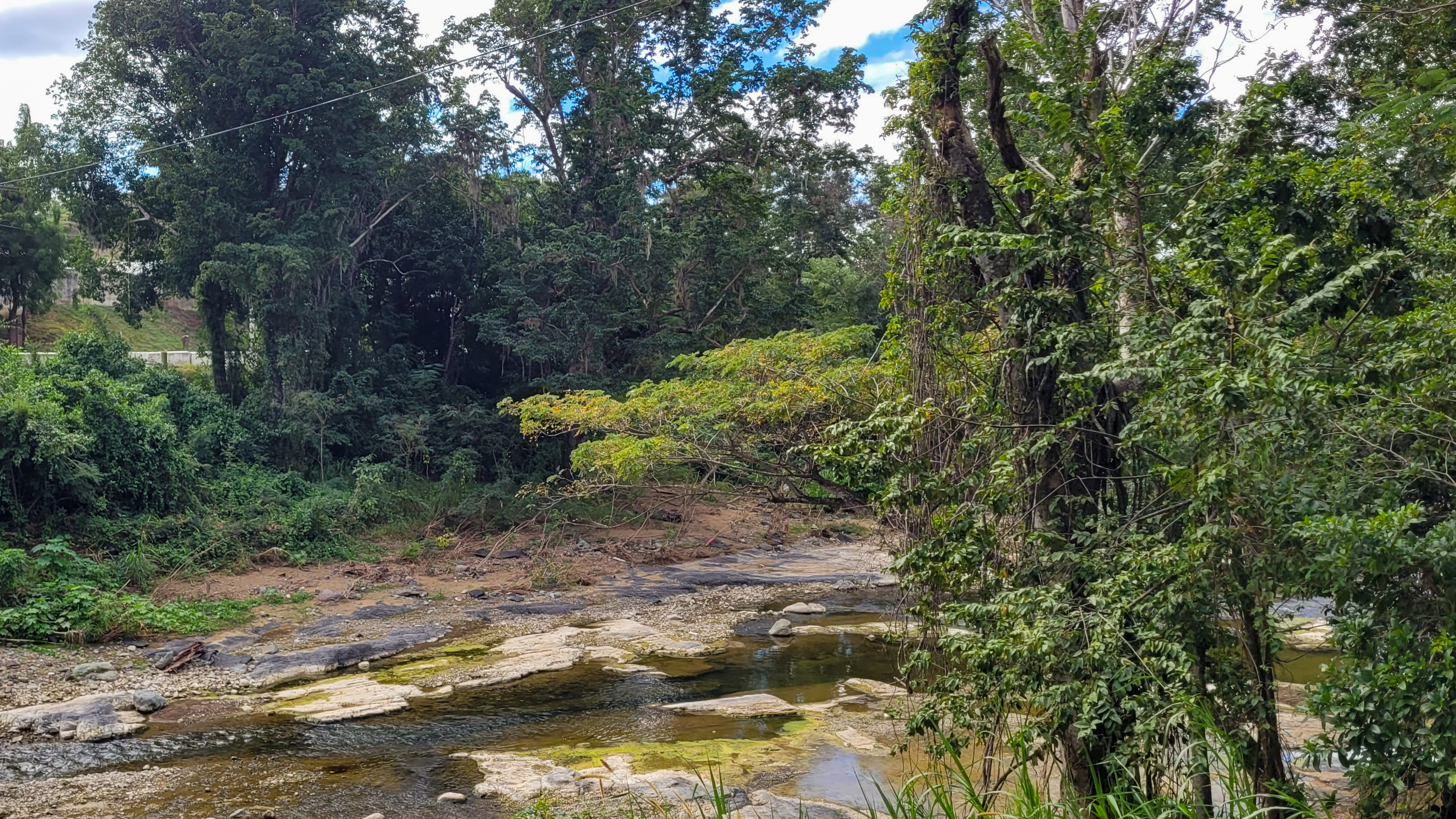
Cuyón River in Cuyón barrio

== See also ==
- List of communities in Puerto Rico
