= Coamo barrio-pueblo =

Historical and administrative center (seat) of Coamo, Puerto Rico

Coamo barrio-pueblo Pueblo de Coamo
- Municipality Seat
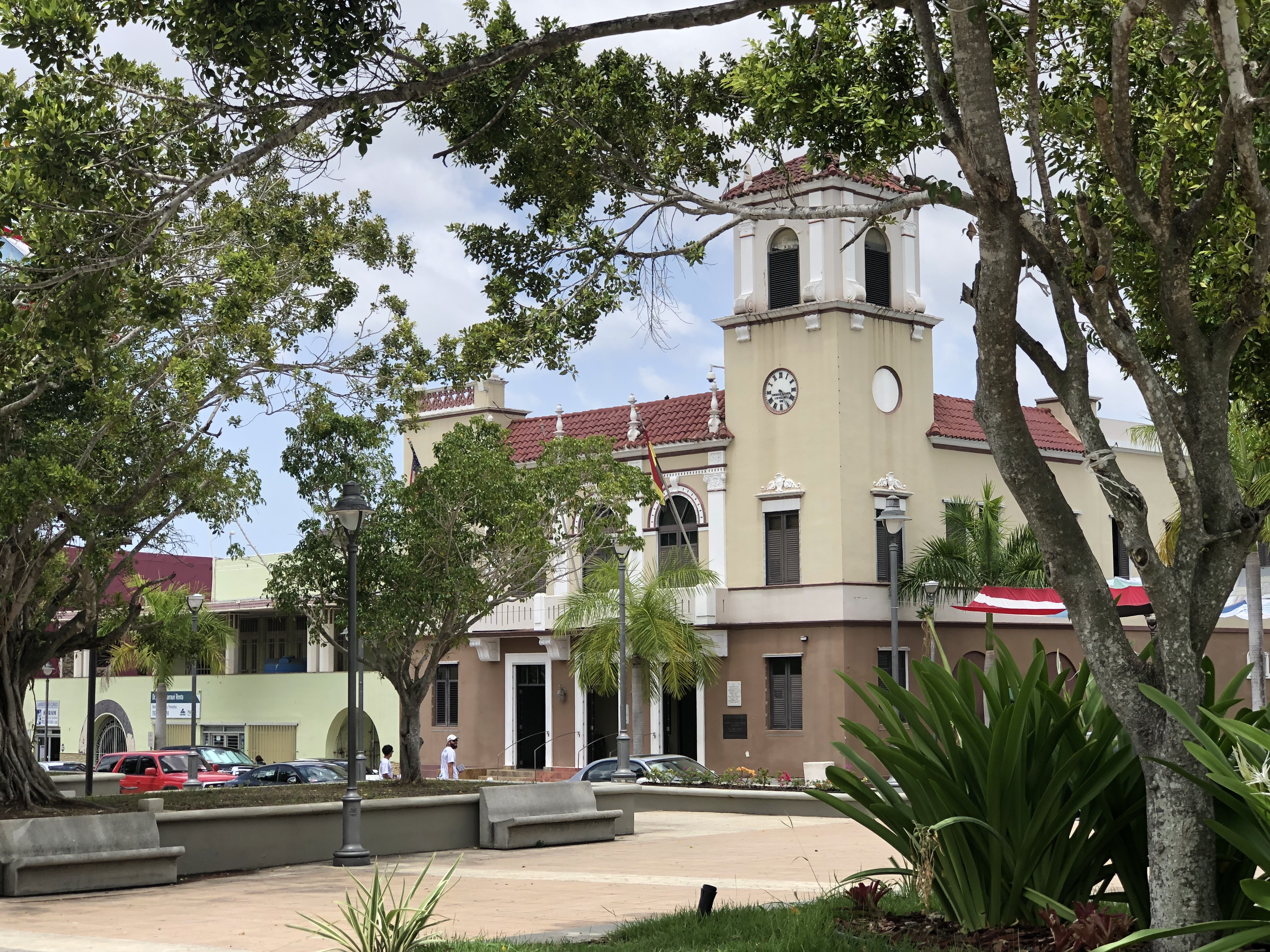
- Coamo City Hall

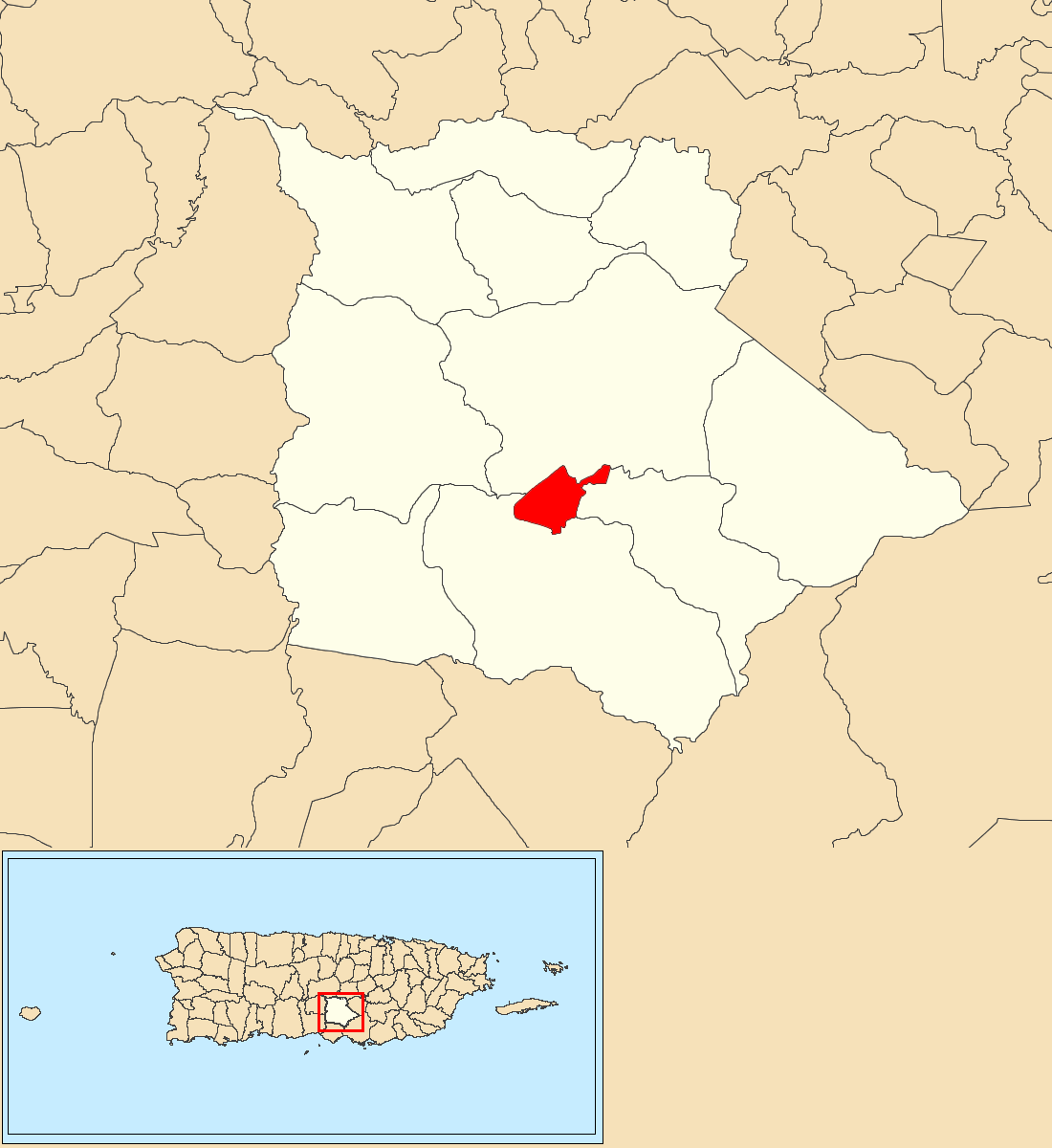
- Location of Coamo barrio-pueblo within the municipality of Coamo shown in red

- Location of Puerto Rico
- Coordinates: 18°04′42″N 66°21′36″W
- Commonwealth: Puerto Rico
- Municipality: Coamo

Area
  - Total: 0.89 sq mi (2.3 km^{2})
  - Land: 0.89 sq mi (2.3 km^{2})
  - Water: 0 sq mi (0 km^{2})
- Elevation: 397 ft (121 m)

Population (2010)
  - Total: 6,685
  - Density: 7,511.2/sq mi (2,900.1/km^{2})
- Source: 2010 Census
- Time zone: UTC−4 (AST)
- ZIP Code: 00769
- Area code: 787/939

Coamo barrio-pueblo is a barrio and the administrative center (seat) of Coamo, a municipality of Puerto Rico. Its population in 2010 was 6,685.

Due to its historical value, the historic downtown district (pueblo) of Coamo was added to the Puerto Rico Register of Historic Sites and Zones (Spanish: Registro Nacional de Sitios y Zonas Históricas) on July 19, 1995.

As was customary in Spain, in Puerto Rico, the municipality has a barrio called pueblo which contains a central plaza, the municipal buildings (city hall), and a Catholic church. Fiestas patronales (patron saint festivals) are held in the central plaza every year.

Historical population
Census	Pop.	Note	%±
1910	3,869		—
1920	4,259		10.1%
1930	5,831		36.9%
1940	8,691		49.0%
1950	11,592		33.4%
1960	12,146		4.8%
1970	0		−100.0%
1980	10,244		—
1990	9,026		−11.9%
2000	7,573		−16.1%
2010	6,685		−11.7%
U.S. Decennial Census; 1900 (N/A) 1910-1930; 1930-1950 1980-2000 2010

== The central plaza and its church ==
The central plaza, or square, is a place in the barrio-pueblo for official and unofficial recreational events and a place where people can gather and socialize from dusk to dawn. The Laws of the Indies, Spanish law, which regulated life in Puerto Rico in the early 19th century, stated the plaza's purpose was for "the parties" (celebrations, festivities) (Spanish: a propósito para las fiestas), and that the square should be proportionally large enough for the number of neighbors (Spanish: grandeza proporcionada al número de vecinos). These Spanish regulations also stated that the streets nearby should be comfortable portals for passersby, protecting them from the elements: sun and rain.

Located across the central plaza in Coamo barrio-pueblo is the Parroquia San Blas de Illescas, a Roman Catholic church.

== Gallery ==
Scenes around Coamo barrio-pueblo:

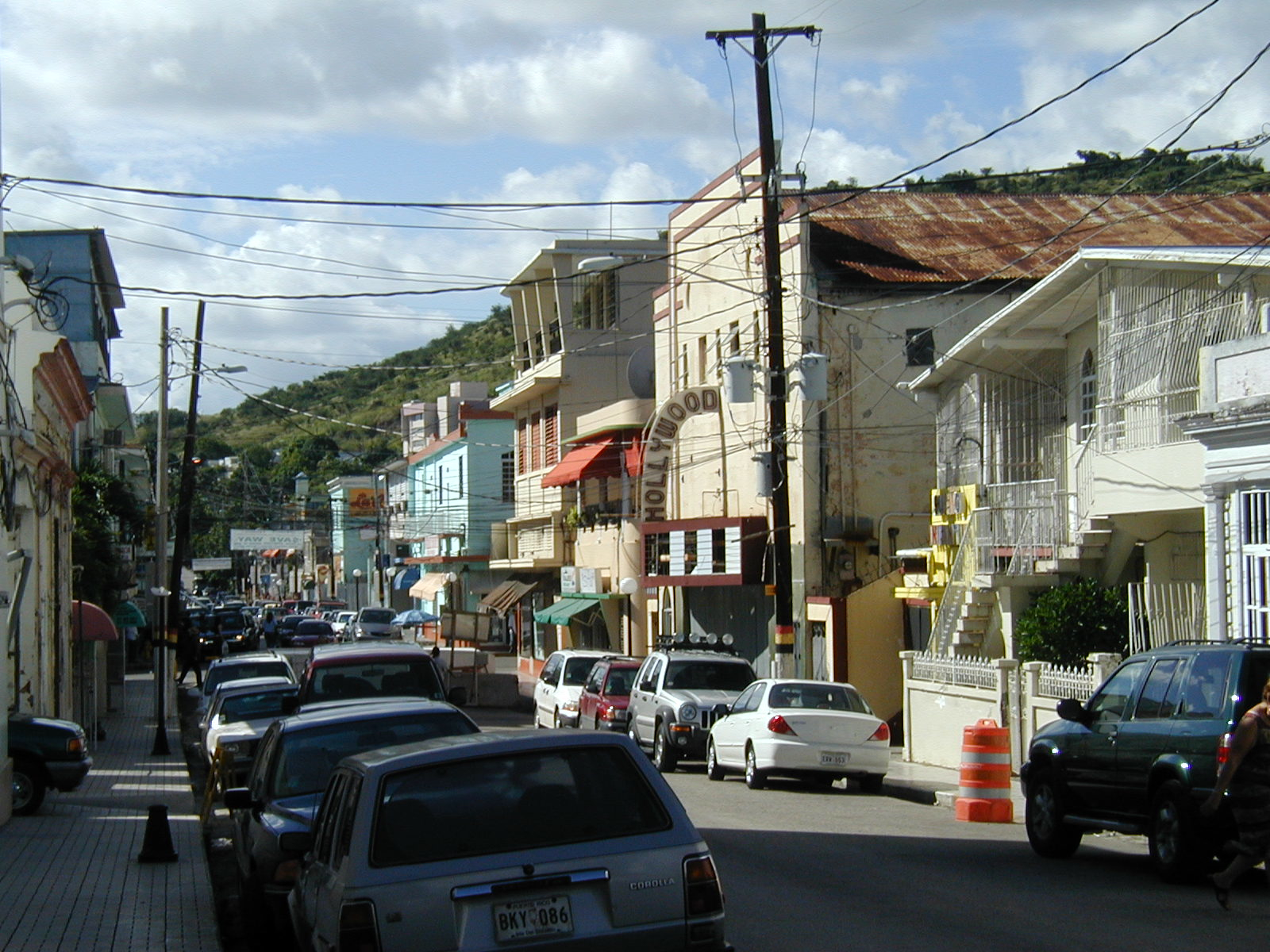
Street

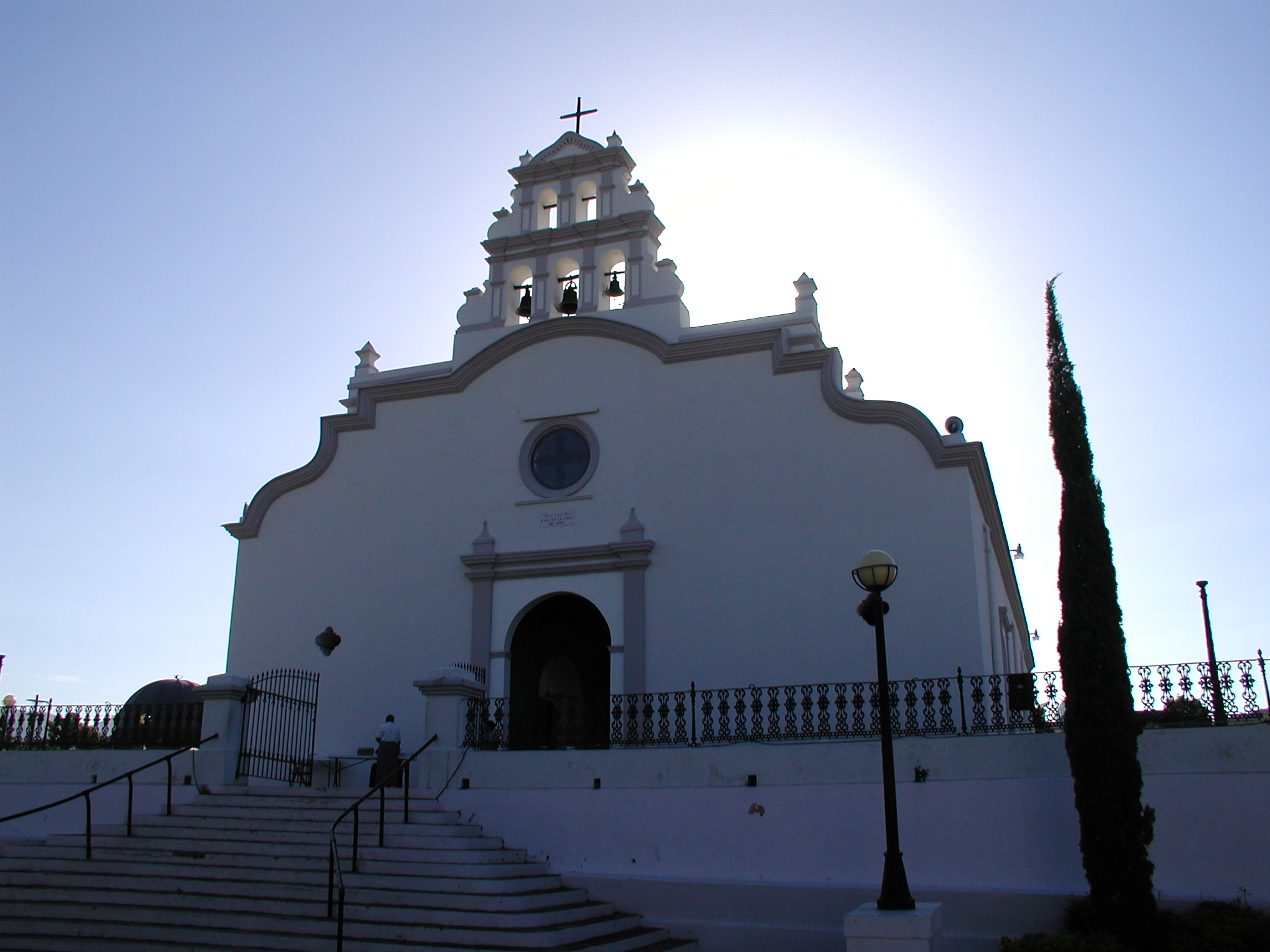
San Blas de Illescas Church

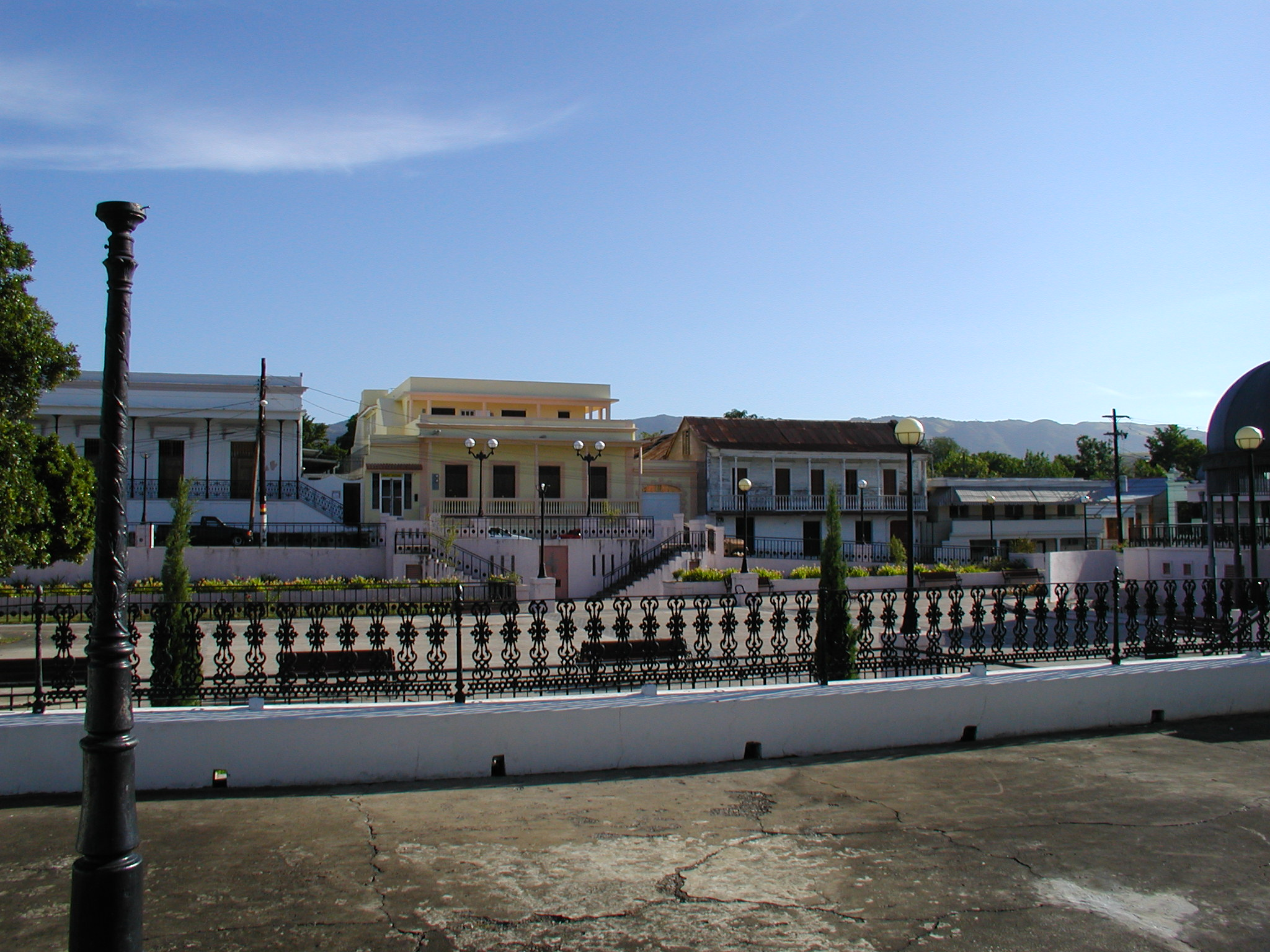
View of the main plaza or town square

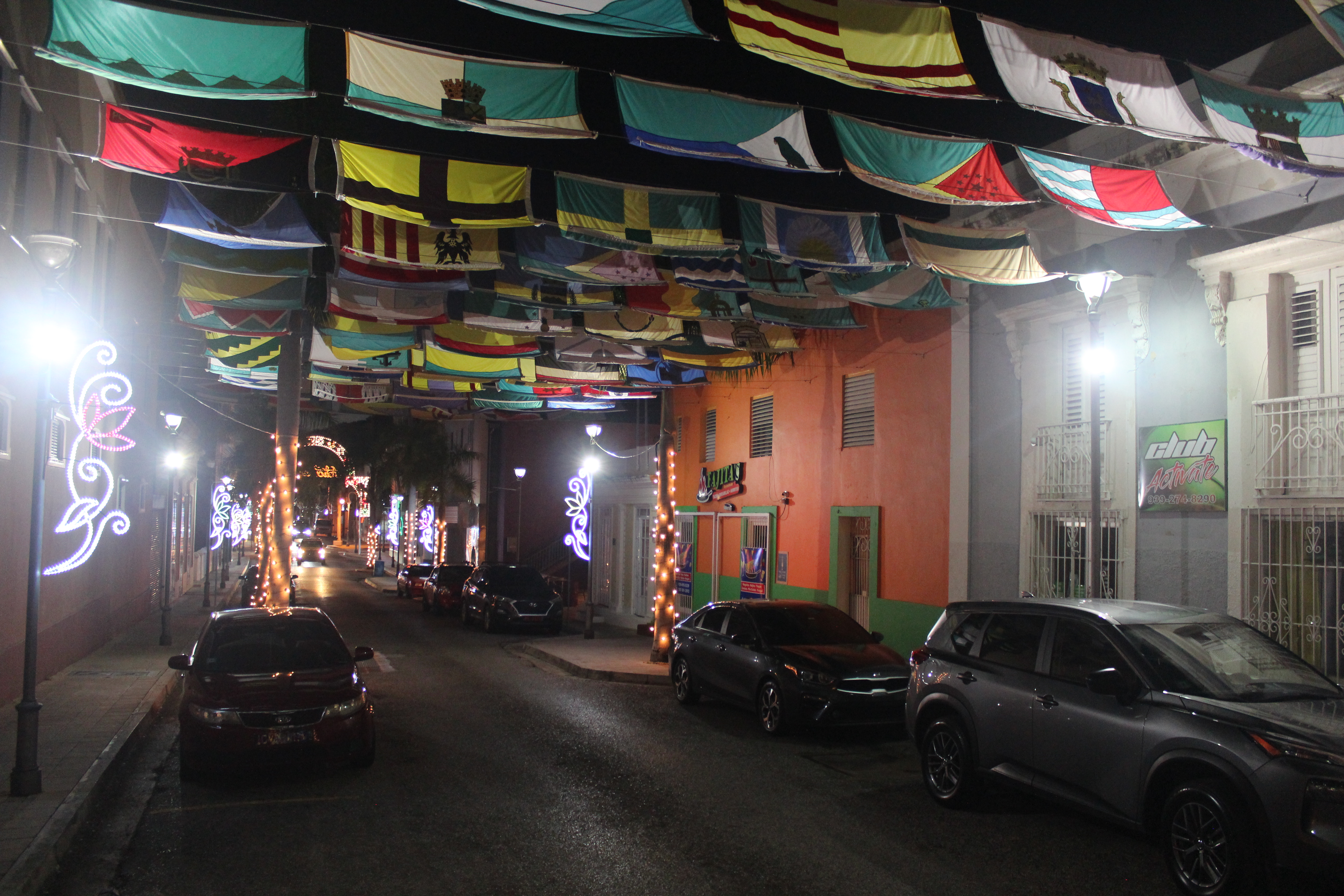
Baldorioty Street

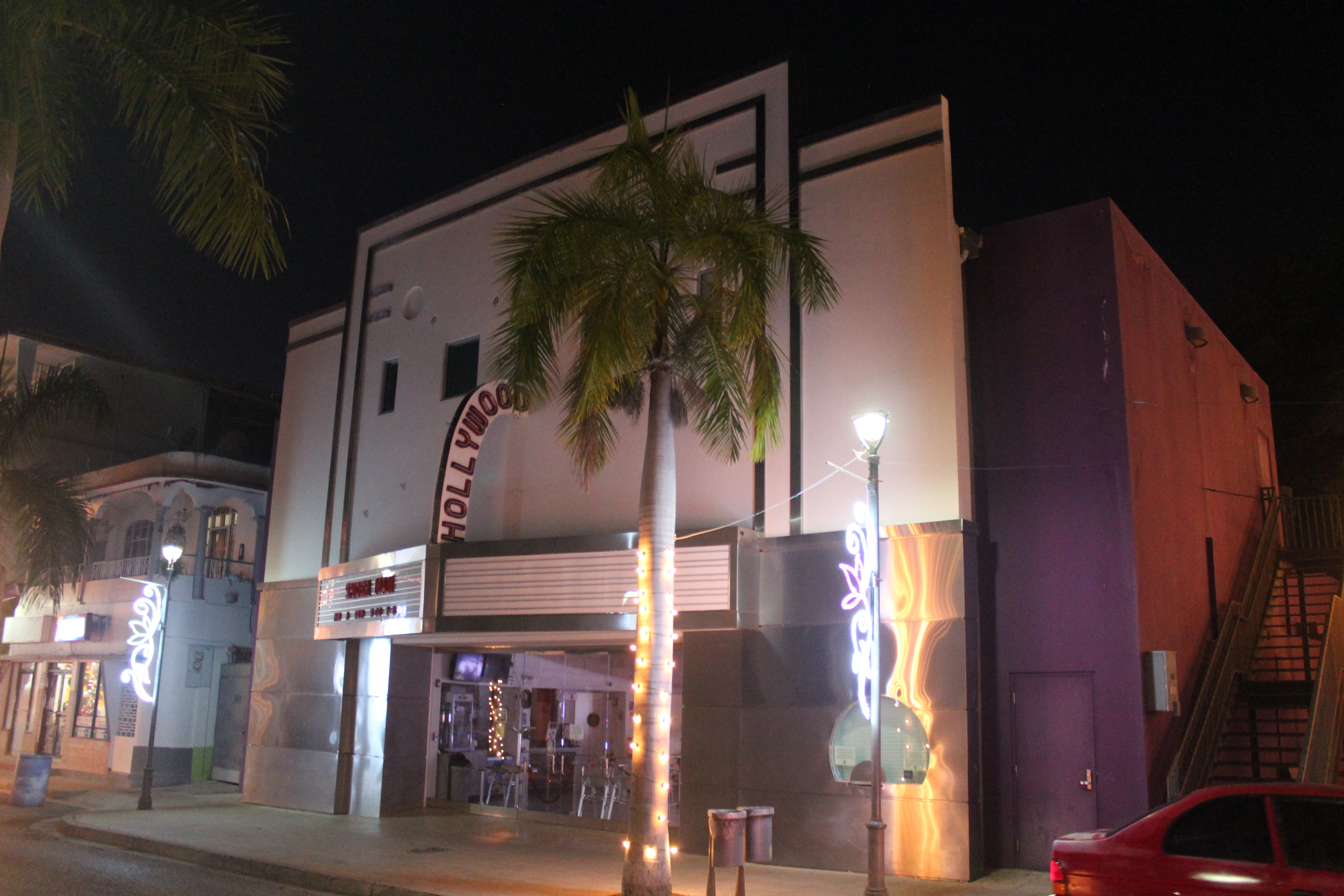
Hollywood Theater

== See also ==
- List of communities in Puerto Rico
