= Coamo Arriba, Coamo, Puerto Rico =

Barrio of Puerto Rico

Coamo Arriba
- Barrio
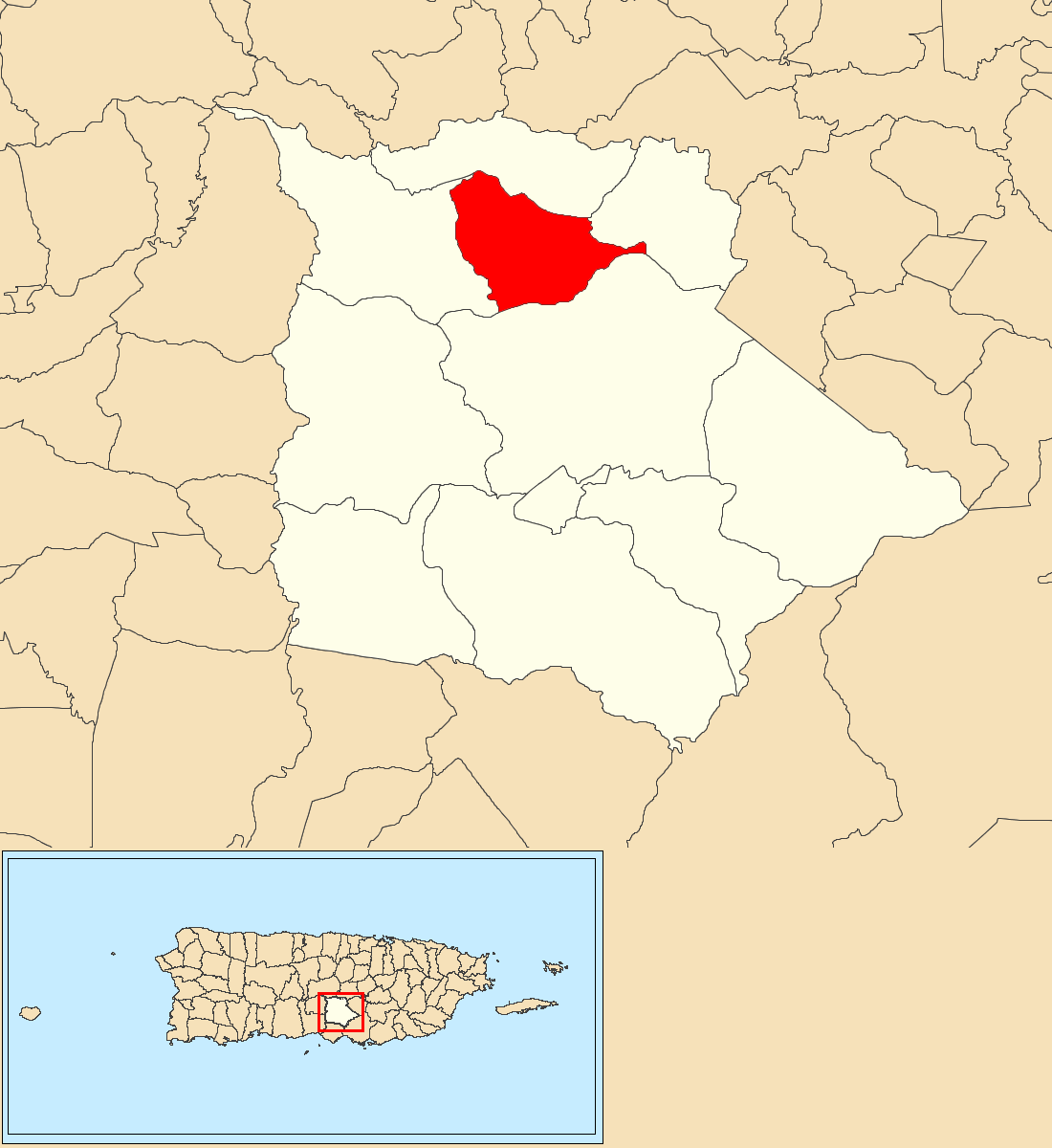
- Location of Coamo Arriba within the municipality of Coamo shown in red

- Location of Puerto Rico
- Coordinates: 18°08′30″N 66°22′03″W
- Commonwealth: Puerto Rico
- Municipality: Coamo

Area
  - Total: 3.85 sq mi (10.0 km^{2})
  - Land: 3.85 sq mi (10.0 km^{2})
  - Water: 0 sq mi (0 km^{2})
- Elevation: 1,220 ft (370 m)

Population (2010)
  - Total: 391
  - Density: 101.6/sq mi (39.2/km^{2})
- Source: 2010 Census
- Time zone: UTC−4 (AST)
- ZIP Code: 00769
- Area code: 787/939

Coamo Arriba is a barrio in the municipality of Coamo, Puerto Rico. Its population in 2010 was 391.

== History ==
Coamo Arriba was in Spain's gazetteers until Puerto Rico was ceded by Spain in the aftermath of the Spanish–American War under the terms of the Treaty of Paris of 1898 and became an unincorporated territory of the United States. In 1899, the United States Department of War conducted a census of Puerto Rico, and found that the population of Coamo Arriba barrio was 1,223.

Historical population
Census	Pop.	Note	%±
1900	1,223		—
1910	1,106		−9.6%
1920	1,219		10.2%
1930	966		−20.8%
1940	1,097		13.6%
1950	814		−25.8%
1960	603		−25.9%
1970	466		−22.7%
1980	459		−1.5%
1990	344		−25.1%
2000	422		22.7%
2010	391		−7.3%
U.S. Decennial Census; 1899 (shown as 1900) 1910-1930; 1930-1950 1980-2000 2010

== See also ==
- List of communities in Puerto Rico
