= Ermita Nuestra Señora de la Valvanera =

Historic church in Coamo, Puerto Rico

- Hermitage Church of Nuestra Señora de Valvanera of Coamo
- U.S. National Register of Historic Places
- Location within Puerto Rico
- Location: Intersection of José I. Quintón and Carrión Maduro Streets; Coamo, Puerto Rico
- Coordinates: 18°04′46″N 66°21′33″W
- Area: 0.6 acres (0.24 ha)
- Built: 1685
- NRHP reference No.: 86000700
- Added to NRHP: March 31, 1986

The Ermita Nuestra Señora de la Valvanera (English: Hermitage Church of Our Lady of Valvanera) is a historic church in Coamo, Puerto Rico. It was built in 1685 and added to the National Register of Historic Places in 1986.

The chapel is brick masonry and about 68 feet (21 m) by 34 feet (10 m).
