= Braulio Dueño Colón =

Puerto Rican musician

- Composed the "Canciones Escolares" (School Songs)

Background information
- Born: March 26, 1854; San Juan, Puerto Rico
- Died: April 4, 1934; Bayamón, Puerto Rico
- Occupation(s): Musician and composer

Braulio Dueño Colón (March 26, 1854 – April 4, 1934) was a Puerto Rican musician and composer.

== Early years ==
Dueño was born in San Juan, Puerto Rico. At a young age Dueño's father, who also loved music, taught him the basics of music and served as his inspiration. Dueño took music classes with "Maestro" Aruti, with whom he learned about composition and harmony. When an opera or zarzuela company visited Puerto Rico, they would hire a local orchestra to play their musical scores. When Dueño was a young man he would be hired to play the flute in many of these orchestras.

== Musical career ==
In 1879, he composed the music for the zarzuela "Los Baños de Coamo" ("The Baths of Coamo") which was originally written by Genaro de Arazamendi, in honor of the hot springs in the town by the same name.

Dueño participated in many literary-musical contests in the Ateneo Puertorriqueño. He won many prizes and honors for his compositions. Among the pieces honored were:

- La Amistad (Friendship, an overture), 1877;
- Sinfonía Dramática (Dramatic Symphony);
- Noche de Otoño (An Autumn Night), 1887;
- Estudio sobre la Danza Puertorriqueña (A Study of the Puerto Rican Danza), 1914.

However, it was the series of Canciones Escolares (School Songs, 1912), which were co-written with Virgilio Dávila and Manuel Fernández Juncos, that would give him lasting recognition as one of Puerto Rico's greatest composers. The Canciones Escolares not only won the highest honors in the Ateneo but was also acclaimed and honored at the Pan-American Exposition of 1901. The Canciones Escolares became an important part of Puerto Rican culture.

== Later years ==
Braulio Dueño Colón lived most of his life in the city of Bayamón, where he died on April 4, 1934. The city of Bayamón honored the memory of Braulio Dueño Colón by naming a school, a suburb and the municipal cemetery after him. He was buried at the Braulio Dueño Colón Municipal Cemetery.

== See also ==
- List of Puerto Ricans
