= Baños de Coamo =

Thermal springs in Coamo, Puerto Rico

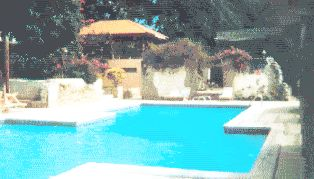
- Interactive map of Baños de Coamo
- Location: Coamo, Puerto Rico
- Coordinates: 18°02′16.00″N 66°22′26.03″W
- Type: Thermal spring

The Baños de Coamo (/ˈbɑːnjoʊs deɪ koʊˈɑːmoʊ/; the "Baths of Coamo" or "Coamo Thermal Baths"), located in the municipality of Coamo, are one of Puerto Rico's thermal springs.

Used by the Tainos in the pre-Columbian era, the Baños were believed by many to have healing powers. The Baños became a popular tourist attraction among the early Spanish settlers which prompted the construction of a resort by local entrepreneurs. Coamo was the site of an important battle during the Puerto Rico Campaign of the Spanish–American War and were subject to artillery bombardments which damaged the resort. The historic Baños and resort were restored during the 20th century by the Government of Puerto Rico, becoming once more a popular tourist attraction.

As of 2025, the place remains closed to tourists due to damage caused to the area's infrastructure, by Hurricane Maria in 2017.

== History of the "Baños" ==
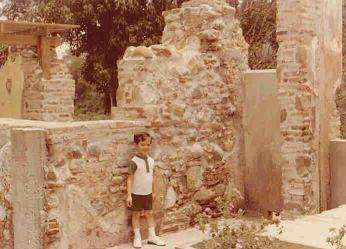
Damages caused to the Baños de Coamo by General James H. Wilson's artillery bombardment

The Taino's who inhabited Puerto Rico before the arrival of Christopher Columbus and the Spanish conquistadors were the first Europeans to discover the hot spring waters of Coamo. According to local legend, the first governor of Puerto Rico Juan Ponce de León, heard about the healing powers of the Baños from the Tainos. Believing that the baths were the Fountain of Youth which he was seeking, Ponce de Leon asked where they were located, however he misunderstood the instructions given to him and instead headed by sea towards a new land which resulted in the discovery of Florida and his death. During the mid-16th century the word spread among the Spanish settlers of the healing powers of the six sulfur-rich spring waters and as a consequence, many of the settlers began to make the regular journeys from San Juan to the mountainous region to enjoy what they believed were the benefits of said waters.

In 1847, Andrés G. Luhring, an entrepreneur from Ponce, built the first structures in "Los Baños". He built a guest house (hostel) made of wood in front of the baths to house the frequent visitors. He later had the main guest house built of stone and wood. Luhring had barriers placed around the baths which provided the visitors with privacy while bathing. Luhring lacked the necessary capital to continue operations and sold his interest in the same to a native Coameño, José Usera Soriano who in 1857 built an elegant 20-room hotel out of brick, rubble masonry and wood.

When the United States invaded Puerto Rico as a result of the Spanish–American War, the town of Coamo was involved in what is known as the Battle of Coamo during the Puerto Rico Campaign. Lieutenant Colonel Rafael Martinez-Illesas of the Spanish Army with 248 Spanish and Puerto Rican troops under his command held the Baños de Coamo. General James H. Wilson ordered the 3rd and 4th Regular Pennsylvania Artillery to provide artillery support for the frontal assault on the Baños, while Troop C covered the right side against flanking. The troops under Lt. Col. Martínez had already traveled eastward towards the town of Aibonito and only a handful of soldiers remained behind to delay the American advance. Troop C galloped at top speed north from the Baños de Coamo, after finding the resort abandoned by the Spanish. The damages caused by the artillery bombardment during the war are still visible today.

In 1879, Braulio Dueño Colon, a Puerto Rican musician and composer, composed the music for the Zarzuela (a Spanish lyric-dramatic genre that alternates between spoken and sung scenes, the latter incorporating operatic and popular song, as well as dance) "Los Baños de Coamo" which was originally written by Genaro de Arazamendi.

By the end 19th century and beginning of the 20th century, the springs gained international recognition. The resort that operated between 1847 and 1958 and which still had the hotel built by Usera Soriano in 1857, welcomed many notable visitors including Franklin D. Roosevelt, Frank Lloyd Wright, Alexander Graham Bell, and Thomas Edison. The Baños de Coamo resort closed its doors in 1959 and was in ruins and abandonment for many years.

In contemporary times, the springs continue to be marketed as a great place to visit.

Baños de Coamo was damaged by Hurricane Maria. Funds for repair were received by FEMA. Reconstruction of the hotel located there began in 2023 but stopped in 2024. In 2025, the community was requesting action on the tourist site.

== The Parador Program of Puerto Rico ==
In 1970 the Government of Puerto Rico established "El Programa de Paradores de Puerto Rico" (The Parador Program of Puerto Rico) under the jurisdiction of "La Compañía de Turismo de Puerto Rico" (The Puerto Rico Tourism Company). The Baños de Coamo were included in the program and modern structures were built. The new concept was officially inaugurated in 1978. What remains of the original 1857 hotel is the restaurant and some walls, among which there is a central wall structure which has been preserved and incorporated into a fountain courtyard on the grounds, adding to the historic ambiance of the modern Parador.

The Parador at the hot springs, is called "El Parador Baños de Coamo". The 48-room Parador, unlike a hotel, is small and cozy and has a swimming pool which has an access area to the hot springs. There is a pool which is supplied with the hot spring water with underground piping. There are multiple levels of baths, The top level is the hottest, this spills into a larger bath below which is cooler and then finally into a large pool which is coolest, but still warm. The pools are drained regularly for sanitation and cleaning. According to a study by the U.S. Geological Survey (USGS), daily discharge rates of the spring are between 32,000 and 83,000 gallons and the average water temperature is 43 degrees Celsius.

In 1995, the Puerto Rico Tourism Company sold both the Parador and an adjacent 24-acre (97,000 m^{2}) property, however in December 2001, the Supreme Court of Puerto Rico handed down a decision nullifying the sale and returned the Parador's ownership to the Tourism Co. Hector Torres Zayas, owner of the adjacent Coamo Springs Golf & Tennis Club, proposed to incorporated the Parador into his Coamo Springs resort hotel & spa project with an investment of $3 million in improvements to the Parador, which would include the restoration of its 48 rooms, the building of another 30 rooms, and the improvement of the recreational facilities. Even though Torres Zayas' Coamo Springs project was endorsed by the USGS, Coamo Mayor Juan Carlos Garcia, the Puerto Rico Tourism Co., the Puerto Rico Industrial Development Co., the Economic Development Bank, and the Department of Natural and Environmental Resources, the deal did not go through and the Parador was instead sold to Antonio Umpierre, its current owner.

== See also ==
- Coamo, Puerto Rico
- Military history of Puerto Rico
