= Cuyón River =

River of Puerto Rico

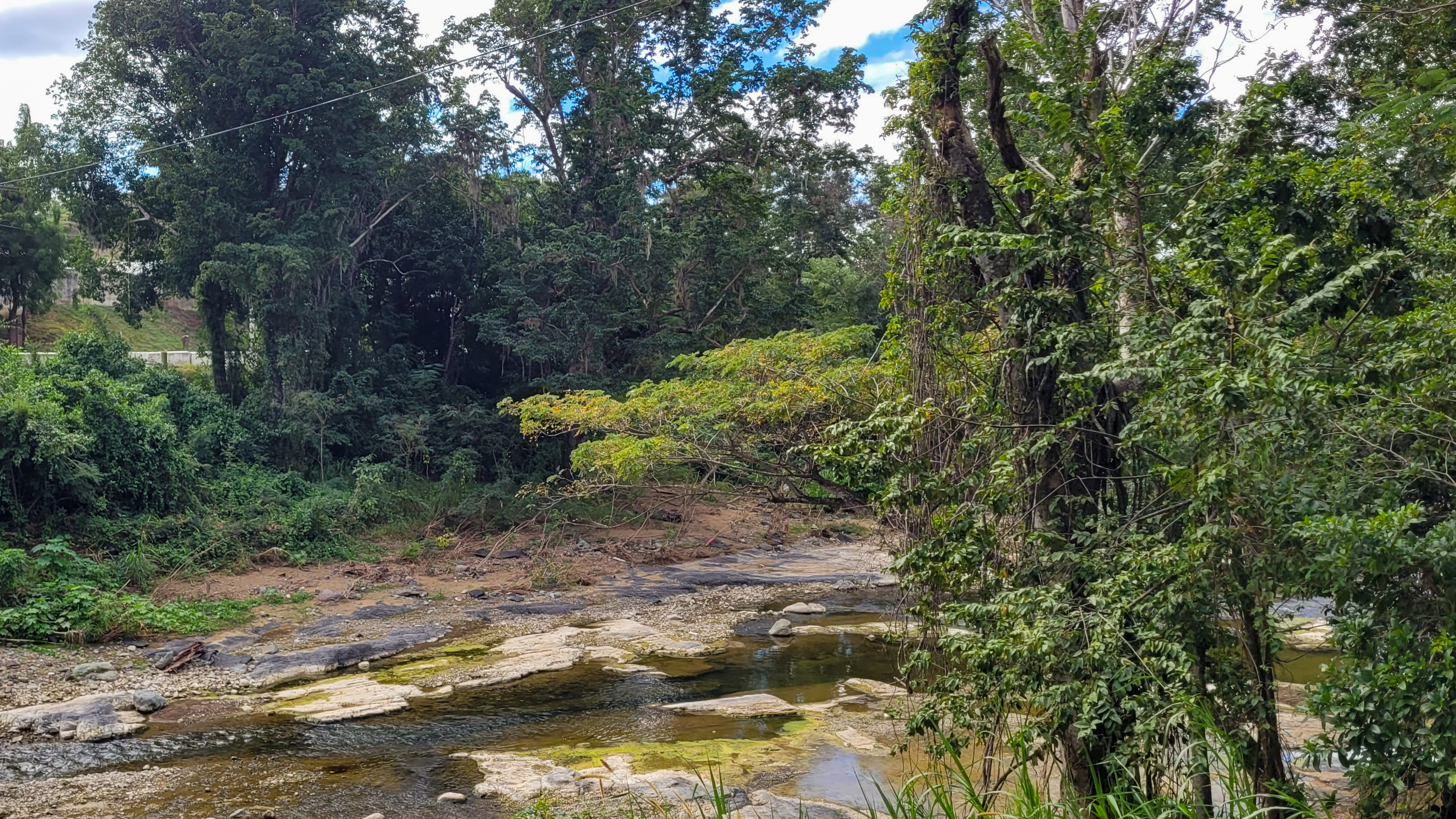
- Cuyón River seen from Puente de las Calabazas
- Native name: Río Cuyón (Spanish)

Location
- Commonwealth: Puerto Rico
- Municipality: Aibonito

Physical characteristics
- Source
  - coordinates: 18.0824616°N 66.3543361°W
  - elevation: 354 ft.

The Cuyón River (Spanish: Río Cuyón) is a river of Aibonito that also passes through Coamo in Puerto Rico.

== See also ==
- Puente de las Calabazas: NRHP-listed bridge near Coamo, Puerto Rico
- List of rivers of Puerto Rico
