= Puente de las Calabazas =

Historic bridge in Coamo municipality, Puerto Rico

- U.S. National Register of Historic Places
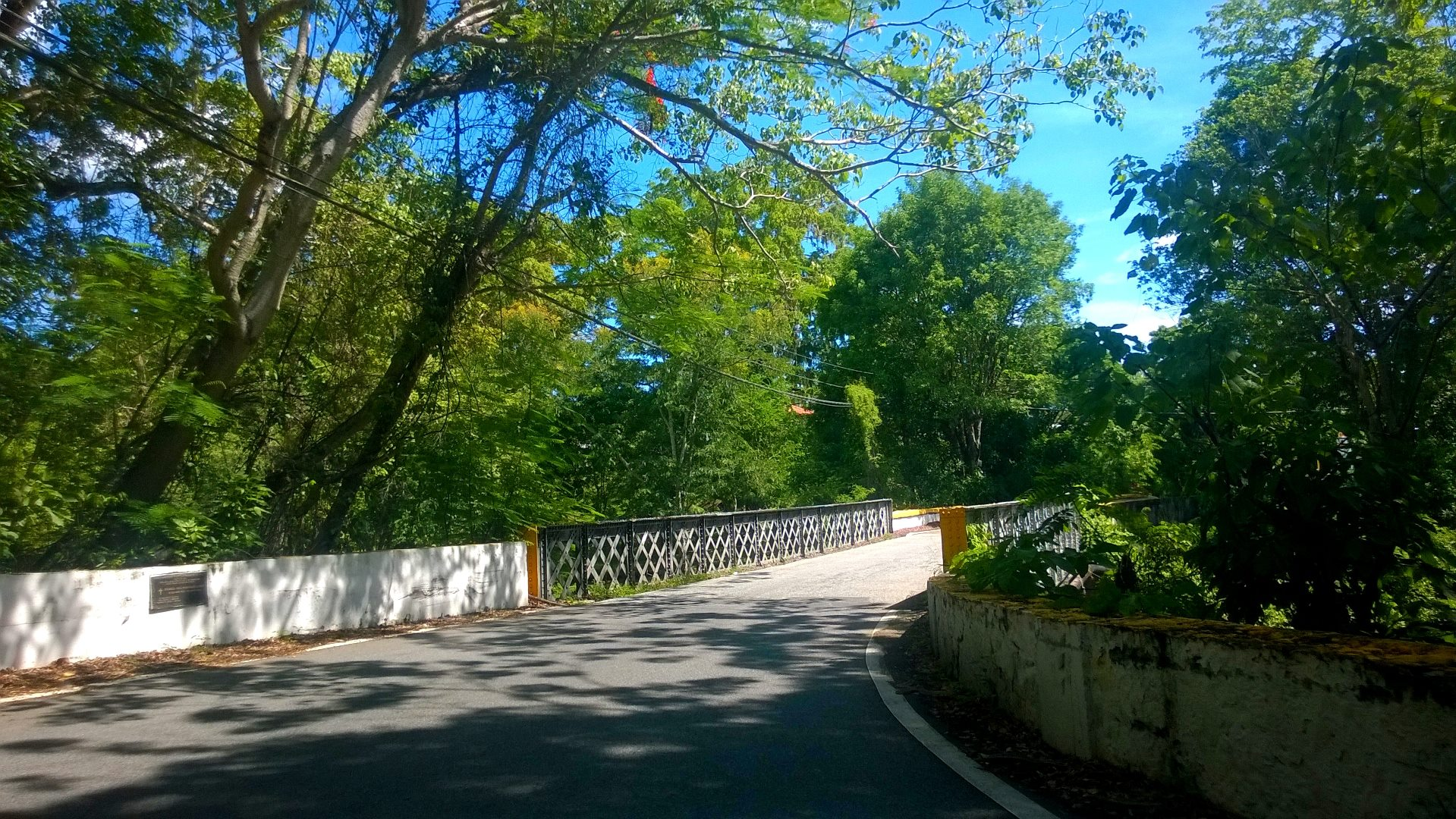
- Puente de las Calabazas (Ca. 2014)

- Location within Puerto Rico
- Nearest city: Coamo, Puerto Rico
- Coordinates: 18.088056°N 66.313333°W
- Built: 1882
- Architect: Eugene Rollin and Co.; Camprubí, Raimundo
- Architectural style: Lattice girder
- MPS: Historic Bridges of Puerto Rico MPS
- NRHP reference No.: 09000042
- Added to NRHP: February 17, 2009

Puente de las Calabazas is a single-span lattice girder bridge over the Cuyón River near Coamo, Puerto Rico on the Carreterra Central that dates from 1882. It was designed by Ricardo (or Raimundo?) Camprubi and was fabricated by Eugen Rollin and Co., a Belgian firm that exported via Spain from Braine le Comte, Belgium. Prolific engineer Camprubí designed several single span lattice bridges in Puerto Rico. He also designed the first two-span lattice girder bridge in Puerto Rico, the Padre Inigo Bridge (in Coamo, No. 174), which is also NRHP-listed. All of these were part of the Carretera Central.

It was listed on the U.S. National Register of Historic Places in 2009.
