= Coamo, Puerto Rico =

Town and municipality in Puerto Rico

Coamo Municipio Autónomo de Coamo
- Town and Municipality
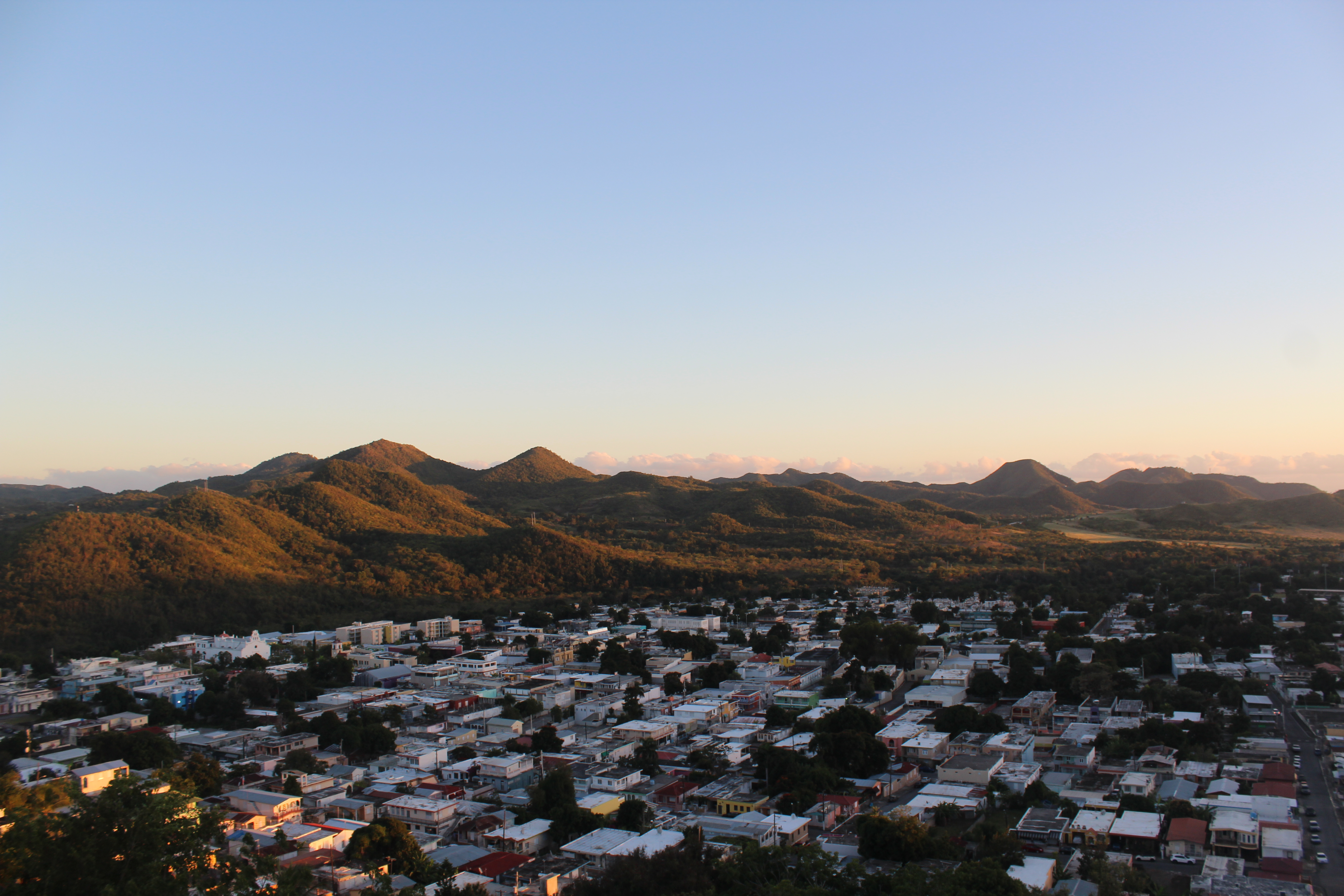
- Coamo from Cerro Picó

- Flag Coat of arms
- Nicknames: "La Villa de San Blás de Illescas", "Los Maratonistas", "La Villa Añeja", "Ciudad de las Aguas Termales"
- Anthem: "Allá muy cerca del pueblo"
- Map of Puerto Rico highlighting Coamo Municipality
- Coordinates: 18°04′48″N 66°21′29″W
- Sovereign state: United States
- Commonwealth: Puerto Rico
- Settled: early 16th century
- Founded: July 15, 1579
- Founder: Don Pedro de Aponte
- Barrios: 11 barrios: Coamo Arriba; Coamo barrio-pueblo; Cuyón; Hayales; Los Llanos; Palmarejo; Pasto; Pedro García; Pulguillas; San Ildefonso; Santa Catalina

Government
  - Mayor: Hon Juan Carlos García Padilla (PPD)
  - Senatorial dist.: Guayama
  - Representative dist.: 27

Area
  - Total: 78.05 sq mi (202.15 km^{2})
  - Land: 78.04 sq mi (202.13 km^{2})
  - Water: 6.6 sq mi (0,017 km^{2})
- Elevation: 486 ft (148 m)

Population (2020)
  - Total: 34,668
  - Estimate (2025): 33,076 ▼
  - Rank: 34th in Puerto Rico
  - Density: 444.22/sq mi (171.51/km^{2})
- Demonym: Coameños
- Time zone: UTC−4 (AST)
- ZIP Code: 00769
- Area code: 787/939
- Website: coamo.puertorico.pr

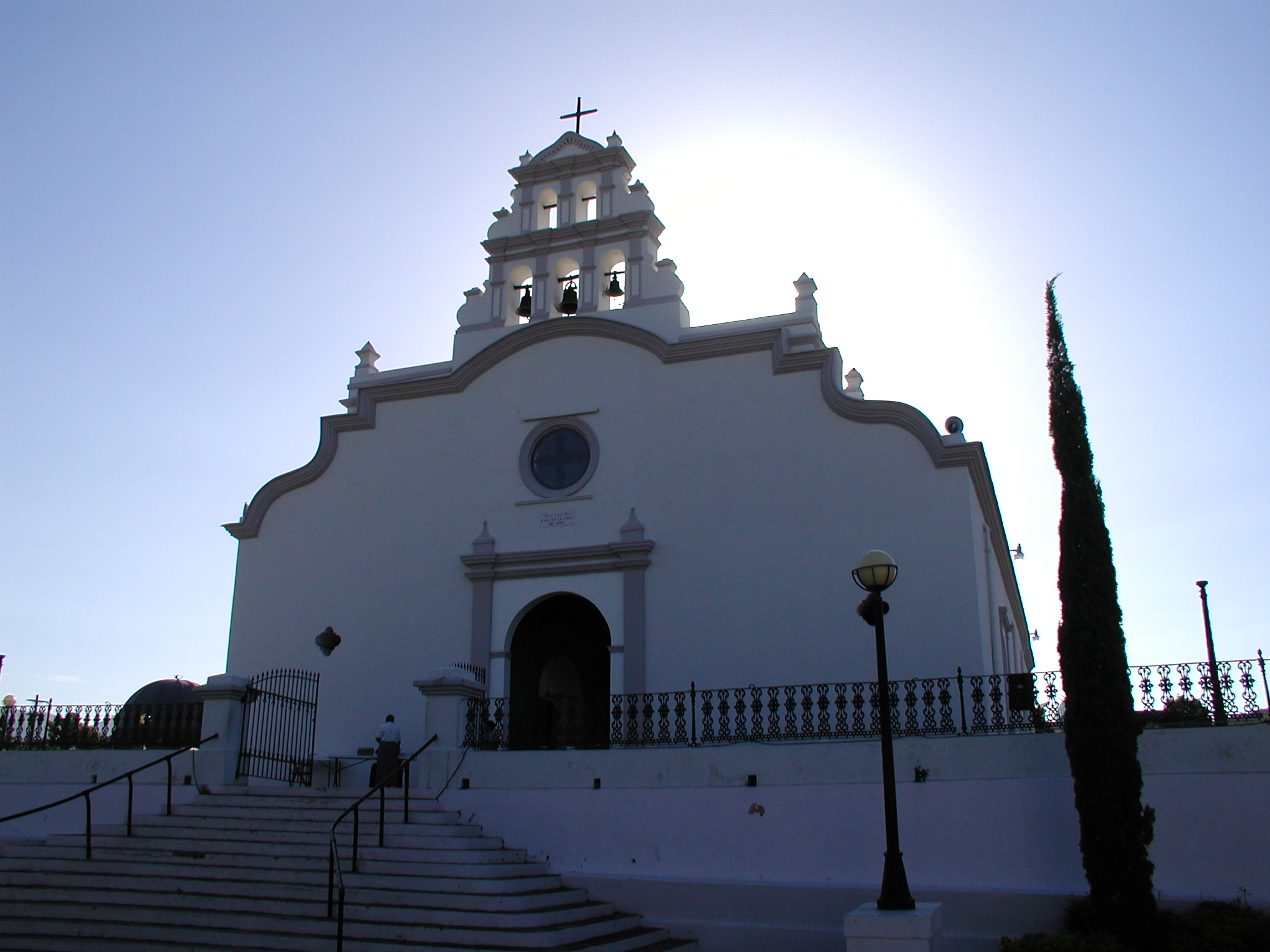
Church San Blas de Illescas of Coamo

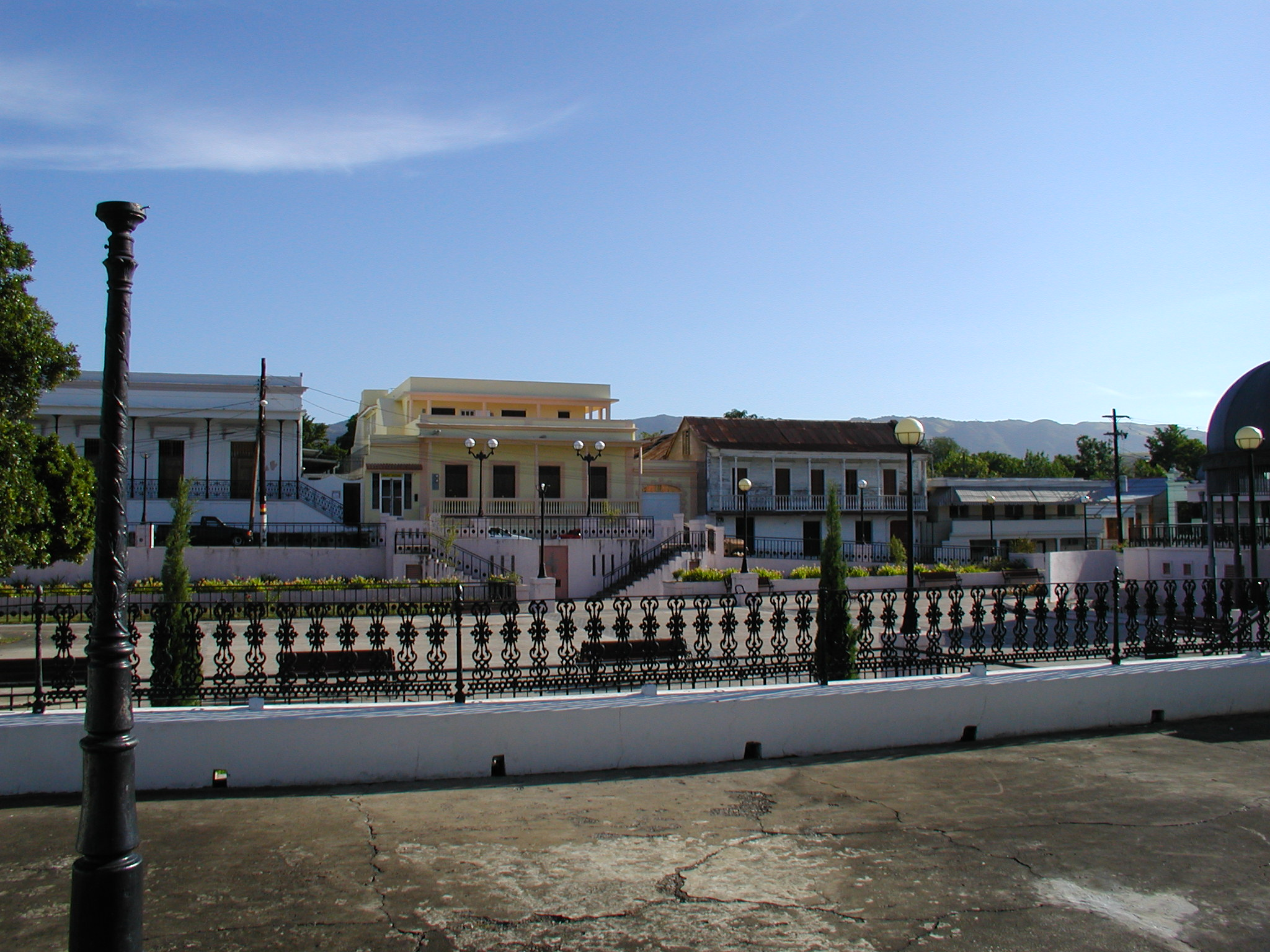
Downtown plaza area

Coamo (Spanish pronunciation: [koˈamo], locally [ˈkwamo]) is a town and municipality founded in 1579 in the south-central region of Puerto Rico, located north of Santa Isabel; south of Orocovis and Barranquitas; east of Villalba and Juana Díaz; and west of Aibonito and Salinas. The municipality of Coamo is spread over 10 barrios and Coamo Pueblo – the town or downtown area and administrative center of the city. The Coamo municipality is also a Micropolitan Statistical Area and as such is part of the Ponce-Yauco-Coamo Combined Statistical Area.

The town of Coamo and parts of its barrios are nestled in a valley about 20 miles (32 km) east of the town of Ponce (about 40 minutes by car). It was named San Blas Illescas de Coamo by Spanish settlers in 1579. Saint Blaise (San Blas) was designated by the Catholic Church as the patron saint of the town, and so it remains presently. Illescas is the Spanish town where some of the town founders originated (nowadays in Toledo province, Castile-La Mancha, Spain).

There are several theories regarding the origin of the word Coamo. One theory is that it comes from an indigenous word that means "valley". Another theory is that Coamo derives its name from Coamex (or Coamey), who was a celebrated local cacique. Archeological digs in the municipality of Coamo have produced extensive evidence of pre-Columbian inhabitants of the area.

Coamo is famous for its natural hot springs, Los Baños de Coamo, and for its annual San Blas Half Marathon. The Battle of Coamo was a decisive battle of the Spanish–American War (1898).

== History ==
When Spanish settlers arrived, Coamo was inhabited by the Taino. Modern archeology has found evidence of at least four pre-columbian villages in the territory that is today the Coamo municipality:

- "Buenos Aires" village was located in the current downtown southern section, were today is Buenos Aires Street
- "Baños de Coamo" village was located by the hot springs, across the river from the modern baths.
- "Cuyón" village was located in what is now Cuyón barrio
- "Las Flores" village was located west of the Las Flores neighborhood in San Ildefonso barrio. Artifacts found here suggest a high status cacique lived here.

It is believed the Coamo villages had strong ties with the coastal village "El Cayito" (in what is now Santa Isabel municipality) and the "Toíta" village (in what is now Cayey municipality) due to the large quantities of marine shellfish remains found in the Coamo and Cayey villages.

After the Taino rebellion of 1511 was defeated by the Spanish fuerzas españolas, the hard labor in encomiendas, epidemics of smallpox and other European diseases, and conversion to Catholicism and intermarriage with Spanish colonist contributed to the assimilation of the Taino into the Spanish society and culture.

Founded on July 15, 1579, the town of Coamo is the third-oldest settlement of the island's post-Columbian period (after San Juan in the north and San Germán in the west). At that time, Coamo was the administrative center for a larger area that would eventually be subdivided into several municipalities: Guayama, Cayey, Juana Díaz, Orocovis, Barranquitas, Cidra, Patillas, Aibonito, Santa Isabel, Salinas and Arroyo.

By 1582, there were twenty families living in Coamo, in the same area where the Tainos had had their village of Guayama. Coamo officially became a town in 1616, and was given the title of "Villa" by Spanish Royal Decree in 1778.

Coamo was the administrative center that encompassed most of the southern half of the island during the early colonial period. As the agricultural and sugar industries grew and became the mainstays of the colony's economy, the province would eventually subdivide into several distinct municipalities, and the administrative center of the region would later shift west to the coastal town of Ponce.

Coamo is the home of a series of natural hot springs, Los Baños de Coamo, which have attracted visitors since before the Spaniards landed. These springs were once rumored to have been Juan Ponce de León's legendary fountain of youth. In the early nineteenth century, a system of pools of varying depths, sizes and temperatures was constructed at the site of these springs to serve as a spa for the colonials. During the American invasion in the Spanish–American War (1898), this site was the scene of one of the decisive battles of that conflict (the Battle of Coamo). The American troops took possession of the island, and the spa was subsequently abandoned. Though the site lay in ruins for most of the twentieth century, it continued to be a landmark to the Coameños, who would often go to bathe in its healing thermal waters. The pools remain, but the old buildings which once hosted the island's affluent and colonial soldiers are gone, except for the remains of one central wall structure. It has been preserved and incorporated into a fountain courtyard on the grounds of a popular tourist hotel and rest area and has replaced the ancient Spanish ruins.

Puerto Rico was ceded by Spain in the aftermath of the Spanish–American War under the terms of the Treaty of Paris of 1898 and became a territory of the United States. In 1899, the United States Department of War conducted a census of Puerto Rico finding that the population of Coamo was 15,144.

Hurricane Maria on September 20, 2017 triggered numerous landslides in Coamo with the significant amount of rainfall. As of October 9, no one in Coamo had electrical service, only 15% of Coamo had access to clean drinking water, and several people on dialysis had died. Around 2,000 homes were partially or completely destroyed. The iconic Hotel Los Baños de Coamo was a total loss.

== Geography ==
Coamo is located in the South Central region of Puerto Rico. The highest point in the municipality of Coamo is an unnamed peak located at 3,248 feet (990 m) of elevation in the Ruta Panorámica on the municipal boundary with Orocovis, while the highest named mountain is Cerro Pulguillas at 2,739 feet (835 m) in the barrio Pulguillas.

=== Barrios ===
Like all municipalities of Puerto Rico, Coamo is subdivided into barrios. The municipal buildings, central square and large Catholic church are located in a small barrio referred to as "el pueblo", near the center of the municipality.

1. Coamo Arriba
2. Coamo barrio-pueblo
3. Cuyón
4. Hayales
5. Los Llanos
6. Palmarejo
7. Pasto
8. Pedro García
9. Pulguillas
10. San Ildefonso
11. Santa Catalina

=== Sectors ===
Barrios (which are like minor civil divisions) and subbarrios, are further subdivided into smaller areas called sectores (sectors in English). The types of sectores may vary, from normally sector to urbanización to reparto to barriada to residencial, among others.

=== Special Communities ===
Comunidades Especiales de Puerto Rico (Special Communities of Puerto Rico) are marginalized communities whose citizens are experiencing a certain amount of social exclusion. A map shows these communities occur in nearly every municipality of the commonwealth. Of the 742 places that were on the list in 2014, the following barrios, communities, sectors, or neighborhoods were in Coamo: Zambrana neighborhood, Cuyón, Sector Varsovia in El Cerro, Río Jueyes, and Sector Sabana Hoyo.

== Economy ==
=== Agriculture ===
Coamo is an agricultural center where mangoes, corn, guanabanas, tamarindo, quenepas, avocados, oranges and plantains are grown, and where poultry and cattle are raised.

=== Industry ===
Coamo is a trading center for machinery, aircraft radio components, and clothing.

== Tourism ==
To stimulate local tourism, the Puerto Rico Tourism Company launched the Voy Turistiendo ("I'm Touring") campaign, with a passport book and website. The Coamo page lists Aguas Termales de Coamo, Iglesia San Blas de Illescas, and Mirador Cerro Picó, as places of interest.

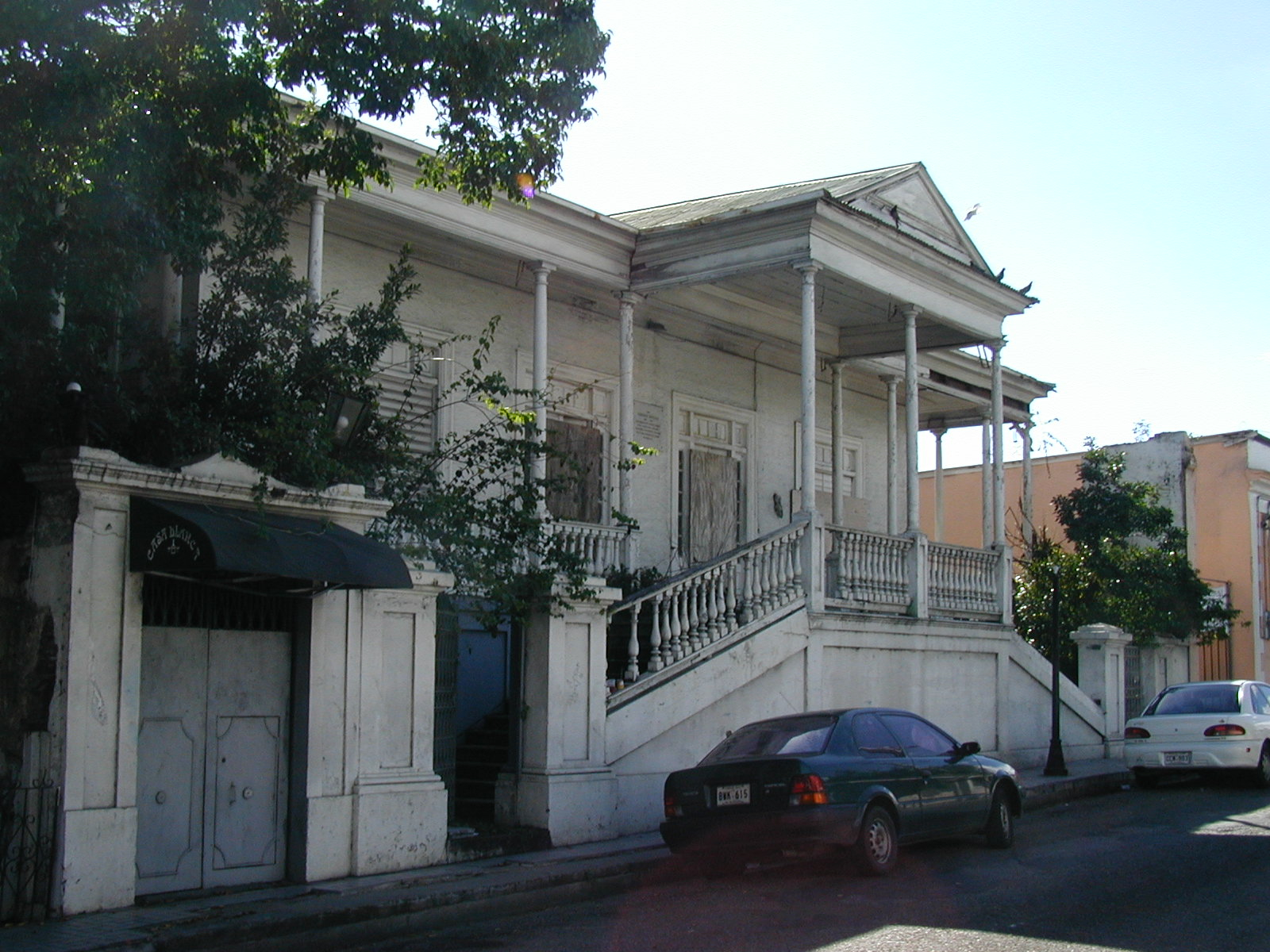
The house of Florencio Santiago, a philanthropist from Pasto, Coamo

=== Landmarks and places of interest ===
There are eight places in Coamo listed on the US National Register of Historic Places:

- Casa Blanca de Coamo
- Ermita Nuestra Señora de la Valvanera
- Iglesia San Blas de Illescas, construction on the church began in 1661 and it is one of the oldest parishes in Puerto Rico
- Puente de las Calabazas
- General Méndez Vigo Bridge
- Puente Padre Iñigo
- Picó Pomar Residence, now a museum
- Carretera Central, a highway that runs through several municipalities including Coamo

Some of the landmarks of Coamo are:

- Los Baños de Coamo (Coamo Thermal Baths) – near the border with Santa Isabel
- Puente de Las Flores

== Culture ==
=== Festivals and events ===
Coamo celebrates its patron saint festival in February. The Fiestas Patronales de San Blas Illescas y La Virgen Candelaria is a religious and cultural celebration that generally features parades, games, artisans, amusement rides, regional food, and live entertainment.

Other festivals and events celebrated in Coamo include:

- San Blas Half Marathon – February
- Crafts festival in honor of the municipal flag – June
- Coamo Anniversary – July
- Concert and lighting of the Christmas tree – December

=== Sports ===
Coamo is famous for being the host of the San Blas Half Marathon, a yearly world-class professional marathon that attracts the best competitive runners in the world. It was inaugurated in 1963 by Delta Phi Delta fraternity in honor to the founder of the town. World-class international and local runners compete in a 13.1094-mile (21.0975 km) half-marathon. It is Puerto Rico's biggest race, and the crowds are always large.

The Maratonistas de Coamo (from the BSN) is the only professional team which the town hosts. The team has played in Coamo with mixed success since joining the league in 1985.

== Demographics ==
Historical population
Census	Pop.	Note	%±
1900	15,144		—
1910	17,129		13.1%
1920	17,749		3.6%
1930	18,125		2.1%
1940	22,772		25.6%
1950	26,485		16.3%
1960	26,082		−1.5%
1970	26,468		1.5%
1980	30,822		16.5%
1990	33,837		9.8%
2000	37,597		11.1%
2010	40,512		7.8%
2020	34,668		−14.4%
2025 (est.)	33,076	▼	−4.6%
U.S. Decennial Census; 1899 (shown as 1900) 1910-1930; 1930-1950 1960-2000 2010 2020

Race - Coamo, Puerto Rico - 2000 Census
Race	Population	% of Total
White	30,264	80.5%
Black/African American	2,165	5.8%
American Indian and Alaska Native	101	0.3%
Asian	25	0.1%
Native Hawaiian/Pacific Islander	6	0.0%
Some other race	3,799	10.1%
Two or more races	1,237	3.3%

== Government ==
All municipalities in Puerto Rico are administered by a mayor, elected every four years. The current mayor of Coamo is Juan Carlos García Padilla, of the Popular Democratic Party (PPD). He was first elected at the 2000 general elections.

The city belongs to the Puerto Rico Senatorial district VI, which is represented by two Senators. In 2024, Rafael Santos Ortiz and Wilmer Reyes Berríos were elected as District Senators.

== Transportation ==
There are 31 bridges in Coamo.

== Education ==
Coamo's first school was built in 1901.

== Symbols ==
The municipio has an official flag and coat of arms.

=== Flag ===
The flag of Coamo derives its colors from the coat of arms. Its colors are red, yellow, and black.

=== Coat of arms ===
The top left and the lower right have a red background with a gold Episcopal hat each. These parts of the coat of arms represent the old seat of San Blas de Illescas. The horse and the bull represent the cattle wealth of the population. The gold color that serves as background in contrast with the black color, recalls the yellowish reddish tone of the fields of Coamo during the droughts. The heavy border of the coat of arms contains the following figures: two flames; three bell towers with gold bells outlined in red; two red crosses with arms ending in three petals; and a circle with a surface divided by horizontal blue and silver-plated stripes.

== Notable people ==
Some of its notable people include:

- Lely Burgos, Olympic athlete
- Bobby Capó, singer, composer
- Margarita Nolasco, senator and Vice-President of the Senate of Puerto Rico
- Antonio García Padilla, former President of the University of Puerto Rico
- Jose Garriga Pico, former senator
- Willie Rosario, musician, composer and bandleader of salsa music
- Alejandro García Padilla, Governor of Puerto Rico
- Víctor Caratini, Catcher for the Minnesota Twins

== Gallery ==
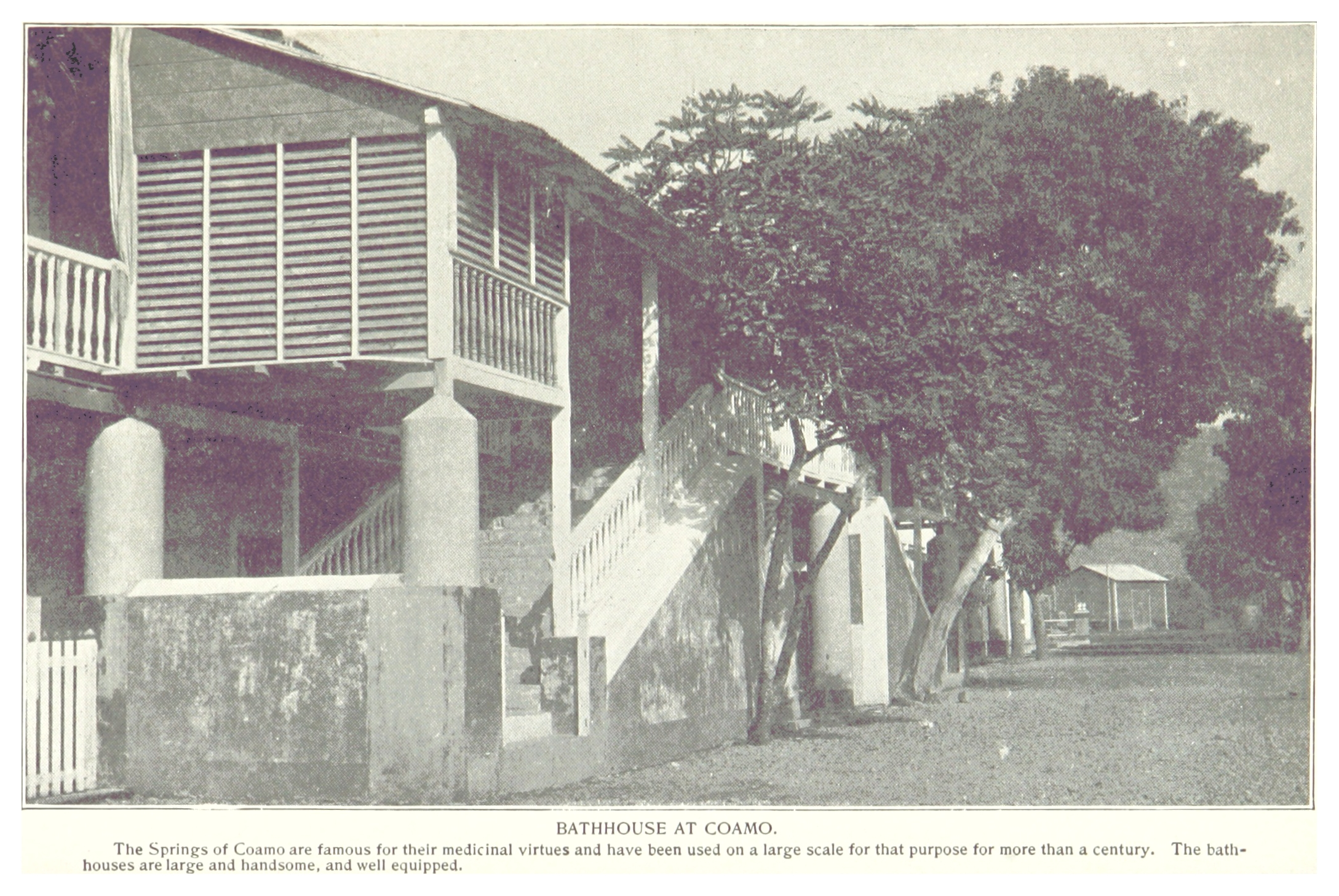
The Bathhouses at Coamo in 1899

== See also ==
- List of Puerto Ricans
- History of Puerto Rico
- Did you know-Puerto Rico?

== Sources ==
- Historia de Coamo, "La Villa Añeja", Ramon Rivera Bermúdez, 1980.
