= San Lorenzo barrio-pueblo =

Historical and administrative center (seat) of San Lorenzo, Puerto Rico

San Lorenzo barrio-pueblo Pueblo de San Lorenzo
- Municipality Seat
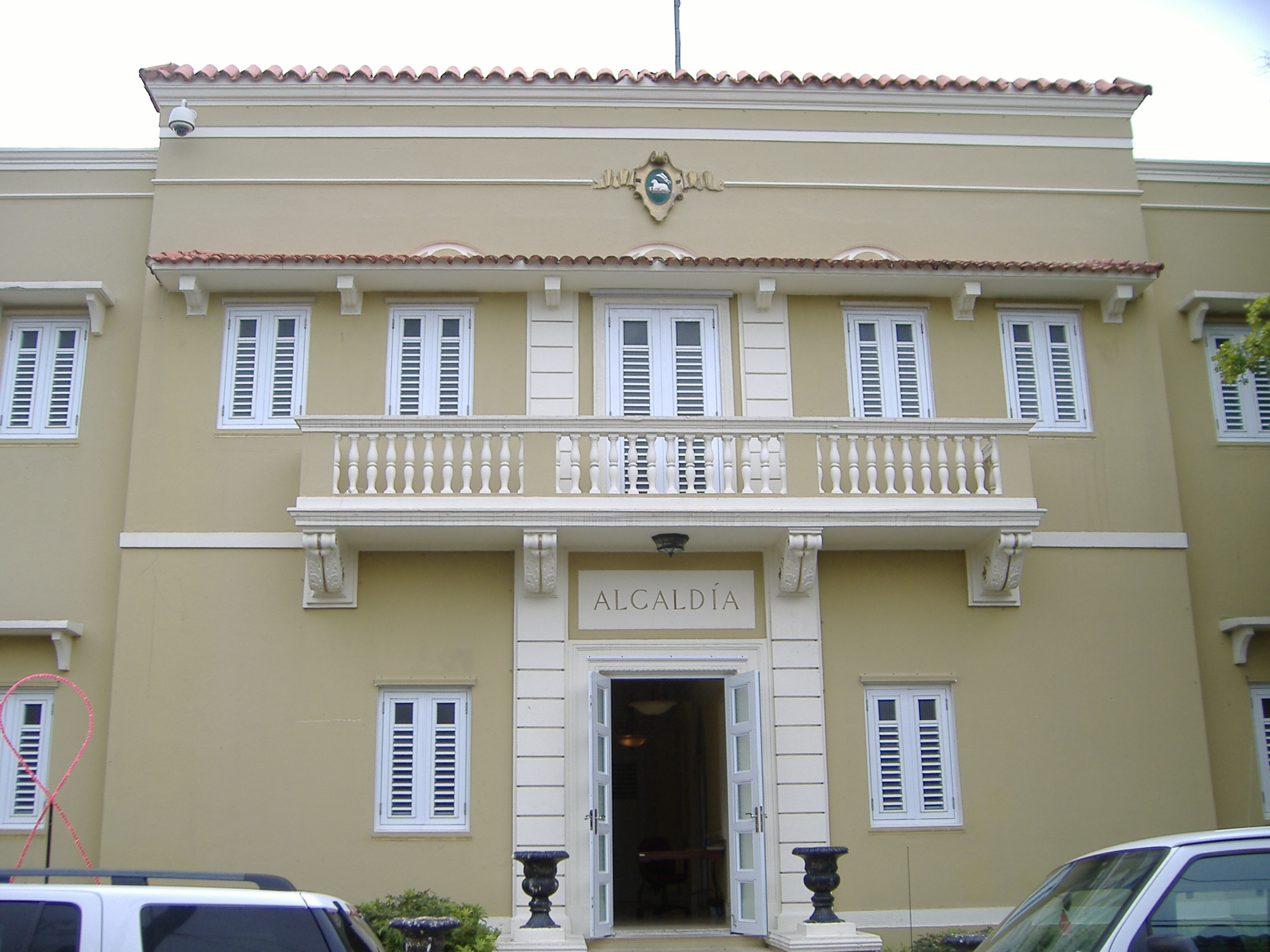
- Town Hall in San Lorenzo

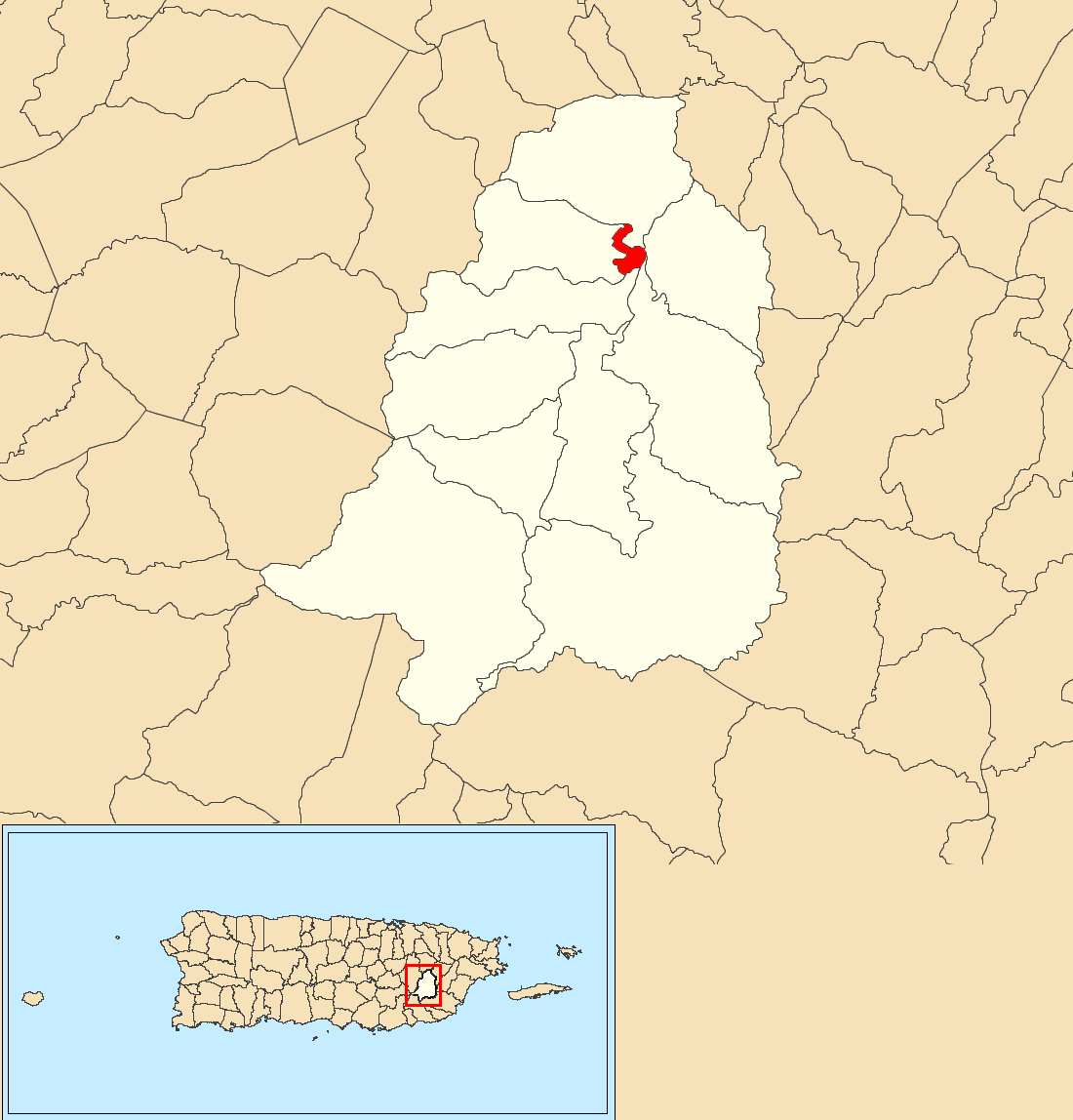
- Location of San Lorenzo barrio-pueblo within the municipality of San Lorenzo shown in red

- Location of Puerto Rico
- Coordinates: 18°11′28″N 65°57′47″W
- Commonwealth: Puerto Rico
- Municipality: San Lorenzo

Area
  - Total: 0.22 sq mi (0.57 km^{2})
  - Land: 0.22 sq mi (0.57 km^{2})
  - Water: 0 sq mi (0 km^{2})
- Elevation: 256 ft (78 m)

Population (2010)
  - Total: 2,045
  - Density: 9,738.1/sq mi (3,759.9/km^{2})
- Source: 2010 Census
- Time zone: UTC−4 (AST)
- ZIP Code: 00754
- Area code: 787/939

San Lorenzo barrio-pueblo is a barrio and the administrative center (seat) of San Lorenzo, a municipality of Puerto Rico. Its population in 2010 was 2,045.

As was customary in Spain, the municipality has a barrio called pueblo which contains a central plaza, the municipal buildings (city hall), and a Catholic church. Fiestas patronales (patron saint festivals) are held in the central plaza every year.

Historical population
Census	Pop.	Note	%±
1900	2,084		—
1910	2,663		27.8%
1920	3,662		37.5%
1930	4,916		34.2%
1940	5,181		5.4%
1950	6,745		30.2%
1960	5,551		−17.7%
1970	0		−100.0%
1980	5,963		—
1990	2,487		−58.3%
2000	2,490		0.1%
2010	2,045		−17.9%
U.S. Decennial Census; 1899 (shown as 1900) 1910-1930; 1930-1950 1980-2000 2010

== The central plaza and its church ==
The central plaza, or square, is a place for official and unofficial recreational events and a place where people can gather and socialize from dusk to dawn. The Laws of the Indies, Spanish law, which regulated life in Puerto Rico in the early 19th century, stated the plaza's purpose was for "the parties" (celebrations, festivities) (Spanish: a propósito para las fiestas), and that the square should be proportionally large enough for the number of neighbors (Spanish: grandeza proporcionada al número de vecinos). These Spanish regulations also stated that the streets nearby should be comfortable portals for passersby, protecting them from the elements: sun and rain.

Located across the central plaza in San Lorenzo barrio-pueblo is Nuestra Señora de las Mercedes de San Miguel de Hato Grande, the NRHP-listed Roman Catholic parish church. Another local landmark is the Machín–Ramos Residence, one of the oldest houses in the region and a historic monument.

== History ==
San Lorenzo barrio-pueblo was in Spain's gazetteers until Puerto Rico was ceded by Spain in the aftermath of the Spanish–American War under the terms of the Treaty of Paris of 1898 and became an unincorporated territory of the United States. In 1899, the United States Department of War conducted a census of Puerto Rico finding that the population of San Lorenzo Pueblo was 2,084.

== Sectors ==
Barrios (which are, in contemporary times, roughly comparable to minor civil divisions) in turn are further subdivided into smaller local populated place areas/units called sectores (sectors in English). The types of sectores may vary, from normally sector to urbanización to reparto to barriada to residencial, among others.

The following sectors are in San Lorenzo barrio-pueblo:

Calle Celso Barbosa, Calle Colón, Calle Condado, Calle Delicias, Calle Dr. Veve Calzada, Calle El Edén, Calle Emilio Buitrago, Calle Federico Sellés, Calle José de Diego, Calle Julia Vázquez, Calle Méndez Álvarez, Calle Muñoz Rivera, Calle Nueva, Calle Policarpio Santana, Calle Ramón Alcalá, Calle Sánchez López, Calle Santiago Iglesias Pantín, Calle Soto, Calle Tomás Delgado, Calle Tous Soto, Calle Valeriano Muñoz, España, Residencial Hato Grande, Reparto Medina, Sector Aril, Sector Asia, Urbanización Las Mercedes, Urbanización Massó, Urbanización San Miguel, and Urbanización y Extensión Jardines de San Lorenzo.

== Gallery ==
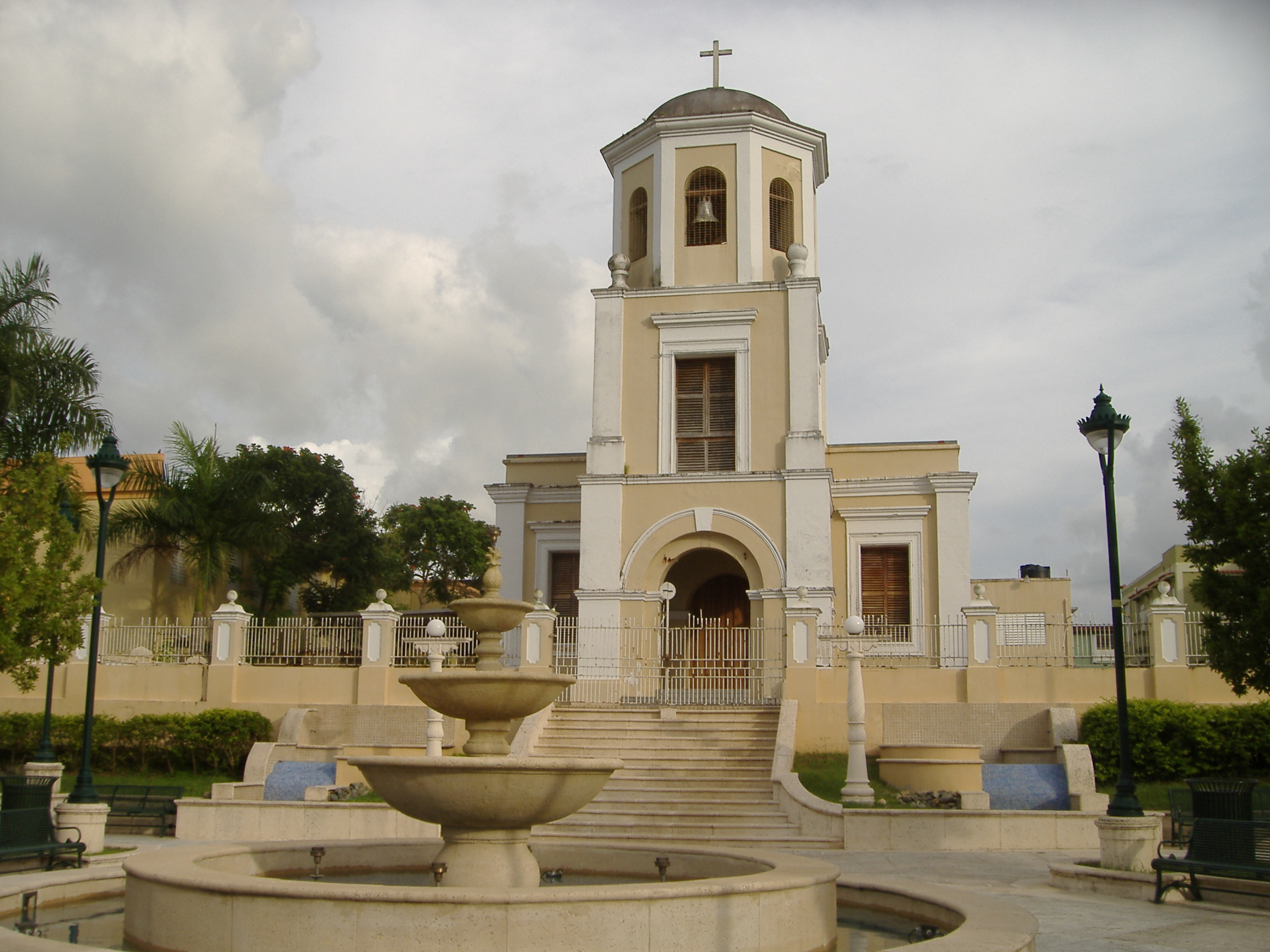
Nuestra Señora de las Mercedes de San Miguel de Hato Grande

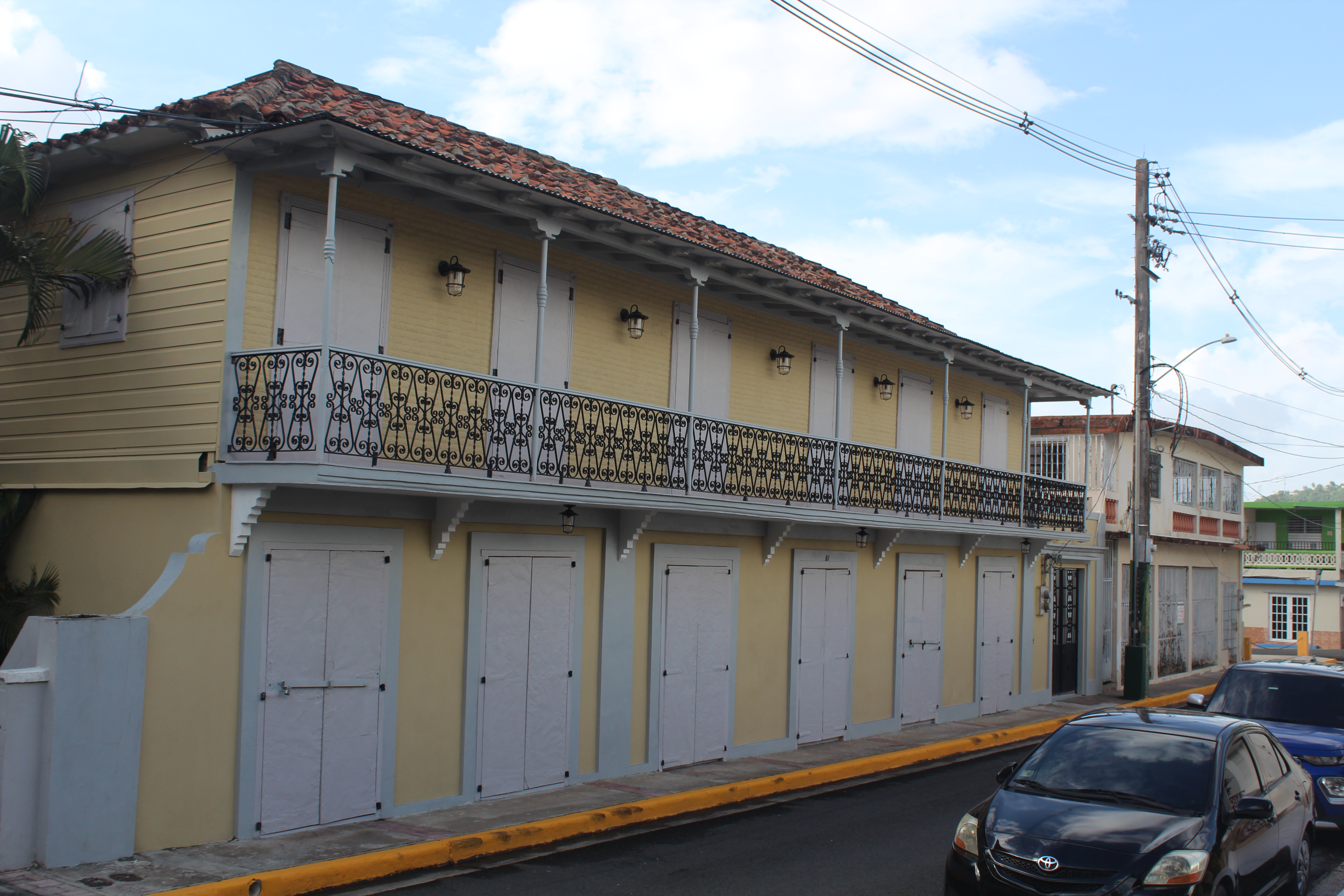
Residencia Machín–Ramos

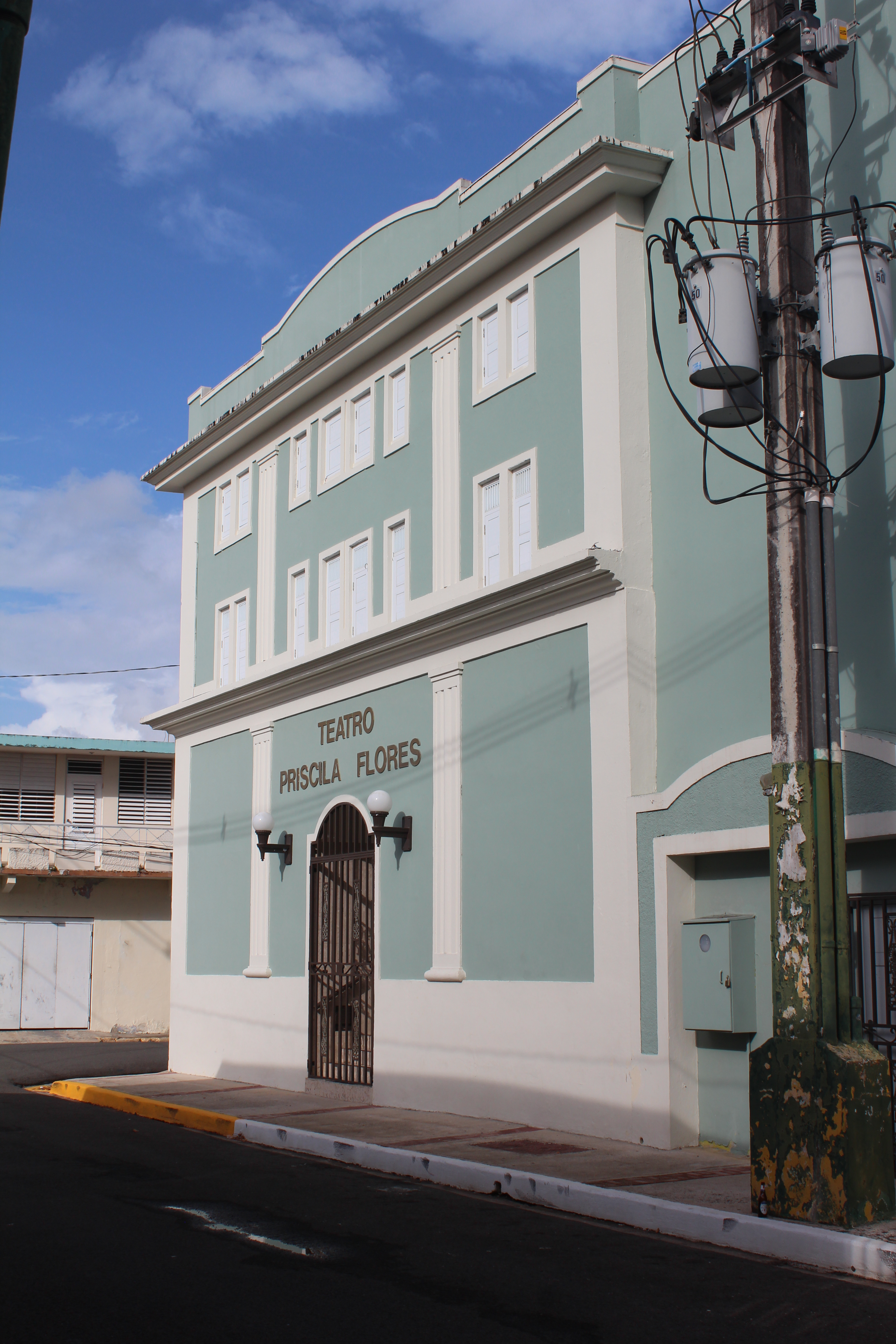
Teatro Priscila Flores

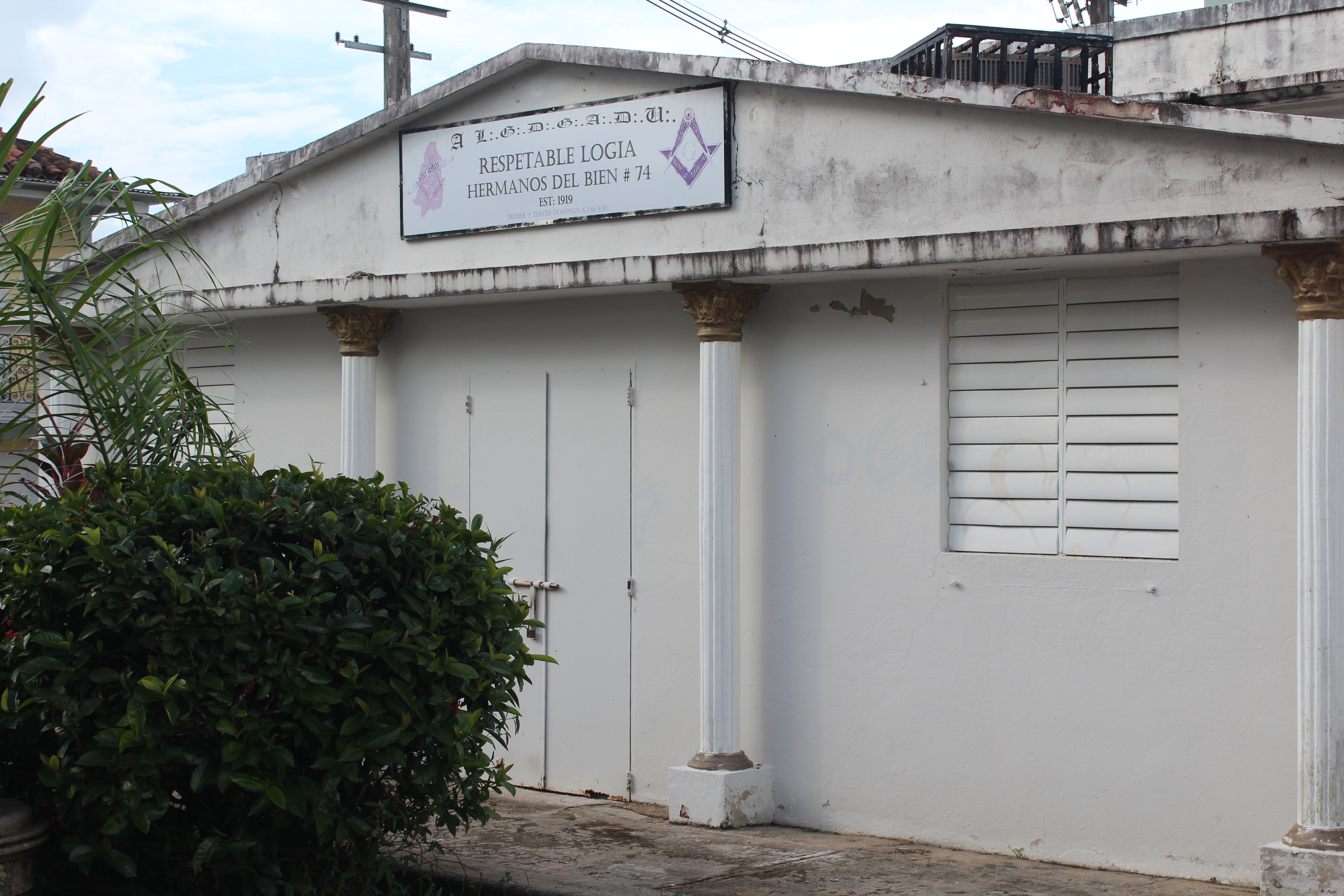
Masonic lodge across the plaza.

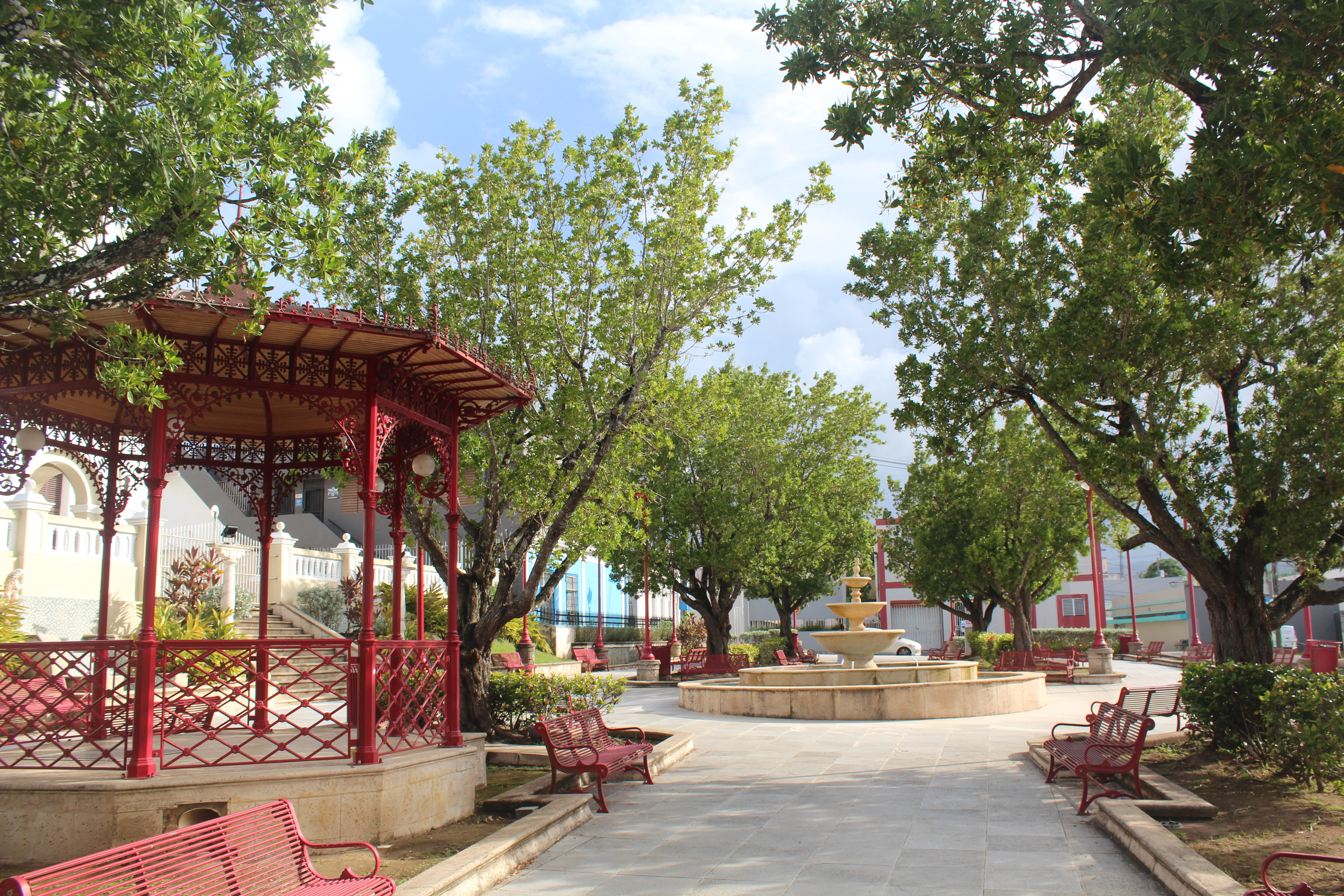
San Lorenzo town square (plaza pública)

== See also ==
- List of communities in Puerto Rico
- List of barrios and sectors of San Lorenzo, Puerto Rico
