= Residencia Machín–Ramos =

- U.S. National Register of Historic Places
- Puerto Rico Historic Sites and Zones
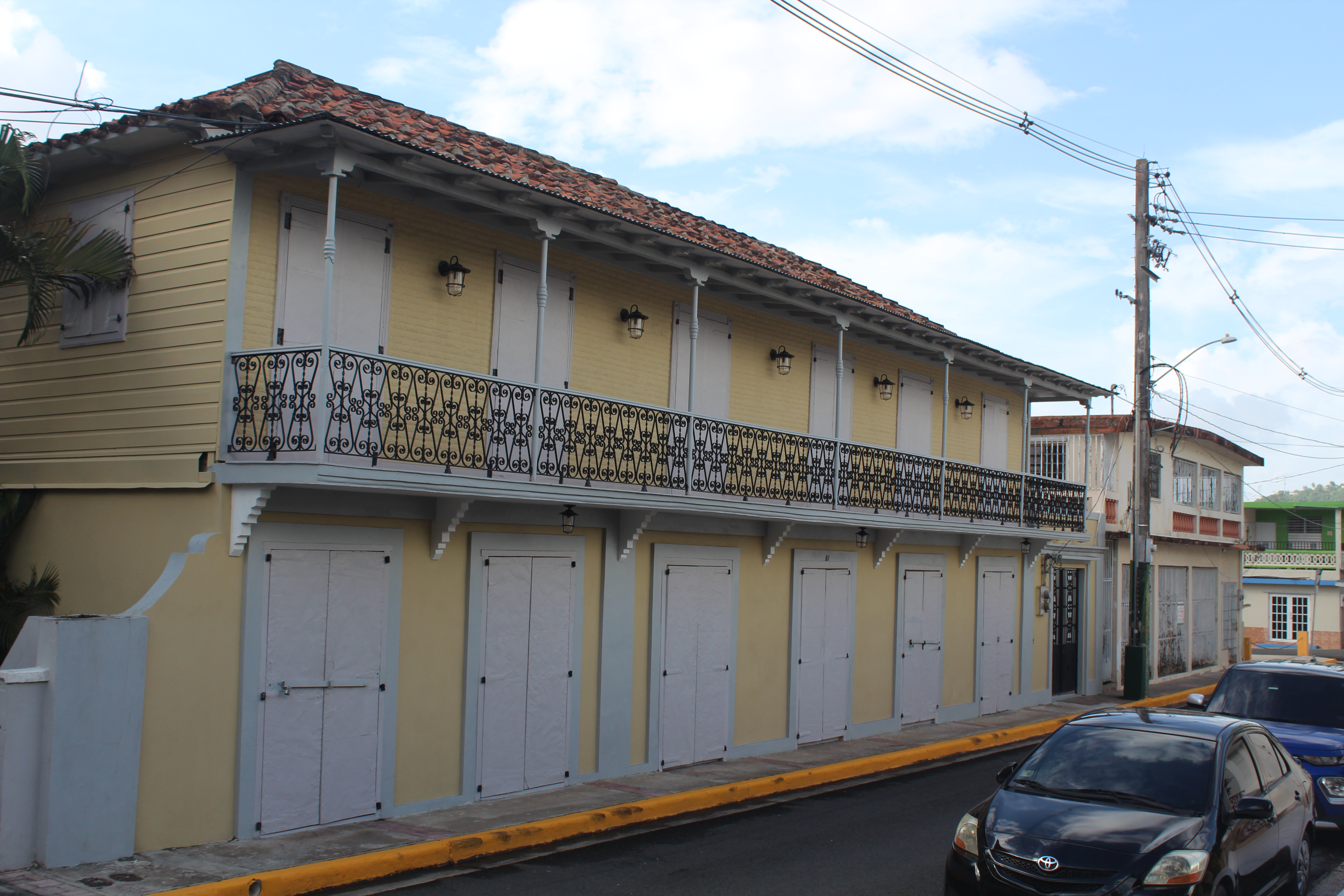
- Machín–Ramos house in 2023.

- Location within Puerto Rico
- Location: Eugenio Sánchez López Street in front of the public plaza of San Lorenzo, Puerto Rico
- Coordinates: 18°11′27″N 65°57′40″W
- Built: 1883
- Architectural style: Spanish Colonial vernacular
- NRHP reference No.: 88001180
- RNSZH No.: 2000-(RCE)-21-JP-SH

Significant dates
- Added to NRHP: May 5, 1989
- Designated RNSZH: December 21, 2000

The Machín–Ramos Residence (Spanish: Residencia Machín–Ramos) is a historic late 19th-century house located in San Lorenzo Pueblo, the administrative and historic center of the municipality of San Lorenzo, Puerto Rico. The building is the best example of 19th-century Spanish Creole vernacular architecture in San Lorenzo and a good example of this style of architecture in Puerto Rico, with well-preserved examples of this type of building becoming rarer throughout the island in the 20th century.

Although the exact date of construction is not officially known, it is very possible based on urban plans that the building existed before 1883, the oldest written documentation of its existence in the form of property titles. The first known owner of the building was Don Pedro Machín y Flores and his wife Cándida Rosa Machín y Parrilla, the former being the daughter of San Lorenzo mayor Don José Machín y Alonso. The Machín family originated from the island of Fuerteventura in the Canary Islands, relating to the Isleño or Canarian vernacular architectural style that inspired this type of residence throughout 18th and 19th-century Puerto Rico.

The house has been declared a historical monument by the Institute of Puerto Rican Culture (ICP) and has been listed in the United States National Register of Historic Places since 1989. Today it functions as a house museum and as the headquarters of the Municipal Department of Art, Culture and Tourism of San Lorenzo (Departamento de Arte, Cultura y Turismo de San Lorenzo).

== Gallery ==
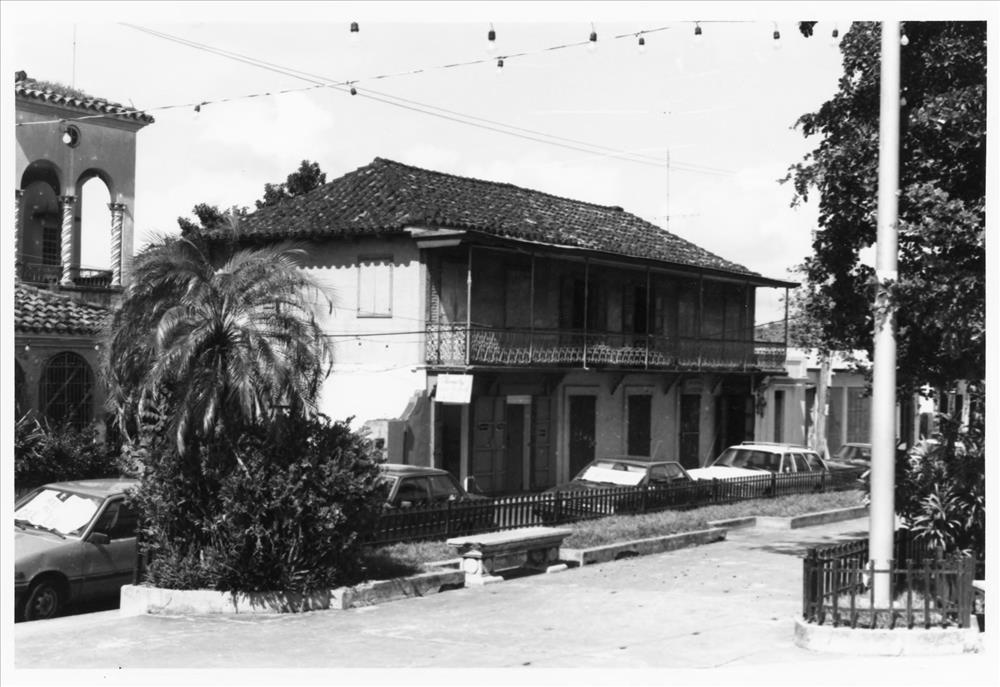
The house in 1988.

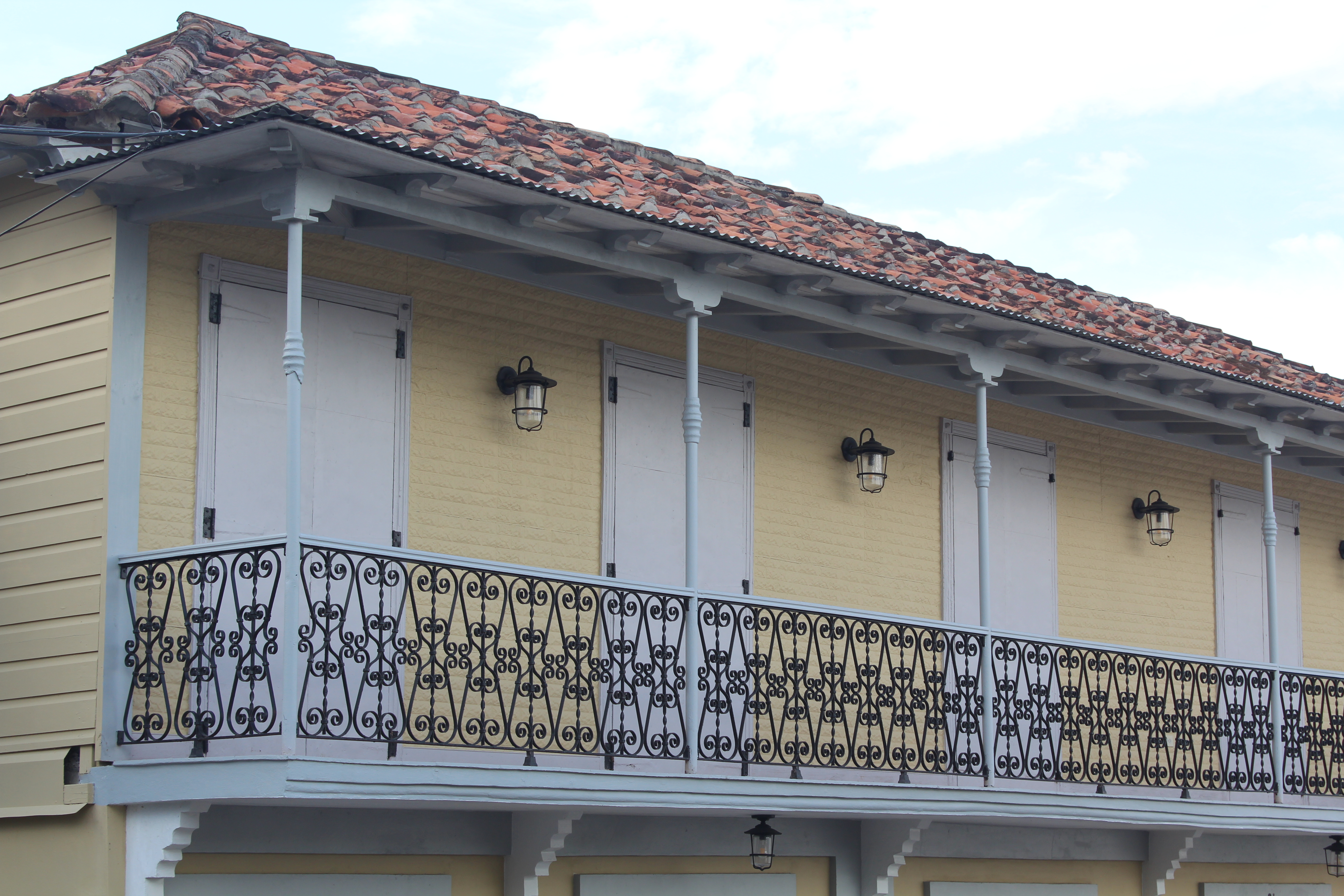
House balcony in 2023.

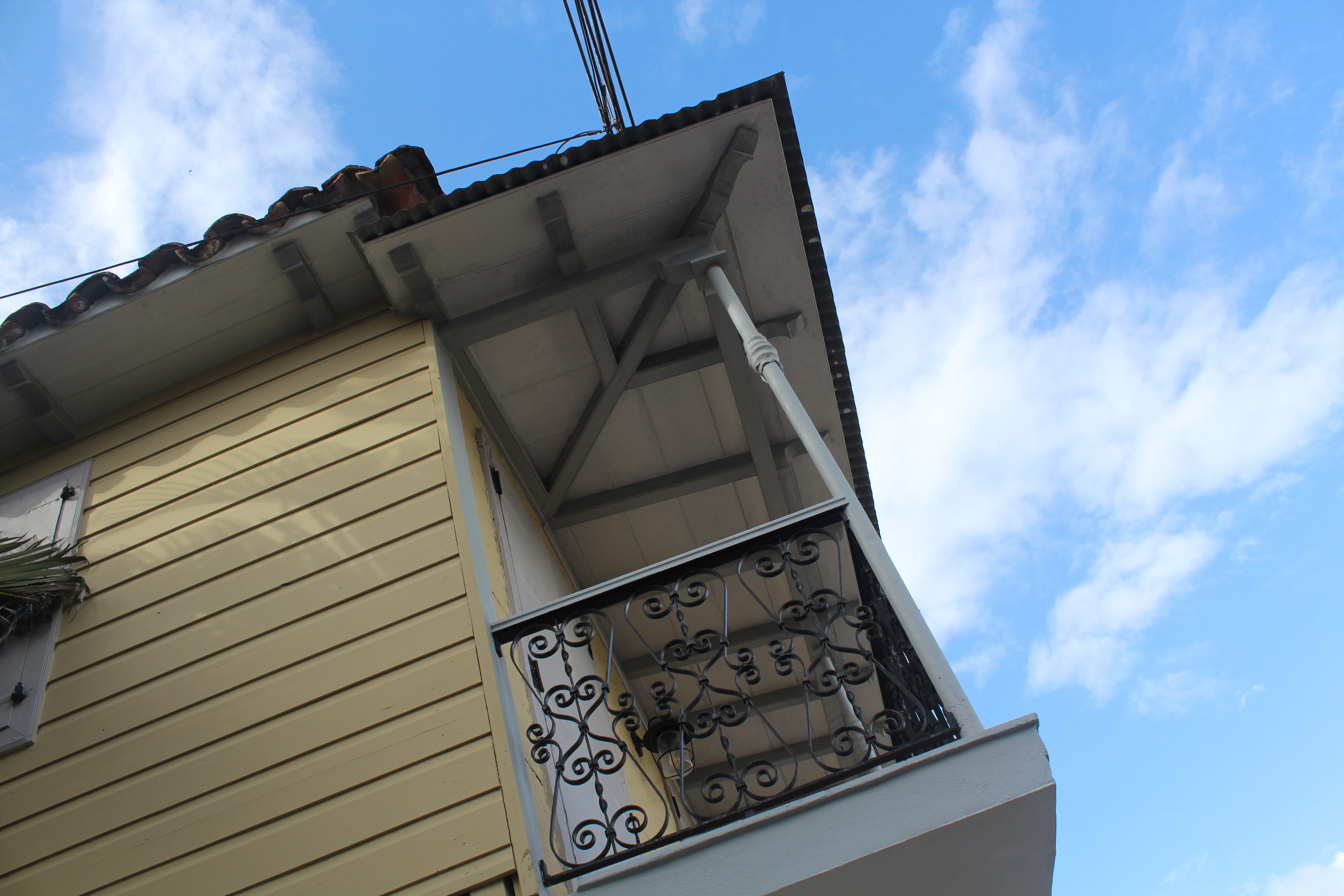
House balcony detail in 2023.

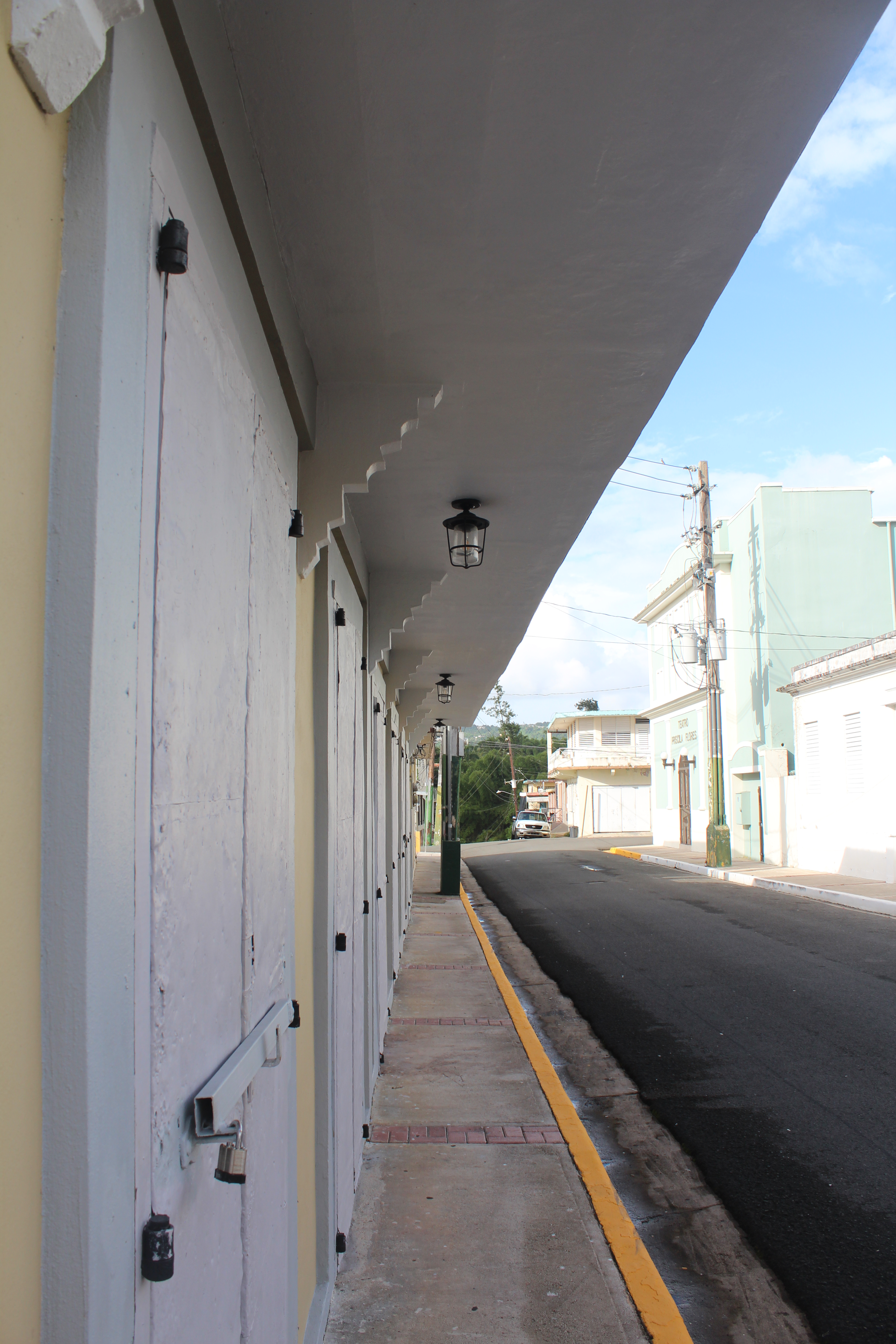
Front entrance across the town square (plaza pública) in 2023.

== See also ==
- Canary Islander immigration to Puerto Rico
- National Register of Historic Places listings in central Puerto Rico
