= Cidra (disambiguation) =

Cucurbita ficifolia is a species of squash, grown for its edible seeds, fruit, and greens.

Cidra may also refer to:

- Cidra, Puerto Rico, a municipality
- Cidra, Añasco, Puerto Rico, a barrio
- Cidra barrio-pueblo, a barrio
