= Antonio Torres =

Antonio Torres may refer to:

- Antonio Torres (baseball) (1931–2023), Colombian baseball manager
- António Torres (rower) (1921–2009), Portuguese rower
- Antonio de Torres Jurado (1817–1892), Spanish guitarist and luthier
- Antonio Torres Pérez (born 1945), Puerto Rican comedian
- Antonio Torres (Sunset Beach), a character from the American soap opera Sunset Beach
- Antoni Torres (1943–2003), Spanish footballer
- Antonio C. Torres (1885–1951), founder of the Order of the Knights of Rizal
