= Río Abajo, Cidra, Puerto Rico =

Barrio of Puerto Rico

Río Abajo
- Barrio
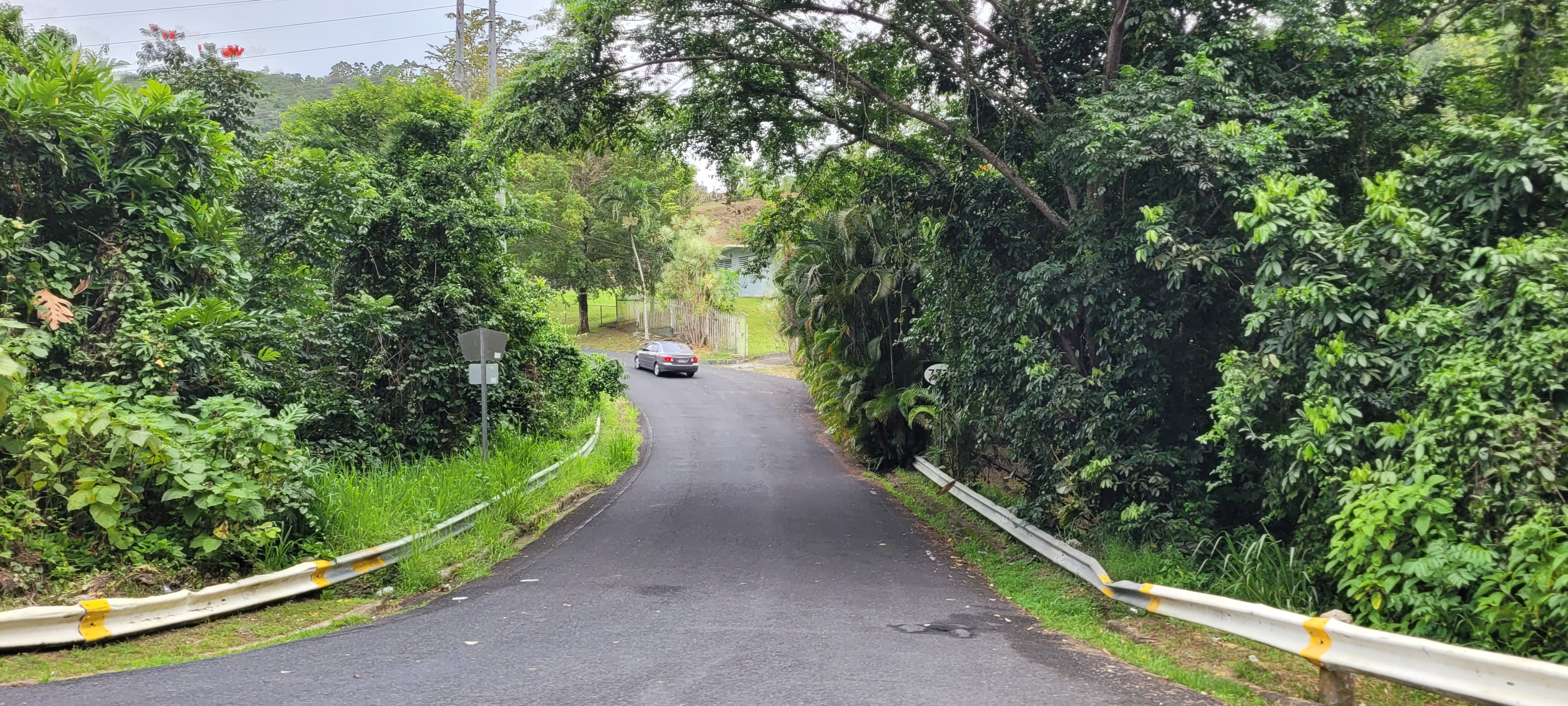
- Puerto Rico Highway 7775 in Río Abajo

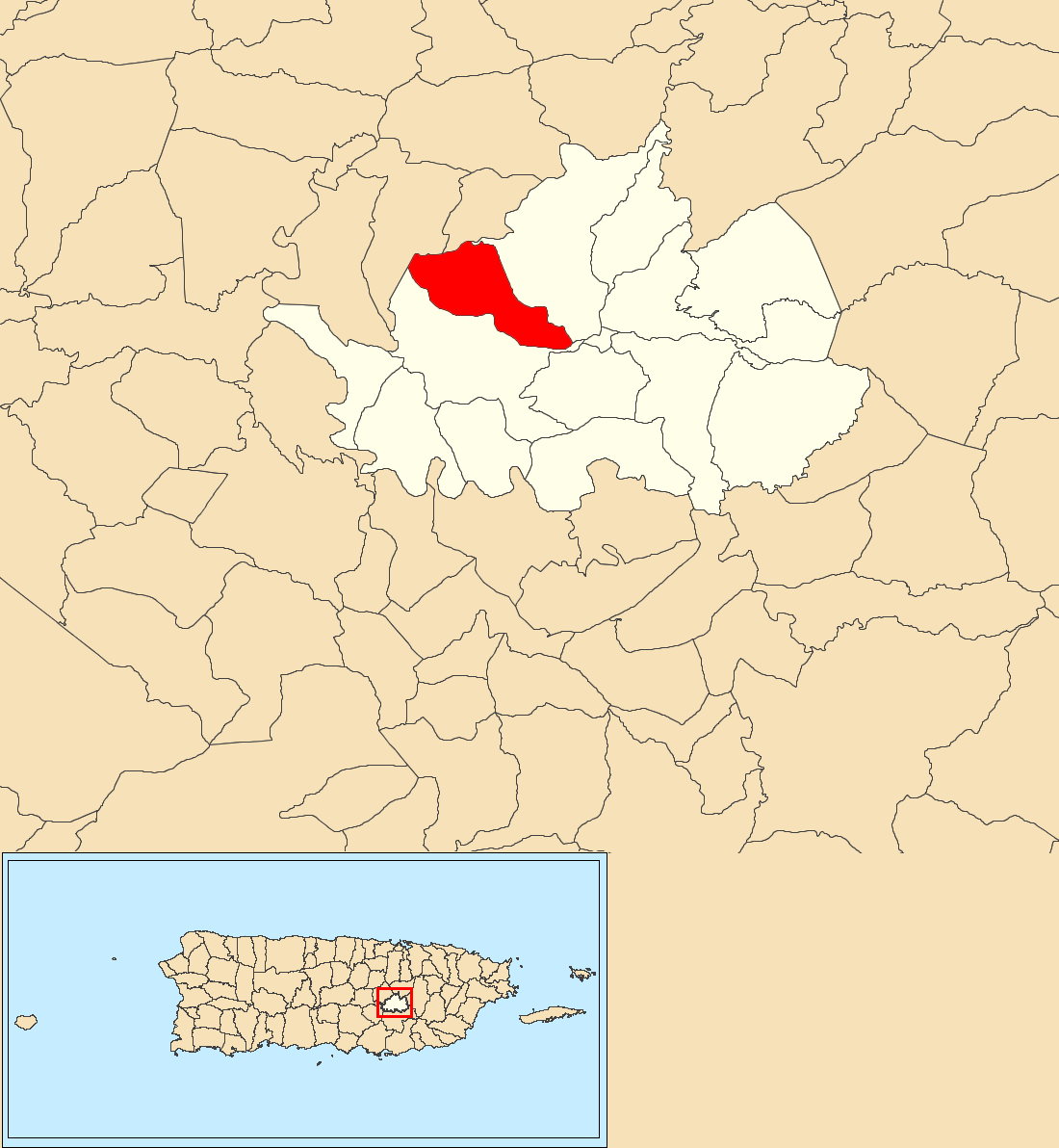
- Location of Río Abajo within the municipality of Cidra shown in red

- Location of Puerto Rico
- Coordinates: 18°11′14″N 66°11′24″W
- Commonwealth: Puerto Rico
- Municipality: Cidra

Area
  - Total: 2.17 sq mi (5.6 km^{2})
  - Land: 2.17 sq mi (5.6 km^{2})
  - Water: 0 sq mi (0 km^{2})
- Elevation: 1,388 ft (423 m)

Population (2010)
  - Total: 1,097
  - Density: 505.5/sq mi (195.2/km^{2})
- Source: 2010 Census
- Time zone: UTC−4 (AST)
- ZIP Code: 00739
- Area code: 787/939

Río Abajo is a barrio in the municipality of Cidra, Puerto Rico. Its population in 2010 was 1,097.

== History ==
Río Abajo was in Spain's gazetteers until Puerto Rico was ceded by Spain in the aftermath of the Spanish–American War under the terms of the Treaty of Paris of 1898 and became an unincorporated territory of the United States. In 1899, the United States Department of War conducted a census of Puerto Rico finding that the combined population of Río Abajo and Ceiba barrios was 1,100.

Historical population
Census	Pop.	Note	%±
1910	620		—
1920	1,034		66.8%
1930	1,376		33.1%
1940	1,321		−4.0%
1950	920		−30.4%
1960	1,143		24.2%
1970	913		−20.1%
1980	778		−14.8%
1990	1,020		31.1%
2000	1,214		19.0%
2010	1,097		−9.6%
U.S. Decennial Census; 1900 (N/A) 1910-1930; 1930-1950 1980-2000 2010

== Sectors ==
Barrios (which are, in contemporary times, roughly comparable to minor civil divisions) in turn are further subdivided into smaller local populated place areas/units called sectores (sectors in English). The types of sectores may vary, from normally sector to urbanización to reparto to barriada to residencial, among others.

The following sectors are in Río Abajo barrio:

Berríos, Capilla, Castrodad, Doce, González, La Vega, Los Meléndez, Los Nieves, Luna, Ortíz, Rivera, Vázquez, and Viejo Almacén.

== See also ==
- List of communities in Puerto Rico
- List of barrios and sectors of Cidra, Puerto Rico
