= Certenejas, Cidra, Puerto Rico =

Barrio of Puerto Rico

Certenejas
- Barrio
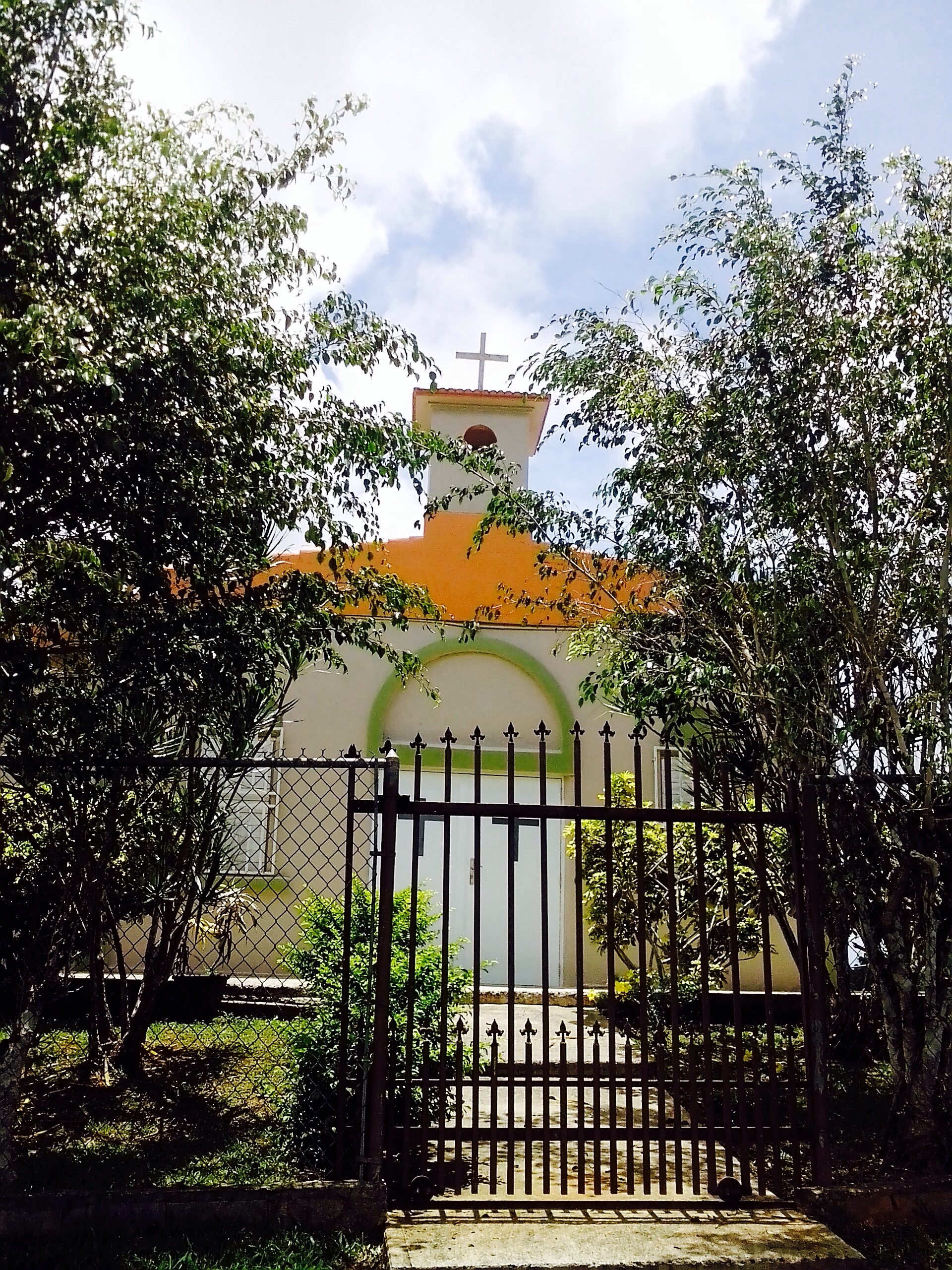
- Capilla San José de Cidra in Certenejas

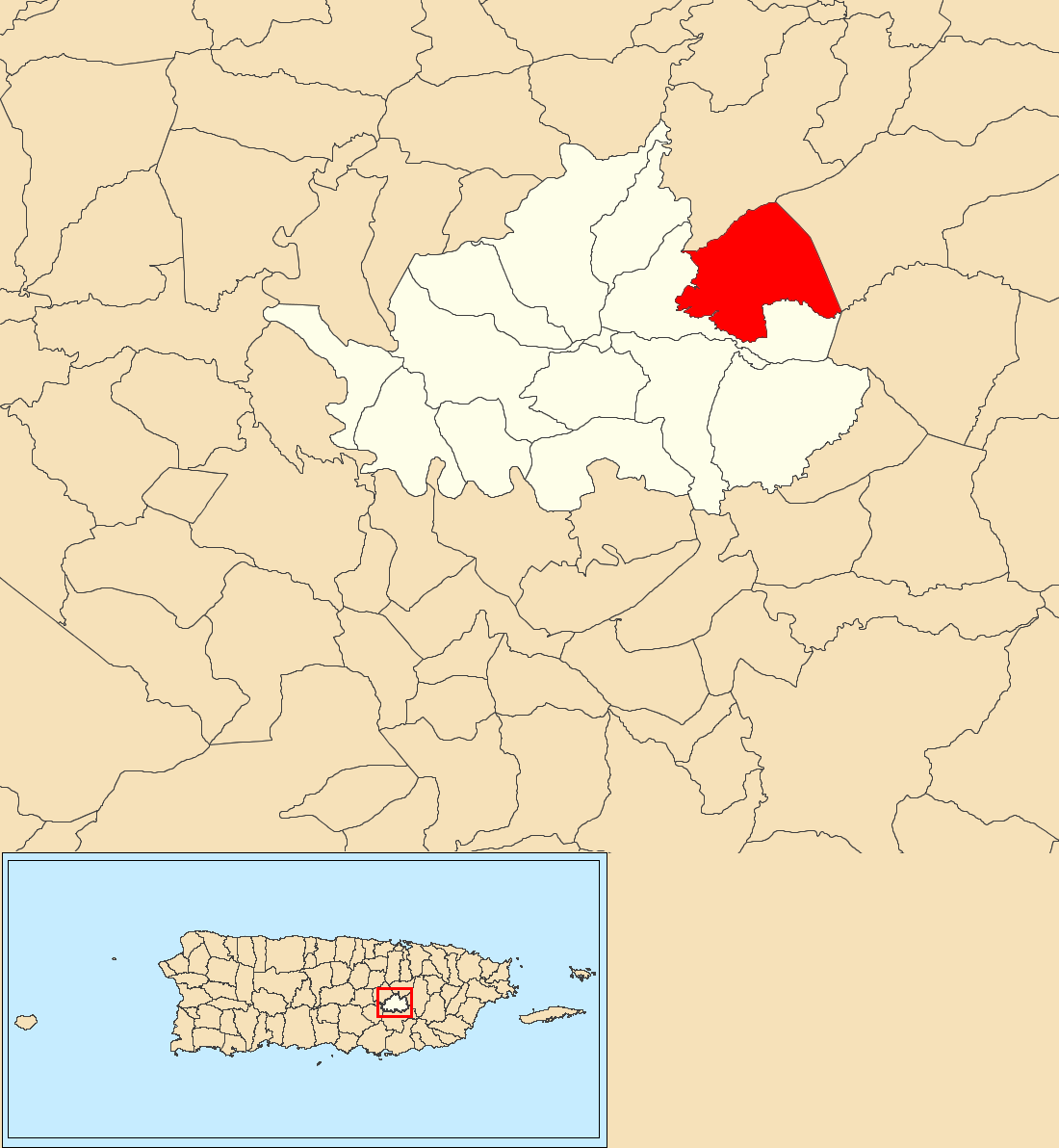
- Location of Certenejas within the municipality of Cidra shown in red

- Location of Puerto Rico
- Coordinates: 18°11′33″N 66°07′19″W
- Commonwealth: Puerto Rico
- Municipality: Cidra

Area
  - Total: 3.52 sq mi (9.1 km^{2})
  - Land: 3.42 sq mi (8.9 km^{2})
  - Water: 0.10 sq mi (0.26 km^{2})
- Elevation: 1,352 ft (412 m)

Population (2010)
  - Total: 6,049
  - Density: 1,768.7/sq mi (682.9/km^{2})
- Source: 2010 Census
- Time zone: UTC−4 (AST)
- ZIP Code: 00739
- Area code: 787/939

Certenejas (Barrio Certenejas) is a barrio in the municipality of Cidra, Puerto Rico. Its population in 2010 was 6,049. A newer barrio, it was formed from part of Bayamón barrio, also in Cidra.

Historical population
Census	Pop.	Note	%±
2010	6,049		—
U.S. Decennial Census; 1899 (shown as 1900) 1910-1930; 1930-1950 1980-2000 2010

== Sectors ==
Barrios (which are, in contemporary times, roughly comparable to minor civil divisions) in turn are further subdivided into smaller local populated place areas/units called sectores (sectors in English). The types of sectores may vary, from normally sector to urbanización to reparto to barriada to residencial, among others.

The following sectors are in Certenejas barrio:

Comunidad San José (Sector Laberinto), Hacienda Primavera, La Península, Salida para Caguas, Sector Certenejas I, Sector El Puente, Sector Juan Colón, Sector Las Palmas, Sector Morales, Sector Olique, Urbanización Campo Lago, and Urbanización Sabanera.

== See also ==
- List of communities in Puerto Rico
- List of barrios and sectors of Cidra, Puerto Rico
