= Toíta, Cidra, Puerto Rico =

Barrio of Puerto Rico

Toíta
- Barrio
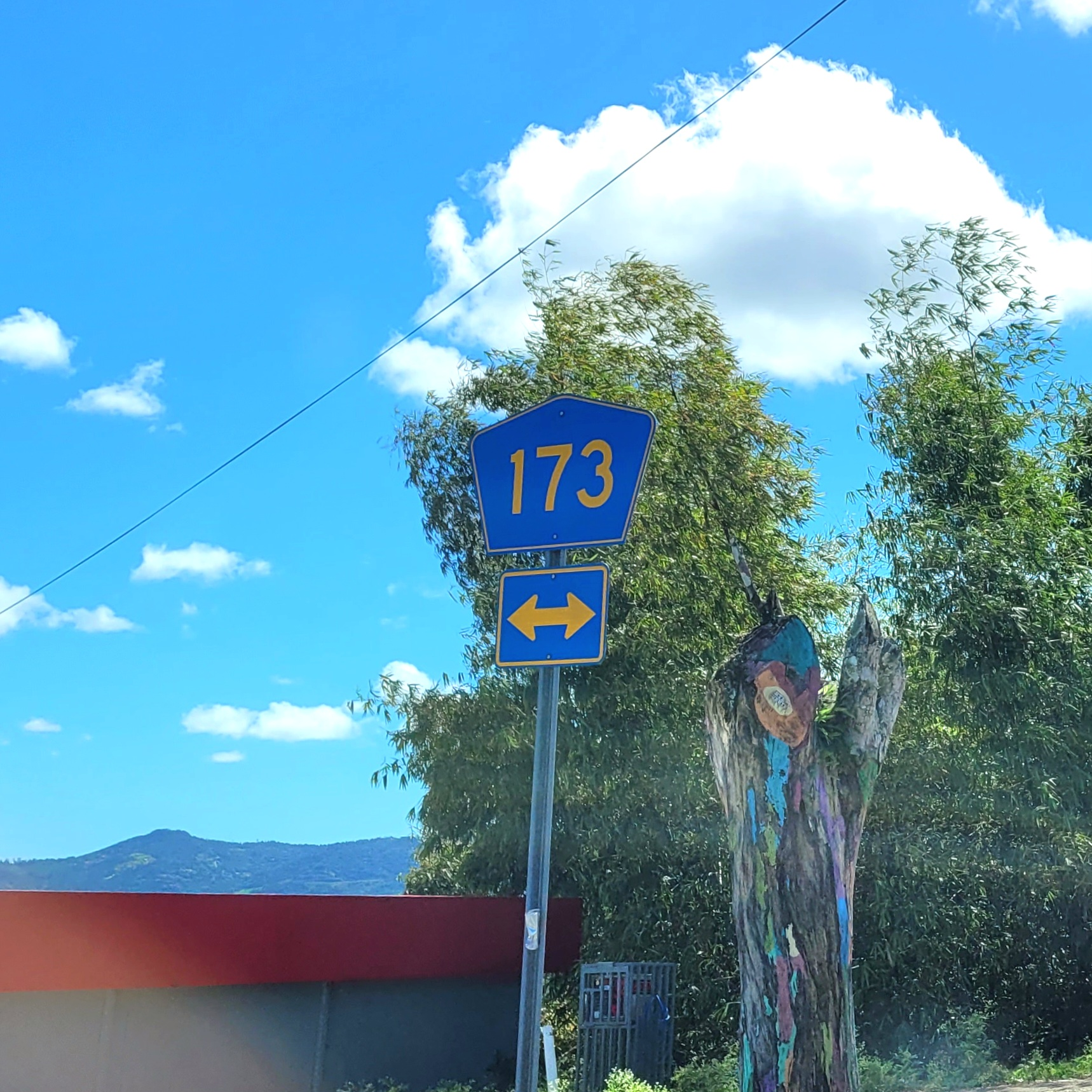
- Puerto Rico Highway 173 between Rabanal and Toíta

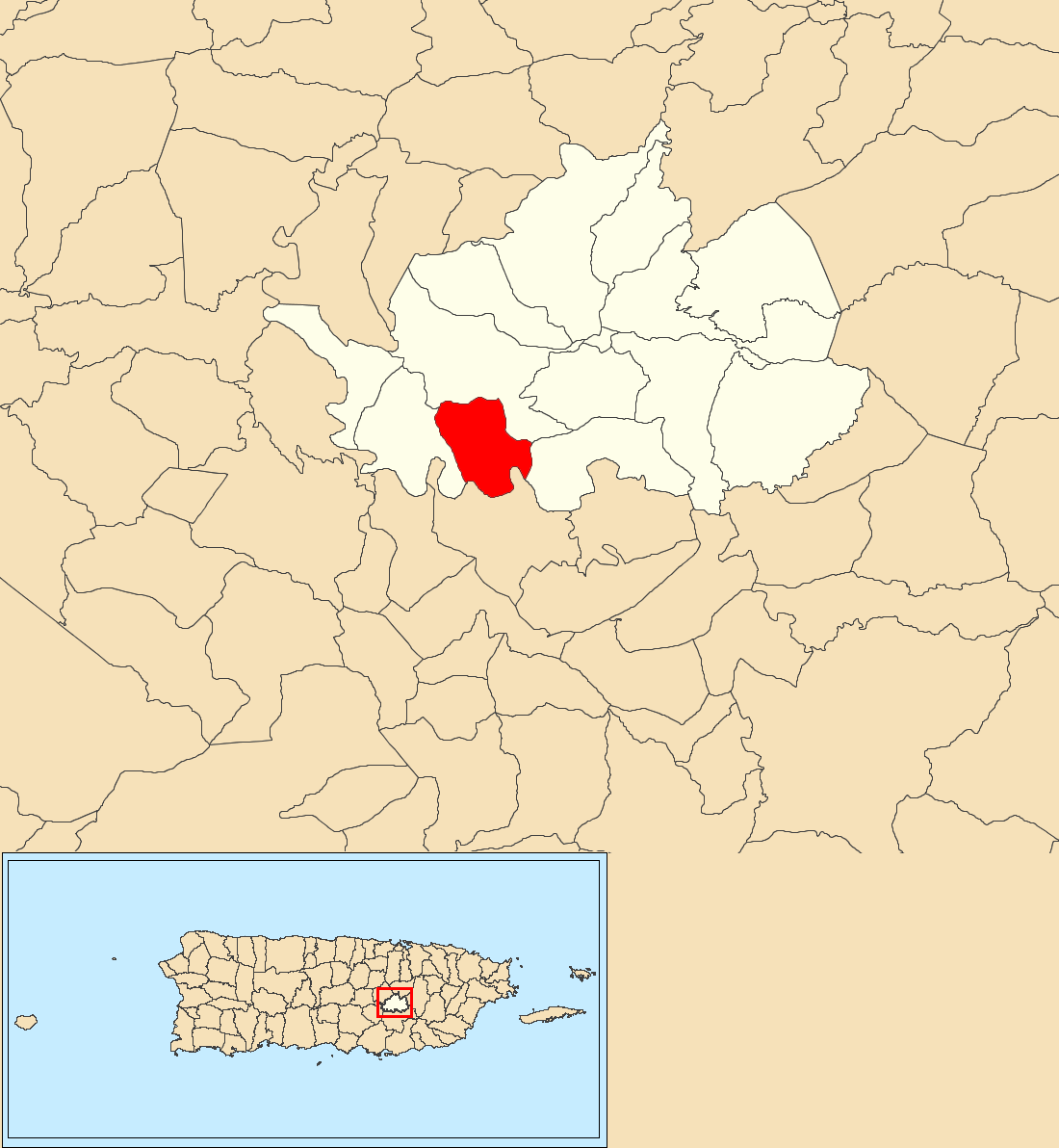
- Location of Toíta within the municipality of Cidra shown in red

- Location of Puerto Rico
- Coordinates: 18°09′00″N 66°11′24″W
- Commonwealth: Puerto Rico
- Municipality: Cidra

Area
  - Total: 1.63 sq mi (4.2 km^{2})
  - Land: 1.63 sq mi (4.2 km^{2})
  - Water: 0 sq mi (0 km^{2})
- Elevation: 1,201 ft (366 m)

Population (2010)
  - Total: 1,068
  - Density: 655.2/sq mi (253.0/km^{2})
- Source: 2010 Census
- Time zone: UTC−4 (AST)
- ZIP Code: 00739
- Area code: 787/939

Toíta is a barrio in the municipality of Cidra, Puerto Rico. Its population in 2010 was 1,068.

== History ==
Toíta was in Spain's gazetteers until Puerto Rico was ceded by Spain in the aftermath of the Spanish–American War under the terms of the Treaty of Paris of 1898 and became an unincorporated territory of the United States. In 1899, the United States Department of War conducted a census of Puerto Rico finding that the combined population of Toíta and Honduras barrio was 800.

Historical population
Census	Pop.	Note	%±
1910	577		—
1920	887		53.7%
1930	700		−21.1%
1940	822		17.4%
1950	744		−9.5%
1960	694		−6.7%
1970	587		−15.4%
1980	584		−0.5%
1990	854		46.2%
2000	996		16.6%
2010	1,068		7.2%
U.S. Decennial Census; 1900 (N/A) 1910-1930; 1930-1950 1980-2000 2010

== Sectors ==
Barrios (which are, in contemporary times, roughly comparable to minor civil divisions) in turn are further subdivided into smaller local populated place areas/units called sectores (sectors in English). The types of sectores may vary, from normally sector to urbanización to reparto to barriada to residencial, among others.

The following sectors are in Toíta barrio:

Capilla, Cruz, Díaz, Federico Ramos, Filemón, Llavona, Los Cotto, Rivera, Rubén González, and Valles del Bravo.

== See also ==
- List of communities in Puerto Rico
- List of barrios and sectors of Cidra, Puerto Rico
