= List of barrios and sectors of Cidra, Puerto Rico =

Like all municipalities of Puerto Rico, Cidra is subdivided into administrative units called barrios, which are, in contemporary times, roughly comparable to minor civil divisions. The barrios and subbarrios, in turn, are further subdivided into smaller local populated place areas/units called sectores (sectors in English). The types of sectores may vary, from normally sector to urbanización to reparto to barriada to residencial, among others.

== List of sectors by barrio ==
=== Arenas ===
- Blancas
- Bosque Real
- Campo Bello
- Domingo Montalván
- El Retiro
- Fanduca
- Gándaras
- Isona
- Justo Rodríguez
- La Liendre
- Las Flores
- Los Padilla
- Los Pinos
- Macelo
- Monticello
- Nogueras
- Permo Quiles
- Quintas de Monticello
- Santa Clara
- Talí o El Trolley
- Valle Real
- Villas de Santa María
- Vista Alegre

=== Bayamón ===
- Aguedo Pagán
- Alturas del Arenal
- Brisas del Campo
- Brisas del Lago
- Campo Primavera
- Calo Rolón
- Cidra Valley
- Cintrón
- Ciudad Primavera
- Delgado
- El Lago
- El Puente
- Estancias de Cidra
- Fito Medina
- Gándaras II
- Hacienda La Cima
- Hacienda Victoria
- Juan del Valle
- La Glorieta
- La Muralla
- Las Mercedes
- Las Nereidas
- Los Cotto
- Los Pianos
- Los Ramos
- Machuquillo
- Mira Monte
- Mónaco
- Monchito Ramos
- Paseo Figueroa
- Primitiva Vázquez
- Quebradillas
- Reparto Maritza
- Rivera
- Tabo Merced
- Treasure Valley
- Treasure Island Gardens
- Trinidad
- Villa Encantada
- Villa Rosa
- Villa San Martín
- Vista Monte
- Vistas de Sabana
- Vistas de Sabanera

=== Beatriz ===
- Bambú
- Brisas de Montecarlo
- Brisas del Plata
- Campito
- Centeno Quiles
- Chavón
- Clavijo
- Ciudad Primavera
- Colinas de Beatriz I
- Colinas de Beatriz II
- Colinas del Capitán
- Colinas Verdes
- El Llano
- Hacienda La Cima
- Huertas
- Juan González
- La Bomba
- La Jurado
- La Vega
- Las Cruces
- Los Gómez
- Los Soto
- Monte Verde o Colinas
- Muñoz Grillo
- Ortíz
- Pesquera
- Valle de Beatriz
- Valle Verde o Sapera
- Virginia

=== Ceiba ===
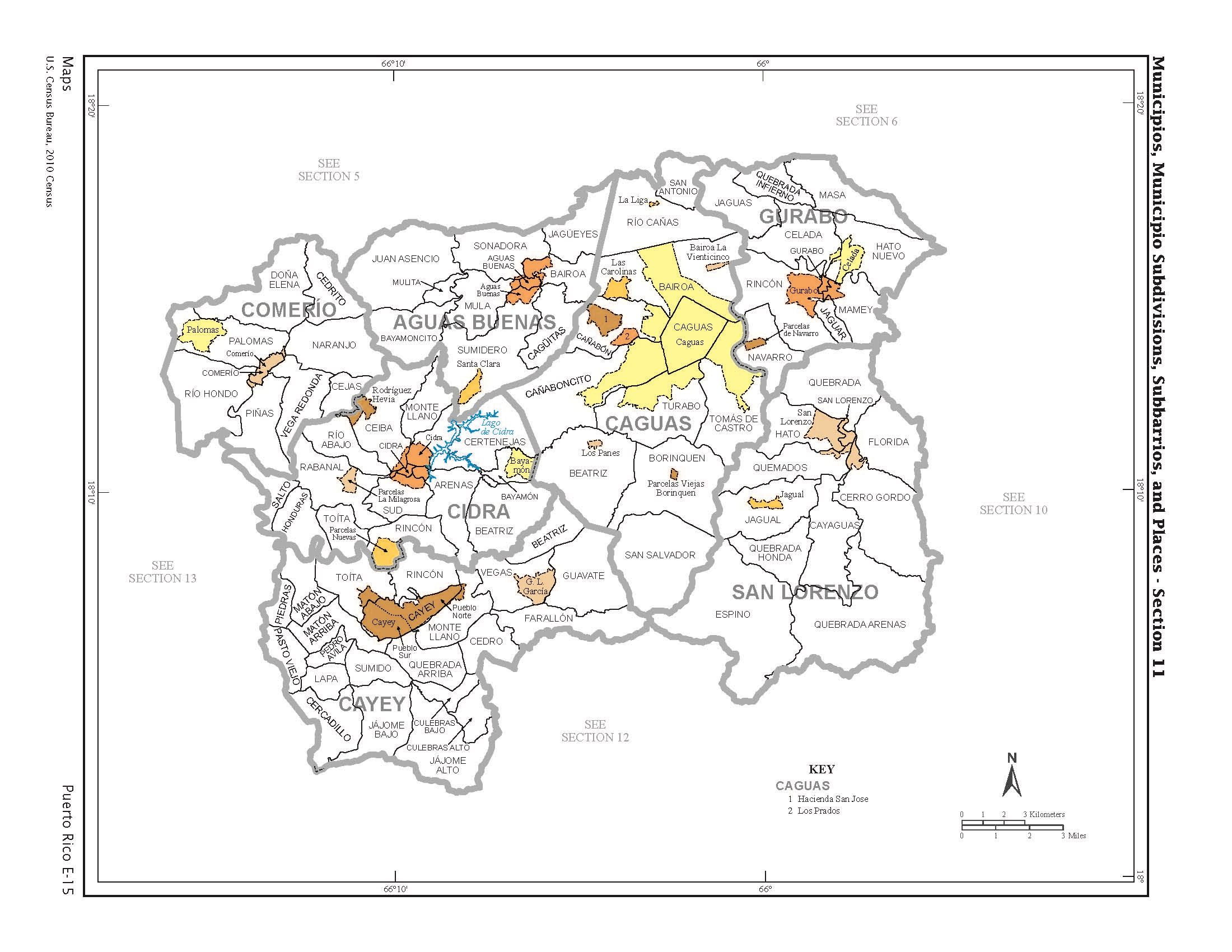
US 2010 Census map showing sectors and places in Cidra including a place called Rodriguez Hevia in Ceiba barrio

- Agustín Cruz Ojeda
- Agustín Santos
- Carrasquillo
- Delgado o El Llano
- Escalera
- Euclides Rivera
- Estancias de Monte Río
- Falcón
- Flores
- Garced
- González
- Hevias
- Jacinto Hernández
- Joya Abajo
- La Frontera
- Las Paletas
- Meléndez
- Naranjo
- Pablo Santos
- Peregín Santos
- Rafi Ruíz
- Ruíz

=== Certenejas^{*} ===
- Basilio Meléndez
- Campo Lago
- Capilla
- Cortés
- Daniel Pagán
- El Puente
- González
- Jesús Morales
- Juan Colón
- La Inmaculada
- La Península
- Los Meléndez
- Las Palmas
- Los Oliques
- Los Yuya
- Monte Verde
- Morales
- Nogales
- Palmeras
- Praderas del Bosque
- Ramos
- San José (Laberinto)
- Urbanización Estancias del Bosque
- Urbanización Hacienda La Paloma
- Urbanización Hacienda Primavera
- Urbanización Sabanaera
- Urbanización Villas del Bosque
- Vélez

=== Cidra barrio-pueblo ===
- Barriada Ferrer
- Domingo Rodríguez
- El Cielito
- Fernández
- Ferrer
- Freire
- Jardines de Cidra
- La Cuatro
- Los Almendros
- Práxedes Santiago
- Samuel Quiles
- Santa Teresita
- Villa del Carmen

=== Honduras ===
- Bernard
- Caña
- Díaz
- El Malecón
- Galindo
- La Loma
- Muñiz
- Polo Torres
- Puente Blanco
- San José

=== Monte Llano ===
- Bloquera
- Carruso
- Dones
- Escuela
- Fernández
- González
- Martín Reyes
- Monchito Pérez
- Nuñez o La Capilla
- Ortíz
- Resbalosa
- Rodríguez
- Solano

=== Rabanal ===
Although Rabanal officially consists of only one single barrio, it is traditionally subdivided into two areas or sub-barrios:

==== Rabanal Norte ====
- Almirante
- Comunidades Unidas
- Cortés
- Finca Alicea
- Flores de la Riviera o Las Flores
- Haciendas de Cidra o El Banco
- Jardines de Rabanal
- Jardines de la Cumbre
- La Milagrosa
- Las Jaguas
- Mejías
- Meléndez

==== Rabanal Sur ====
- Alejandro
- Alturas de Cidra
- Borrero
- Colinas de Buenos Aires
- Diego Rivera
- El Buen Pastor
- El Paraíso
- Fátima
- Jolujo
- Jiménez o Loma de los Jiménez
- La Cumbre
- La Loma
- La Pastora
- Lomas de Rabanal
- Los Bravos
- Los Dos Mangoes
- Los Panes
- Malavé
- Millo Reyes
- Monseñor Ignacio González
- Piñeiro
- San José
- Tierra Linda
- Tres y Medio (3½)

=== Rincón ===
- Barriada I
- Barriada II
- Candelas
- Chichón
- Cotto
- Entrada Capilla
- García I
- García II
- La Herradura
- La Línea
- La Veguita
- Los López
- Nogueras
- Rancho Díaz
- Rafael Berríos
- Torres
- Villa Rosa
- Vitín La Torre

=== Río Abajo ===
Río Abajo was listed on the Special Communities in 2011 by the Puerto Rico Office for Socioeconomic and Community Development.

- Berríos
- Capilla
- Castrodad
- Doce
- González
- La Vega
- Los Meléndez
- Los Nieves
- Luna
- Ortíz
- Rivera
- Vázquez
- Viejo Almacén

=== Salto ===
- El Mirador
- Esperanza Rivera
- González
- La Tosca
- Luto Félix
- Luz María
- Martín Ramos
- Rivera
- San José

=== Sud ===
- Anaya
- Baltazar Rodríguez
- Casillas
- Colina del Paraíso
- Collazo
- Domingo Alejandro
- El Gallíto
- El Tamarindo
- Flores
- Franco
- Jardines de Villa del Carmen
- La Ceiba
- La Loma
- Los Hernández Arriba
- Montalván
- Palmasola
- Poldo Escribano
- Práxedes Santiago
- Ramos Antonini
- Rodríguez
- Torres
- Valle Universitario
- Valles de Cidra
- Villa del Carmen
- Vista Hermosa
- Vistas de Cidra

=== Toíta ===
- Capilla
- Cruz
- Díaz
- Federico Ramos
- Filemón
- Llavona
- Los Cotto
- Rivera
- Rubén González
- Valles del Bravo

Note:

^{*} - Formerly part of Barrio Bayamón, officially constituted by Law 77 of 2009

Source: Cidra (Puerto Rico) - Wikipedia

== See also ==
- List of communities in Puerto Rico
