= Monte Llano, Cidra, Puerto Rico =

Barrio of Puerto Rico

Monte Llano
- Barrio
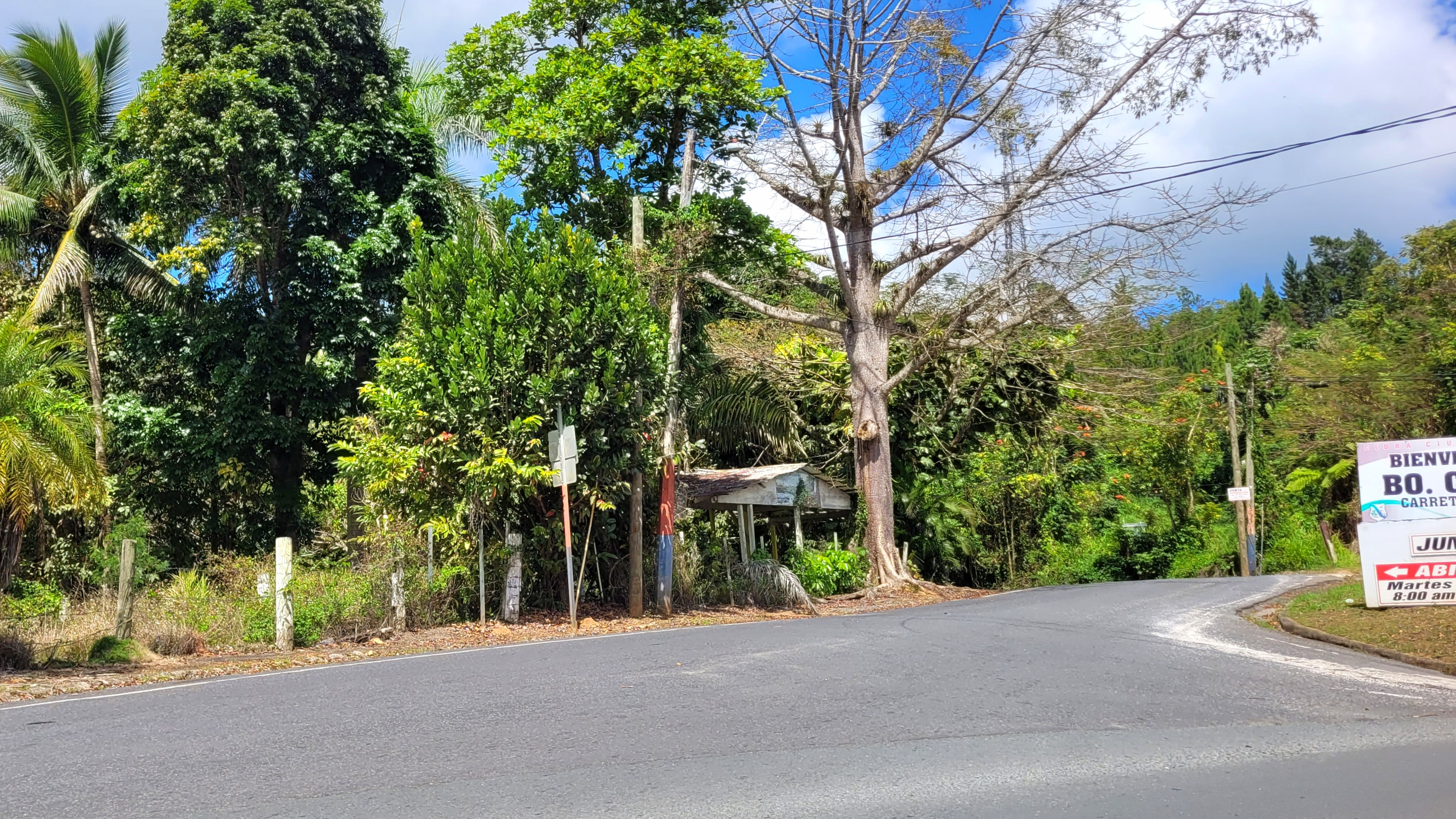
- Puerto Rico Highway 782 between Monte Llano and Ceiba

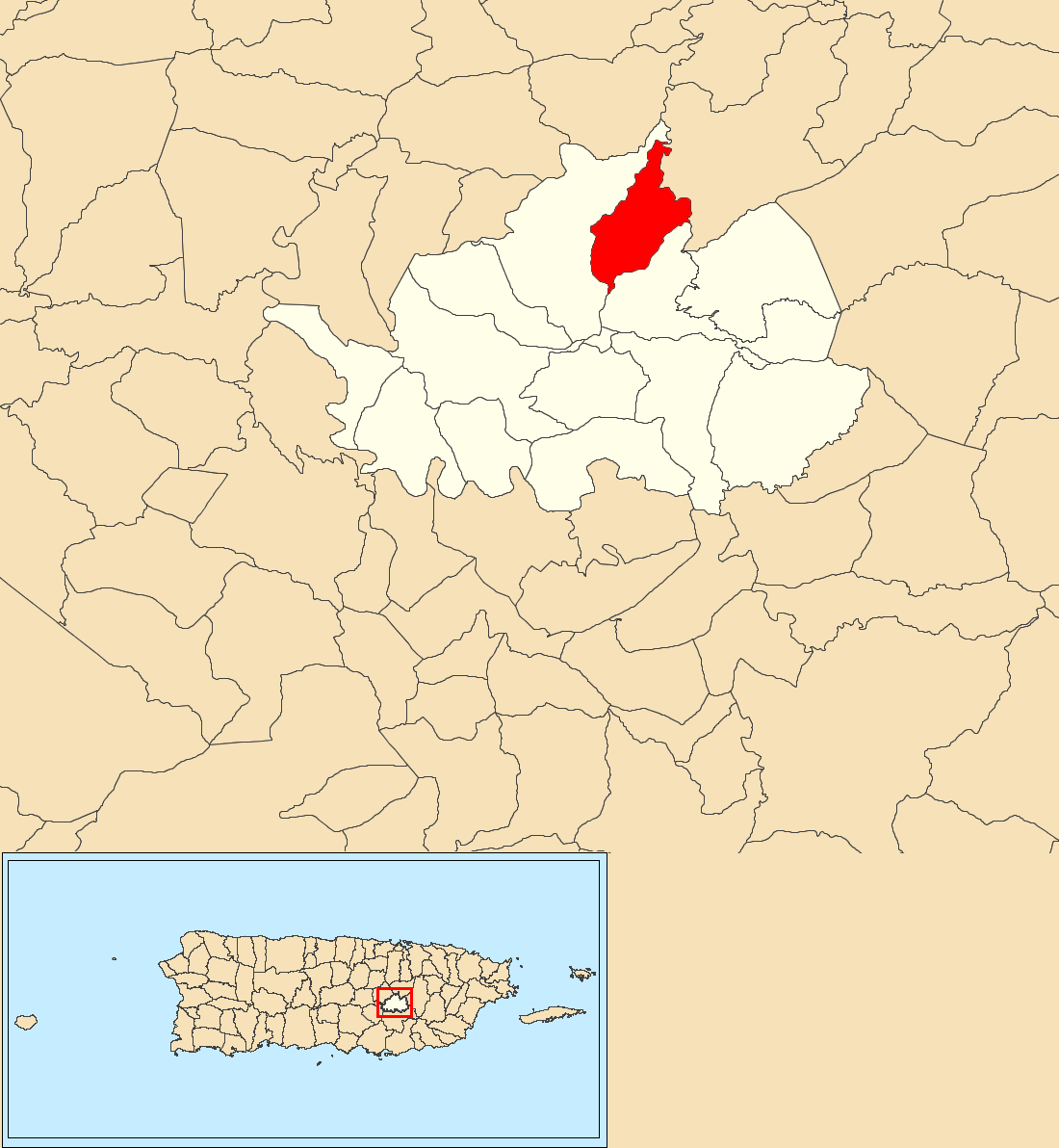
- Location of Monte Llano within the municipality of Cidra shown in red

- Location of Puerto Rico
- Coordinates: 18°12′12″N 66°09′16″W
- Commonwealth: Puerto Rico
- Municipality: Cidra

Area
  - Total: 1.9 sq mi (4.9 km^{2})
  - Land: 1.9 sq mi (4.9 km^{2})
  - Water: 0 sq mi (0 km^{2})
- Elevation: 1,526 ft (465 m)

Population (2010)
  - Total: 984
  - Density: 517.9/sq mi (200.0/km^{2})
- Source: 2010 Census
- Time zone: UTC−4 (AST)
- ZIP Code: 00739
- Area code: 787/939

Monte Llano is a barrio in the municipality of Cidra, Puerto Rico. Its population in 2010 was 984.

== History ==
Monte Llano was in Spain's gazetteers until Puerto Rico was ceded by Spain in the aftermath of the Spanish–American War under the terms of the Treaty of Paris of 1898 and became an unincorporated territory of the United States. In 1899, the United States Department of War conducted a census of Puerto Rico finding that the combined population of Monte Llano and Bayamón barrios was 1,222.

Historical population
| Census | Pop. | Note | %± |
|---|---|---|---|
| 1910 | 469 | | — |
| 1920 | 1,003 | | 113.9% |
| 1930 | 1,120 | | 11.7% |
| 1940 | 1,240 | | 10.7% |
| 1950 | 1,066 | | −14.0% |
| 1960 | 1,071 | | 0.5% |
| 1970 | 922 | | −13.9% |
| 1980 | 618 | | −33.0% |
| 1990 | 731 | | 18.3% |
| 2000 | 956 | | 30.8% |
| 2010 | 984 | | 2.9% |
U.S. Decennial Census; 1900 (N/A) 1910-1930; 1930-1950 1980-2000 2010

== Sectors ==
Barrios (which are, in contemporary times, roughly comparable to minor civil divisions) in turn are further subdivided into smaller local populated place areas/units called sectores (sectors in English). The types of sectores may vary, from normally sector to urbanización to reparto to barriada to residencial, among others.

The following sectors are in Monte Llano barrio:

Bloquera, Carruso, Dones, Escuela, Fernández, González, Martín Reyes, Monchito Pérez, Nuñez o La Capilla, Ortíz, Resbalosa, Rodríguez, and Solano.

== See also ==
- List of communities in Puerto Rico
- List of barrios and sectors of Cidra, Puerto Rico
