= Bayamón (disambiguation) =

Bayamón may refer to:

== Places ==
- Bayamón, Puerto Rico, a municipality
- Bayamón, Cidra, Puerto Rico, a barrio
- Bayamón barrio-pueblo, a barrio
