= Salto, Cidra, Puerto Rico =

Barrio of Puerto Rico

Salto
- Barrio
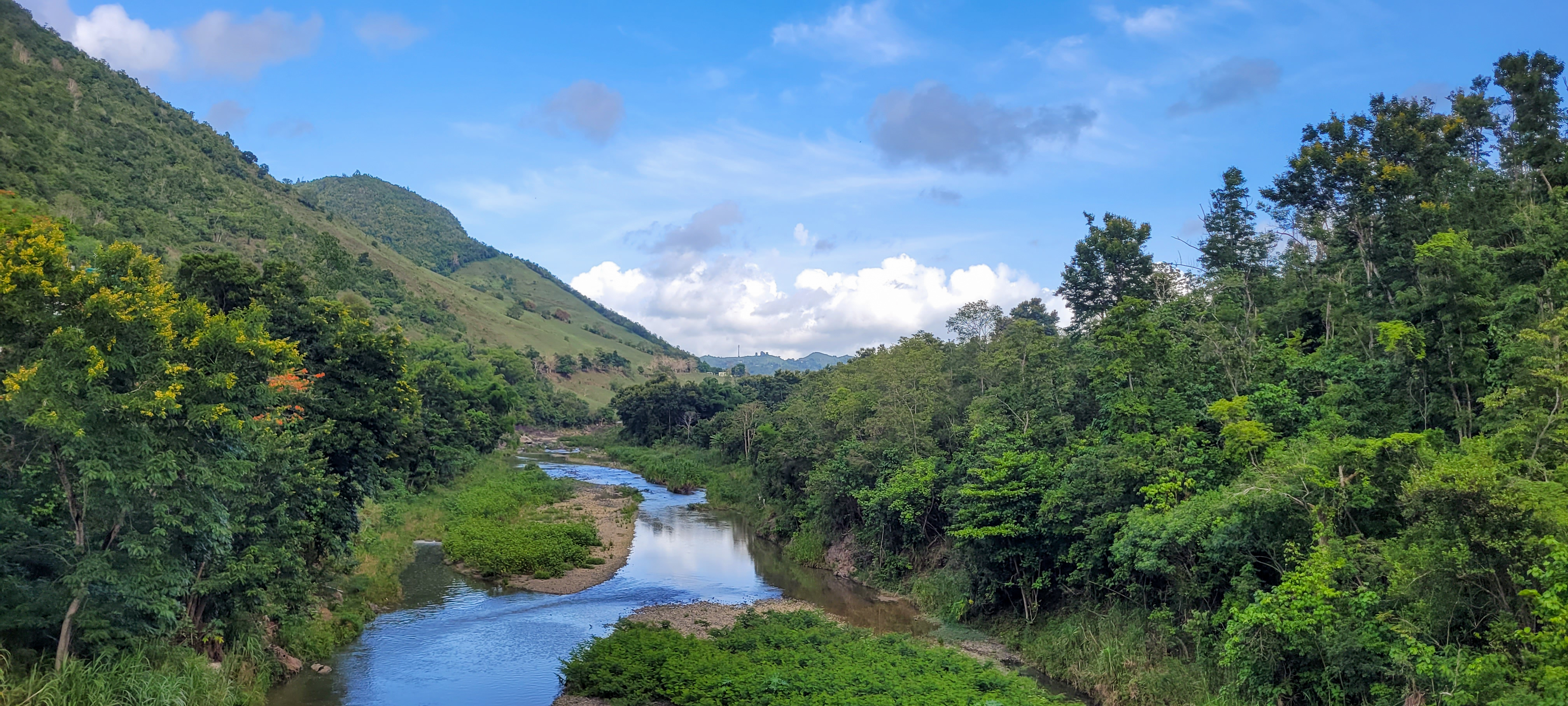
- Río de la Plata between Salto (Cidra) and Plata (Aibonito) barrios

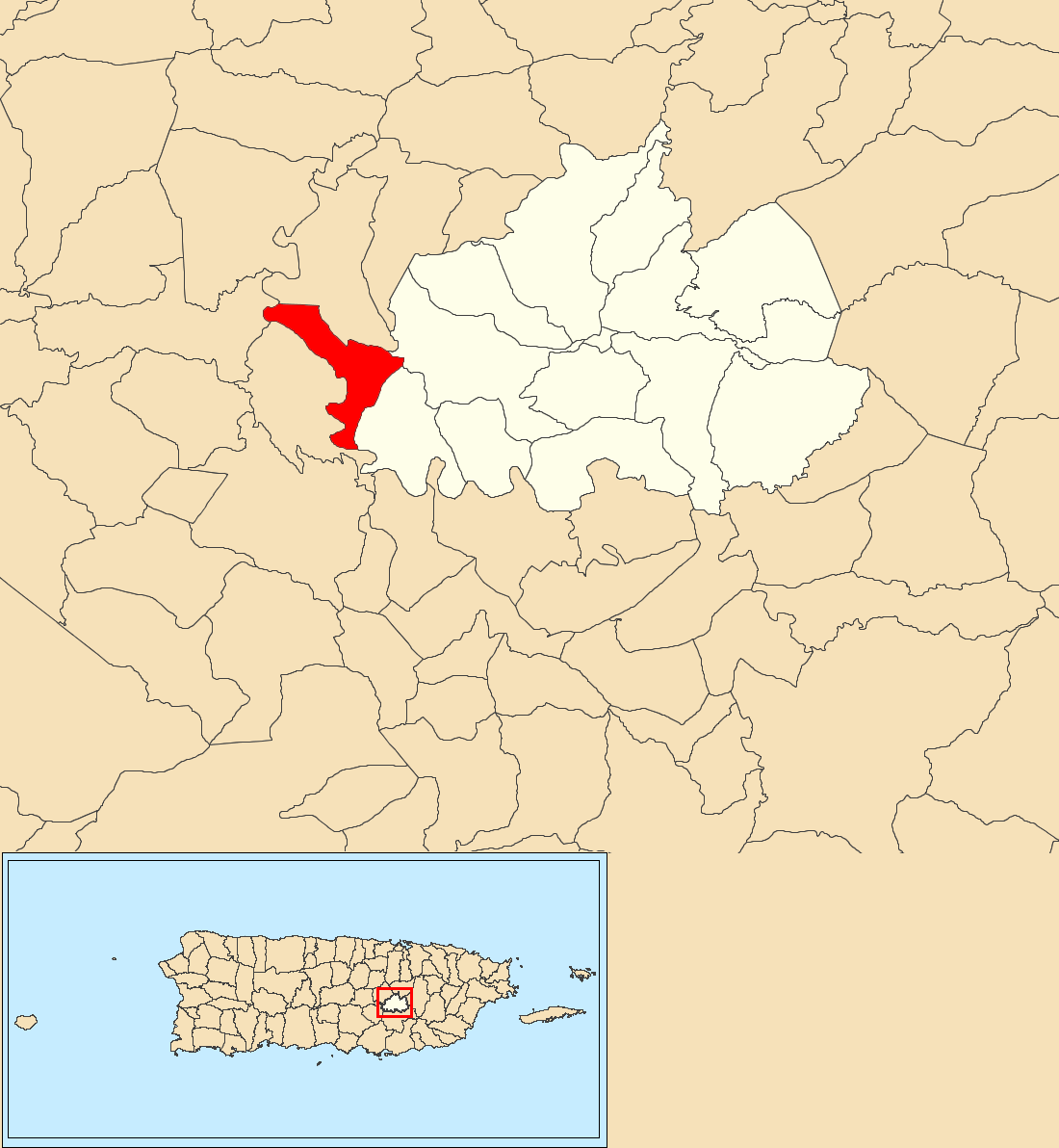
- Location of Salto within the municipality of Cidra shown in red

- Location of Puerto Rico
- Coordinates: 18°10′11″N 66°13′30″W
- Commonwealth: Puerto Rico
- Municipality: Cidra

Area
  - Total: 1.64 sq mi (4.2 km^{2})
  - Land: 1.64 sq mi (4.2 km^{2})
  - Water: 0 sq mi (0 km^{2})
- Elevation: 1,253 ft (382 m)

Population (2010)
  - Total: 176
  - Density: 107.3/sq mi (41.4/km^{2})
- Source: 2010 Census
- Time zone: UTC−4 (AST)
- ZIP Code: 00739
- Area code: 787/939

Salto is a barrio in the municipality of Cidra, Puerto Rico. Its population in 2010 was 176.

== History ==
Salto was in Spain's gazetteers until Puerto Rico was ceded by Spain in the aftermath of the Spanish–American War under the terms of the Treaty of Paris of 1898 and became an unincorporated territory of the United States. In 1899, the United States Department of War conducted a census of Puerto Rico finding that the combined population of Salto and Rabanal barrios was 1,498.

Historical population
Census	Pop.	Note	%±
1910	837		—
1920	1,046		25.0%
1930	1,256		20.1%
1940	888		−29.3%
1950	591		−33.4%
1960	618		4.6%
1970	329		−46.8%
1980	187		−43.2%
1990	646		245.5%
2000	36		−94.4%
2010	176		388.9%
U.S. Decennial Census; 1900 (N/A) 1910-1930; 1930-1950 1980-2000 2010

== Sectors ==
Barrios (which are, in contemporary times, roughly comparable to minor civil divisions) in turn are further subdivided into smaller local populated place areas/units called sectores (sectors in English). The types of sectores may vary, from normally sector to urbanización to reparto to barriada to residencial, among others.

The following sectors are in Salto barrio:

El Mirador, Esperanza Rivera, González, La Tosca, Luto Félix, Luz María, Martín Ramos, Rivera, and San José.

== See also ==
- List of communities in Puerto Rico
- List of barrios and sectors of Cidra, Puerto Rico
