= Arenas, Cidra, Puerto Rico =

Barrio of Puerto Rico

Arenas
- Barrio
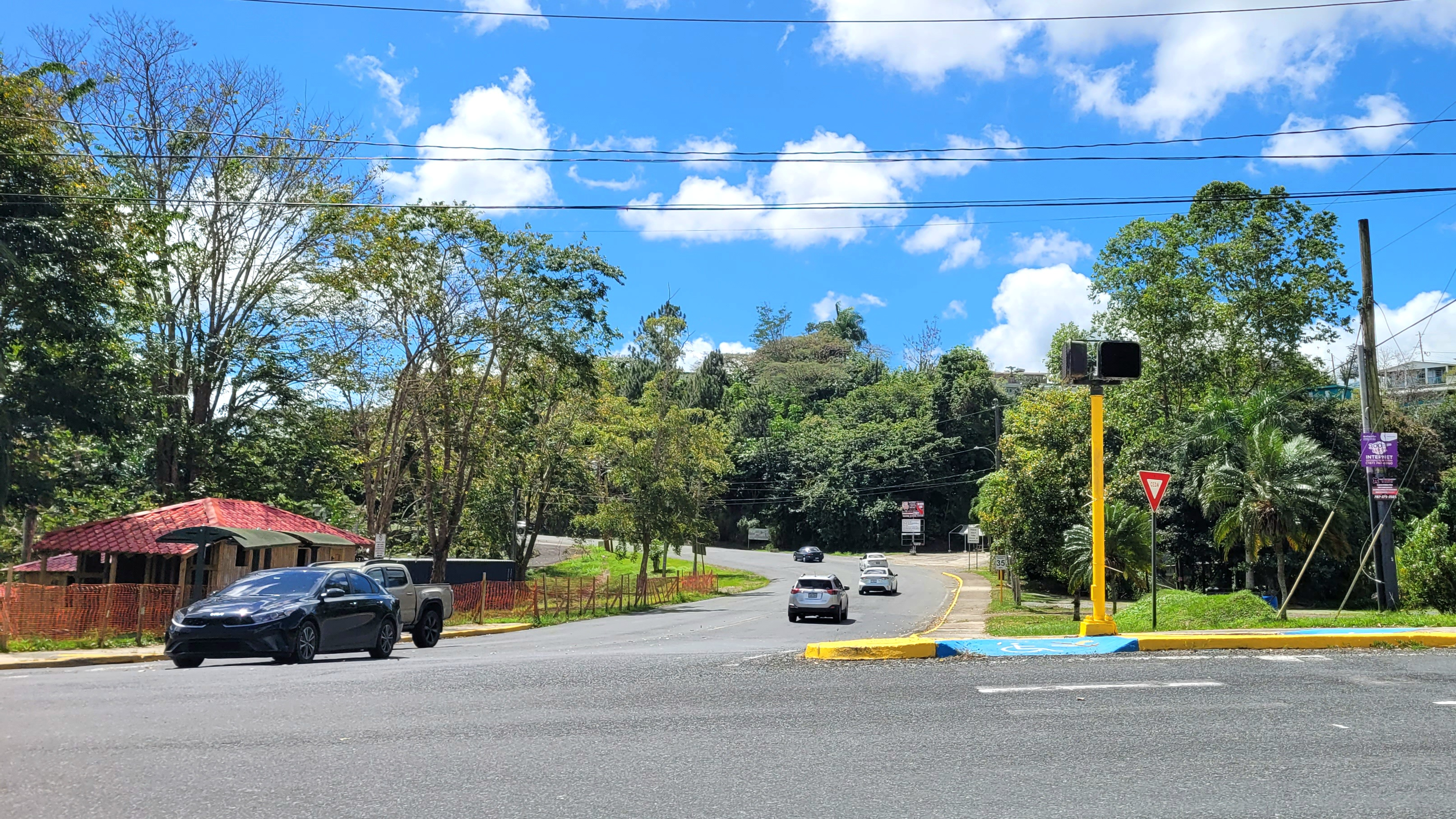
- Puerto Rico Highway 7733 in Arenas

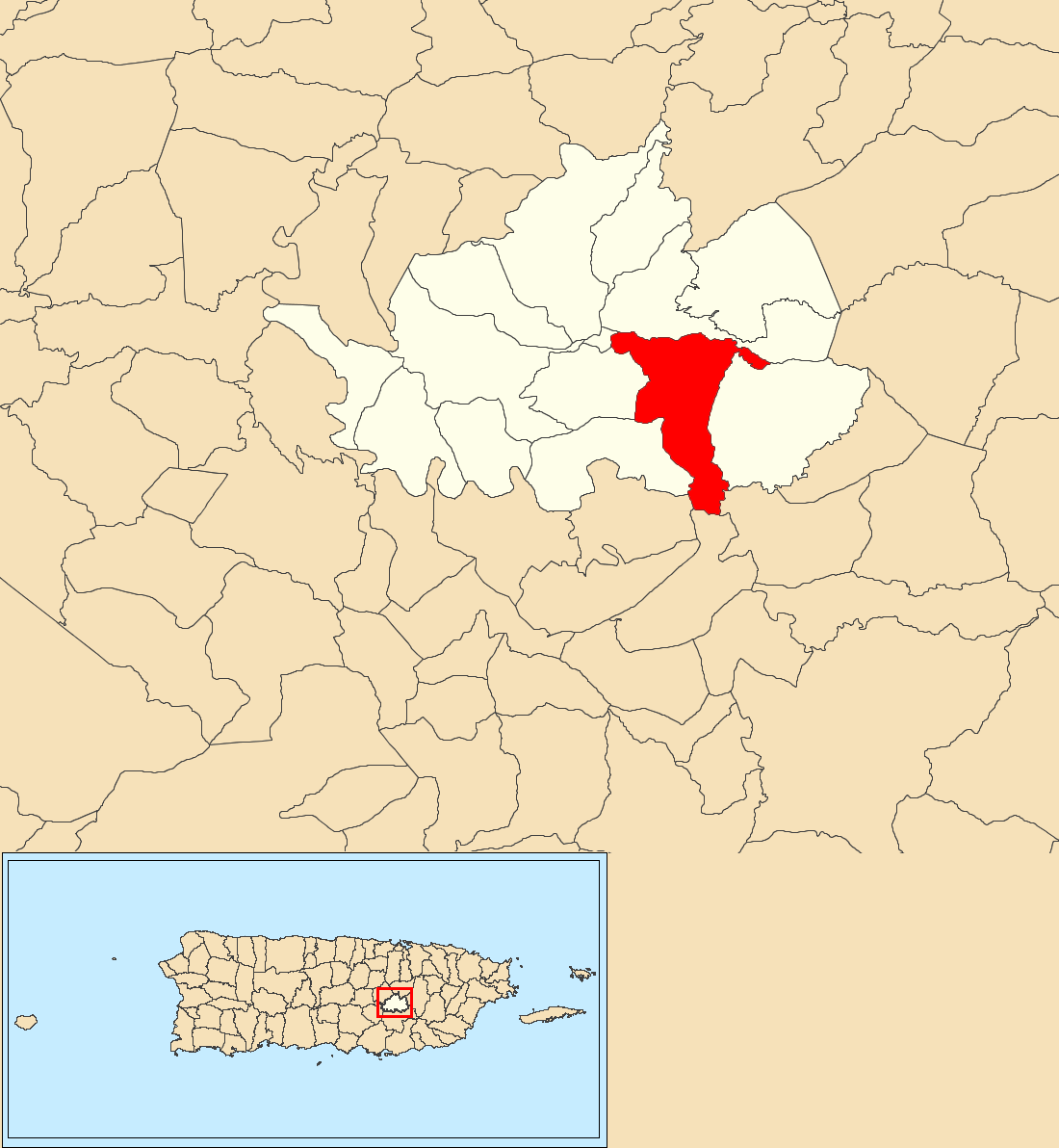
- Location of Arenas within the municipality of Cidra shown in red

- Location of Puerto Rico
- Coordinates: 18°09′55″N 66°08′16″W
- Commonwealth: Puerto Rico
- Municipality: Cidra

Area
  - Total: 3.12 sq mi (8.1 km^{2})
  - Land: 3.10 sq mi (8.0 km^{2})
  - Water: 0.02 sq mi (0.052 km^{2})
- Elevation: 1,663 ft (507 m)

Population (2010)
  - Total: 6,123
  - Density: 1,975.2/sq mi (762.6/km^{2})
- Source: 2010 Census
- Time zone: UTC−4 (AST)
- ZIP Code: 00739
- Area code: 787/939

Arenas is a barrio in the municipality of Cidra, Puerto Rico. Its population in 2010 was 6,123.

== History ==
Arenas was in Spain's gazetteers until Puerto Rico was ceded by Spain in the aftermath of the Spanish–American War under the terms of the Treaty of Paris of 1898 and became an unincorporated territory of the United States. In 1899, the United States Department of War conducted a census of Puerto Rico finding that the combined population of Arenas barrio and Beatriz barrio was 997.

Historical population
| Census | Pop. | Note | %± |
|---|---|---|---|
| 1910 | 771 | | — |
| 1920 | 868 | | 12.6% |
| 1930 | 1,772 | | 104.1% |
| 1940 | 1,771 | | −0.1% |
| 1950 | 2,379 | | 34.3% |
| 1960 | 3,153 | | 32.5% |
| 1970 | 0 | | −100.0% |
| 1980 | 4,170 | | — |
| 1990 | 5,665 | | 35.9% |
| 2000 | 6,239 | | 10.1% |
| 2010 | 6,123 | | −1.9% |
U.S. Decennial Census; 1900 (N/A) 1910-1930; 1930-1950 1980-2000 2010

== Sectors ==
Barrios (which are, in contemporary times, roughly comparable to minor civil divisions) in turn are further subdivided into smaller local populated place areas/units called sectores (sectors in English). The types of sectores may vary, from normally sector to urbanización to reparto to barriada to residencial, among others.

The following sectors are in Arenas barrio:

Calle Roque, Parcelas Blancas, Parcelas Gándara I y II, Parcelas Santa Clara, Quintas de Monticello, Sector Campo Bello, Sector El Retiro, Sector El Trolley (Talí), Sector Fanduca, Sector Isona, Sector Justo Rodríguez, Sector La Liendre, Sector Los Padilla, Sector Los Pinos, Sector Macelo, Sector Nogueras, Sector Permo Quiles, Sector Valle Real, Sector Vista Alegre, Urb. Bosque Real, and Villas Santa María.

In Arenas barrio is part of the Cidra urban zone.

== See also ==
- List of communities in Puerto Rico
- List of barrios and sectors of Cidra, Puerto Rico
