= Soraya Marcano =

Puerto Rican visual artist

- Born: 1965 (age 60–61); Cidra, Puerto Rico
- Education: University of Puerto Rico; Pratt Institute
- Style: Visual arts

Soraya Marcano (born 1965 in Cidra, Puerto Rico) is a visual artist based in New York City. She studied at the University of Puerto Rico and completed a master's degree in Fine Arts at Pratt Institute.

== Work ==
Her mixed media artwork has been exhibited internationally and it is represented in public and private collections, including the Museum of Contemporary Art of Chamalieres, Center for the Humanities, The New York Public Library, Rockefeller Library, and Institute of Puerto Rican Culture, among others. Marcano has participated in international artist-in-residence programs, including White Colony, Millay Colony and the Jamaica Center for the Arts; furthermore, she is the recipient of several recognitions and awards. She has also been an educator at Bronx Museum of the Arts, El Museo del Barrio, and The Guggenheim Museum.

Her work, which includes mixed media, writing, objects, and digital work, provides an exploration of mobility, as well as the experience of massive displacement and dislocation of the island. She writes that : "In my work, I explore ideas about life and mobility. As we travel to new places, we become hybrids. I comment on this state of flux by working with radically different media, blurring the borderlines of art categories from painting and collage, to sewing, to writing and digital art." Much of her work concentrates on the changing of Puerto Rico, and the evolution of national and international citizens in the current world purview. She explains that "my work also explores themes related to the nature of hybridism and the shifting identities of the transnational citizen." It also explores images and artistic practices emerging from migratory histories, as well as from the dissolution of community and the reconstruction of culture in the floating societies. Emma Hill explains that "other artists have retold the stories of their own family histories, translating narratives into poignant sculptural objects. Soraya Marcano's tiny paper boats in Exile are examples of the many 'books' that tell of memory and the specificity of place, without words, but in forms that are full of poetic potential."

== Publications ==
- 2012 "Mobility and Art," Southern Connecticut State University Women's Studies Program.
- 2011 “Spanish Caribbean: Liquid Identities.” Island Songs: A Global Repertoire, Scarecrow Press 19-36.
- 2010 “From depopulation, to repopulation, to mass migration: images of mobility.” Southeastern College Art Conference Abstracts
- 1996 “Libros de Arte Latinoamericanos” Noticias de arte

== Artist in residence ==
- 2001 The Julia and David White Colony, Costa Rica
- 1999 Jamaica Center for Arts & Learning, New York
- 1999 Brooklyn Community Access Television and the Rotunda Gallery, Brooklyn, New York
- 1998 Altos de Chavon Foundation and School of Design, Dominican Republic, in affiliation with Parsons School of Design
- 1997 Millay Colony, New York
- 1992 International Encounter of Art, National Autonomous University of Mexico, Mexico

== Public collections ==
- Museum of Majdanek, Lublin, Poland;
- Museum of Contemporary Art of Chamalieres, France;
- Institute of Puerto Rican Culture, Puerto Rico;
- Centro Cultural Altos de Chavon, Dominican Republic;
- Pratt Institute Collection, New York;
- Center for the Humanities, The New York Public Library, New York;
- Museo la casa del Libro, Puerto Rico;
- Panamanian Collection, University of Panama;
- George H Waterman III Library, New York;
- Rockefeller Library, Brown University, Rhode Island;
- The Julia and David White Colony, Costa Rica.
