= Honduras, Cidra, Puerto Rico =

Barrio of Puerto Rico

Honduras
- Barrio
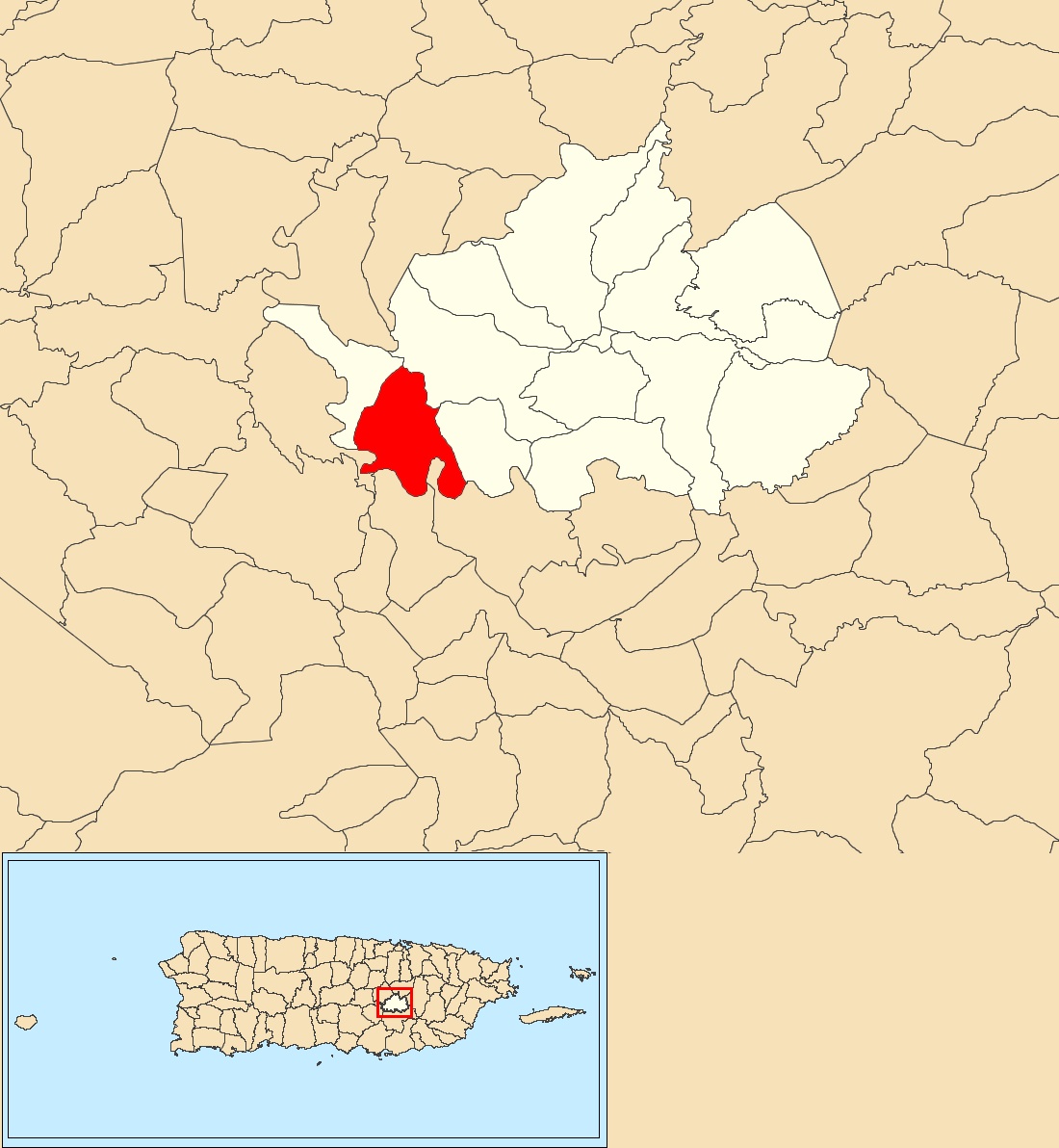
- Location of Honduras within the municipality of Cidra shown in red

- Location of Puerto Rico
- Coordinates: 18°09′07″N 66°12′32″W
- Commonwealth: Puerto Rico
- Municipality: Cidra

Area
  - Total: 2.22 sq mi (5.7 km^{2})
  - Land: 2.22 sq mi (5.7 km^{2})
  - Water: 0 sq mi (0 km^{2})
- Elevation: 1,863 ft (568 m)

Population (2010)
  - Total: 1,705
  - Density: 768/sq mi (297/km^{2})
- Source: 2010 Census
- Time zone: UTC−4 (AST)
- ZIP Code: 00739
- Area code: 787/939

Honduras is a barrio in the municipality of Cidra, Puerto Rico. Its population in 2010 was 1,705.

== History ==
Honduras was in Spain's gazetteers until Puerto Rico was ceded by Spain in the aftermath of the Spanish–American War under the terms of the Treaty of Paris of 1898 and became an unincorporated territory of the United States. In 1899, the United States Department of War conducted a census of Puerto Rico finding that the combined population of Honduras and Toíta barrios was 800.

Historical population
Census	Pop.	Note	%±
1910	851		—
1920	889		4.5%
1930	575		−35.3%
1940	683		18.8%
1950	652		−4.5%
1960	671		2.9%
1970	1,019		51.9%
1980	1,350		32.5%
1990	1,110		−17.8%
2000	1,738		56.6%
2010	1,705		−1.9%
U.S. Decennial Census; 1900 (N/A) 1910-1930; 1930-1950 1980-2000 2010

== Sectors ==
In contemporary times, barrios are roughly comparable to minor civil divisions). These barriors are further subdivided into smaller local areas or units called sectores (sectors in English). The types of sectores can vary, from normal sector to urbanización to reparto to barriada to residencial, among others.

The following sectors are in Honduras barrio:

Bernard, Caña, Díaz, El Malecón, Galindo, La Loma, Muñiz, Polo Torres, Puente Blanco, and San José.

== See also ==
- List of communities in Puerto Rico
- List of barrios and sectors of Cidra, Puerto Rico
