= Ceiba, Cidra, Puerto Rico =

Barrio of Puerto Rico

Ceiba
- Barrio
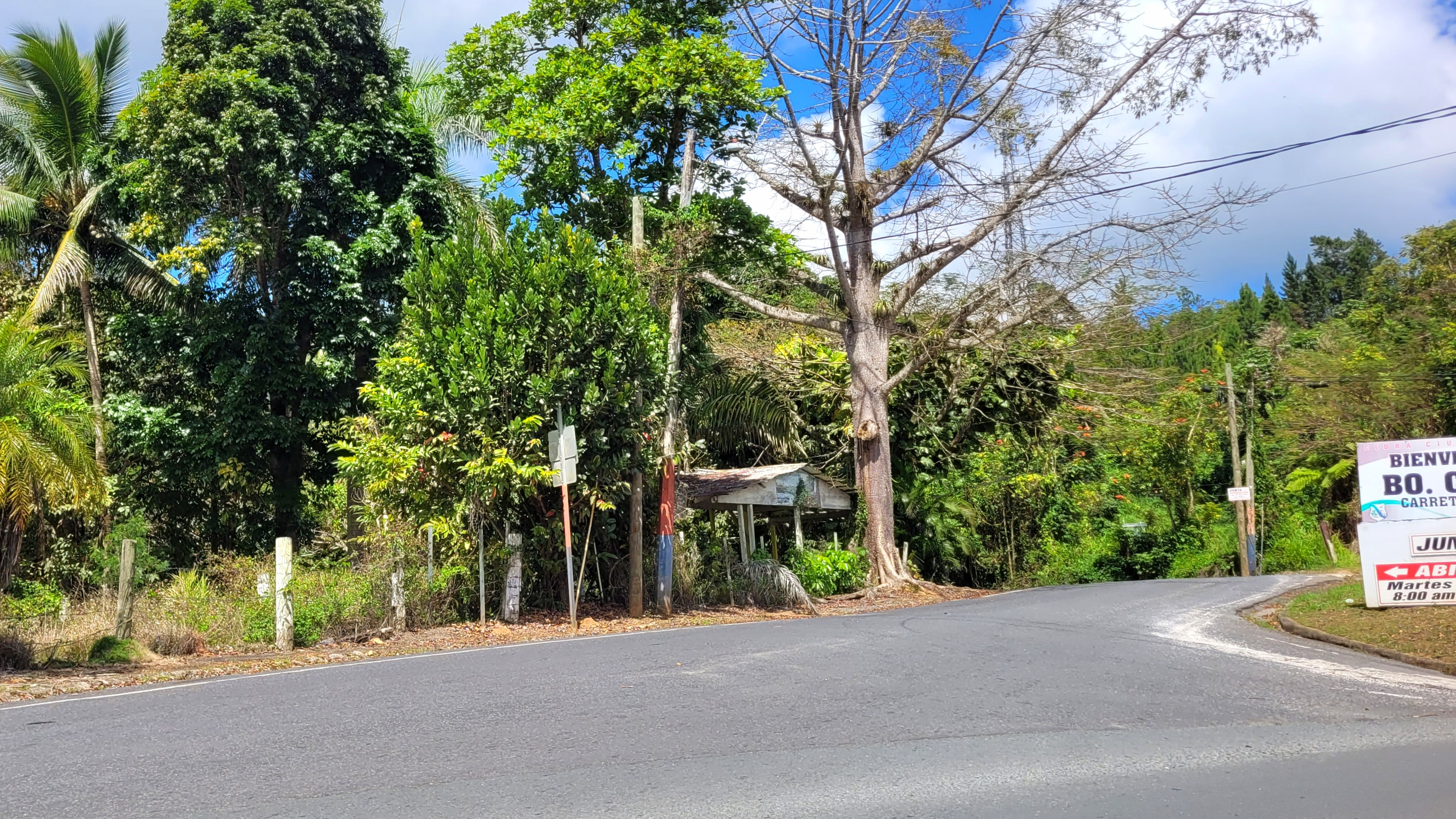
- Puerto Rico Highway 782 between Monte Llano and Ceiba

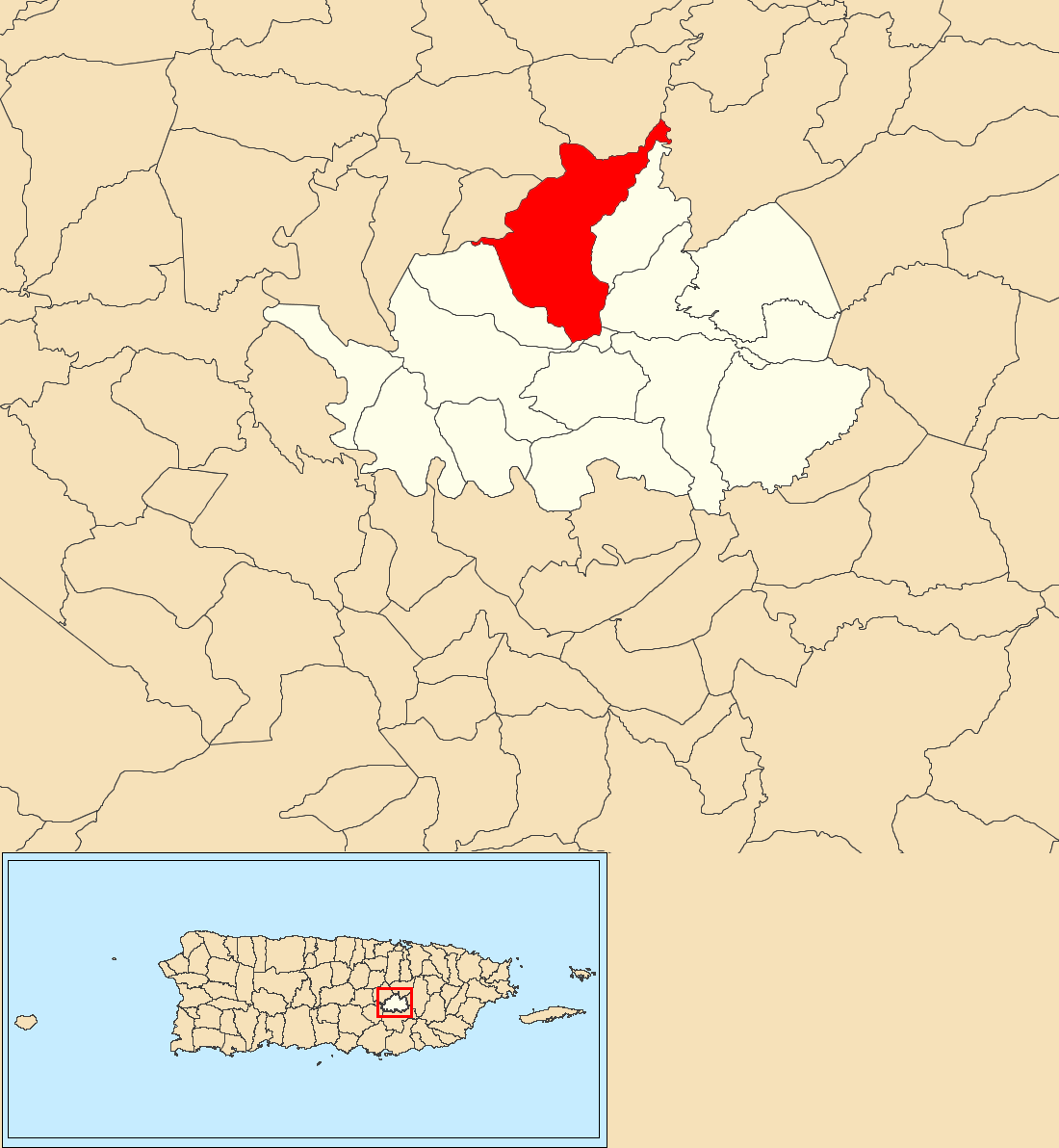
- Location of Ceiba within the municipality of Cidra shown in red

- Location of Puerto Rico
- Coordinates: 18°12′06″N 66°10′09″W
- Commonwealth: Puerto Rico
- Municipality: Cidra

Area
  - Total: 4.44 sq mi (11.5 km^{2})
  - Land: 4.44 sq mi (11.5 km^{2})
  - Water: 0 sq mi (0 km^{2})
- Elevation: 1,742 ft (531 m)

Population (2010)
  - Total: 3,850
  - Density: 867.1/sq mi (334.8/km^{2})
- Source: 2010 Census
- Time zone: UTC−4 (AST)
- ZIP Code: 00739
- Area code: 787/939

Ceiba is a barrio in the municipality of Cidra, Puerto Rico. Its population in 2010 was 3,850.

== History ==
Ceiba was in Spain's gazetteers until Puerto Rico was ceded by Spain in the aftermath of the Spanish–American War under the terms of the Treaty of Paris of 1898 and became an unincorporated territory of the United States. In 1899, the United States Department of War conducted a census of Puerto Rico finding that the population of Ceiba barrio and Río Abajo barrio was 1,100.

Historical population
Census	Pop.	Note	%±
1910	820		—
1920	1,282		56.3%
1930	1,802		40.6%
1940	1,725		−4.3%
1950	2,085		20.9%
1960	2,558		22.7%
1970	0		−100.0%
1980	2,878		—
1990	3,434		19.3%
2000	3,825		11.4%
2010	3,850		0.7%
U.S. Decennial Census; 1899 (shown as 1900) 1910-1930; 1930-1950 1980-2000 2010

== Sectors ==
Barrios (which are, in contemporary times, roughly comparable to minor civil divisions) in turn are further subdivided into smaller local populated place areas/units called sectores (sectors in English). The types of sectores may vary, from normally sector to urbanización to reparto to barriada to residencial, among others.

The following sectors are in Ceiba barrio:

Comunidad Naranjo, El Verde I, Finca Tommy Muñiz, Parcelas Hevia, Sector Agustín Cruz Ojeda, Sector Agustín Santos, Sector Carrasquillo (Sector González), Sector Delgado (El Llano), Sector Escalera, Sector Euclides Rivera, Sector Falcón, Sector Flores, Sector Garced, Sector Jacinto Hernández, Sector Joya Abajo, Sector La Frontera, Sector Las Paletas, Sector Meléndez, Sector Pablo Santos, Sector Peregín Santos, Sector Rafi Ruiz, Sector Ruiz, and Urbanización Estancias de Monte Río.

In Ceiba barrio is the Rodríguez Hevia urban zone and part of the Cidra urban zone.

== See also ==
- List of communities in Puerto Rico
- List of barrios and sectors of Cidra, Puerto Rico
