= Rabanal, Cidra, Puerto Rico =

Barrio of Puerto Rico

Rabanal
- Barrio
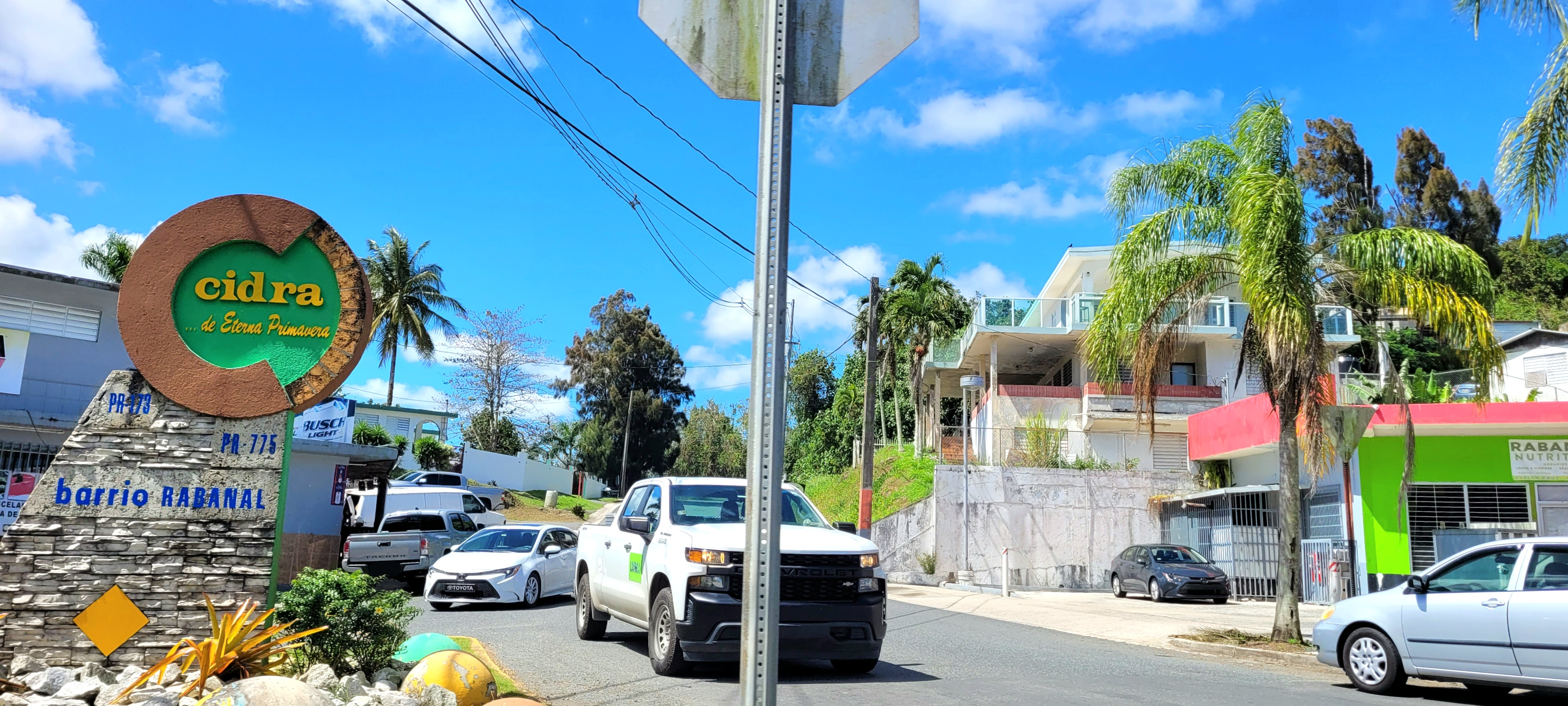
- Puerto Rico Highway 775 in Rabanal

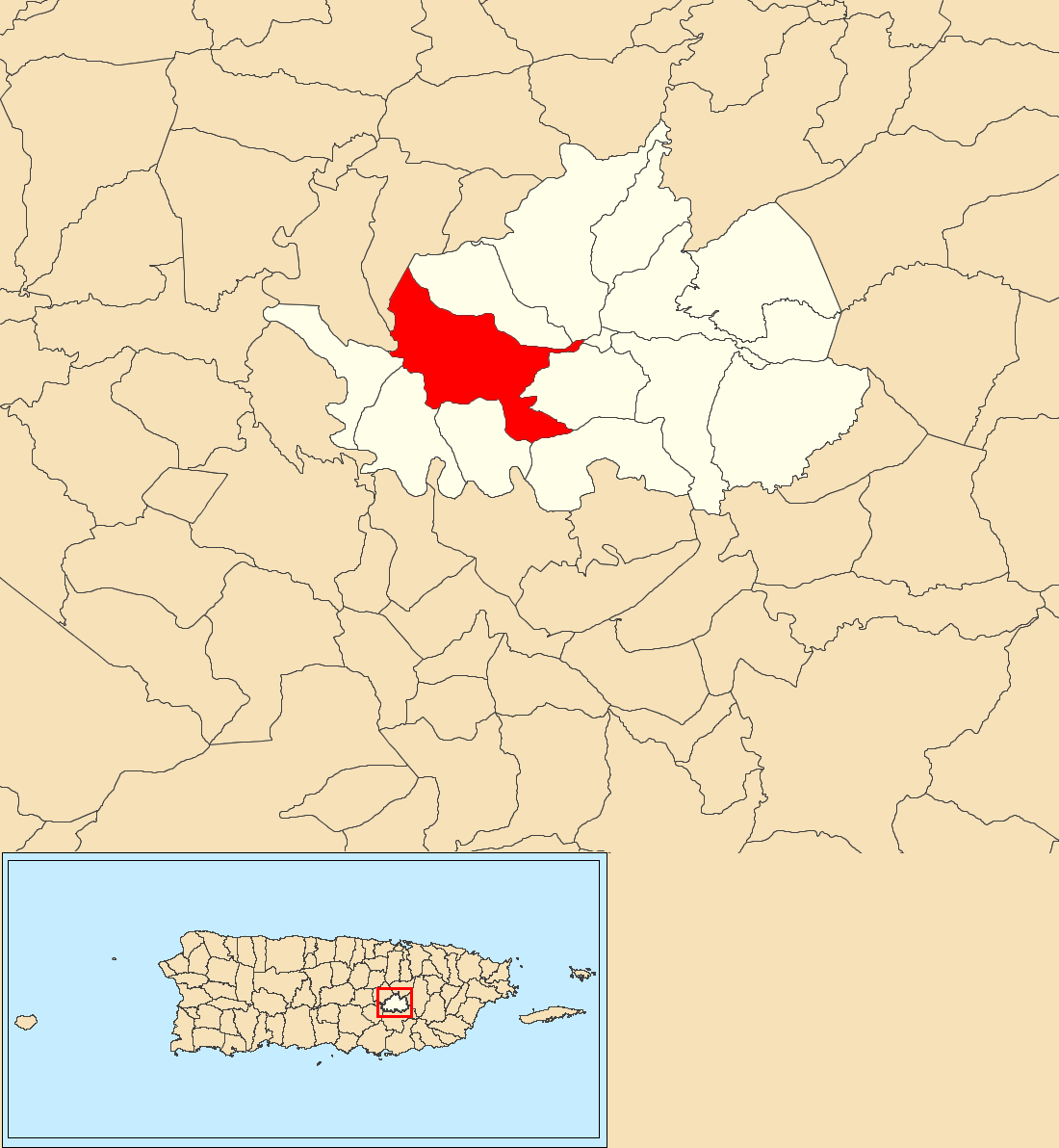
- Location of Rabanal within the municipality of Cidra shown in red

- Location of Puerto Rico
- Coordinates: 18°10′28″N 66°11′57″W
- Commonwealth: Puerto Rico
- Municipality: Cidra

Area
  - Total: 3.77 sq mi (9.8 km^{2})
  - Land: 3.77 sq mi (9.8 km^{2})
  - Water: 0 sq mi (0 km^{2})
- Elevation: 1,775 ft (541 m)

Population (2010)
  - Total: 4,228
  - Density: 1,121.5/sq mi (433.0/km^{2})
- Source: 2010 Census
- Time zone: UTC−4 (AST)
- ZIP Code: 00739
- Area code: 787/939

Rabanal is a barrio in the municipality of Cidra, Puerto Rico. Its population in 2010 was 4,228.

== History ==
Rabanal was in Spain's gazetteers until Puerto Rico was ceded by Spain in the aftermath of the Spanish–American War under the terms of the Treaty of Paris of 1898 and became an unincorporated territory of the United States. In 1899, the United States Department of War conducted a census of Puerto Rico finding that the combined population of Rabanal and Salto barrios was 1,498.

Historical population
Census	Pop.	Note	%±
1910	1,413		—
1920	1,744		23.4%
1930	2,177		24.8%
1940	1,858		−14.7%
1950	1,792		−3.6%
1960	1,353		−24.5%
1970	0		−100.0%
1980	2,272		—
1990	3,409		50.0%
2000	4,277		25.5%
2010	4,228		−1.1%
U.S. Decennial Census; 1900 (N/A) 1910-1930; 1930-1950 1980-2000 2010

== Sectors ==
Barrios (which are, in contemporary times, roughly comparable to minor civil divisions) in turn are further subdivided into smaller local populated place areas/units called sectores (sectors in English). The types of sectores may vary, from normally sector to urbanización to reparto to barriada to residencial, among others.

The following sectors are in Rabanal barrio:

=== Rabanal Norte ===
Almirante, Comunidades Unidas, Cortés, Finca Alicea, Flores de la Riviera o Las Flores, Haciendas de Cidra o El Banco, Jardines de Rabanal, Jardines de la Cumbre, La Milagrosa, Las Jaguas, Mejías, and Meléndez.

=== Rabanal Sur ===
Alejandro, Alturas de Cidra, Borrero, Colinas de Buenos Aires, Diego Rivera, El Buen Pastor, El Paraíso, Fátima, Jolujo, Jiménez o Loma de los Jiménez, La Cumbre, La Loma, La Pastora, Lomas de Rabanal, Los Bravos, Los Dos Mangoes, Los Panes, Malavé, Millo Reyes, Monseñor Ignacio González, Piñeiro, San José, Tierra Linda, and Tres y Medio (3½).

In Rabanal is Parcelas La Milagrosa comunidad and part of the Cidra urban zone.

== See also ==
- List of communities in Puerto Rico
- List of barrios and sectors of Cidra, Puerto Rico
