= Cidra barrio-pueblo =

Historical and administrative center (seat) of Cidra, Puerto Rico

Cidra barrio-pueblo Pueblo de Cidra
- Municipality Seat
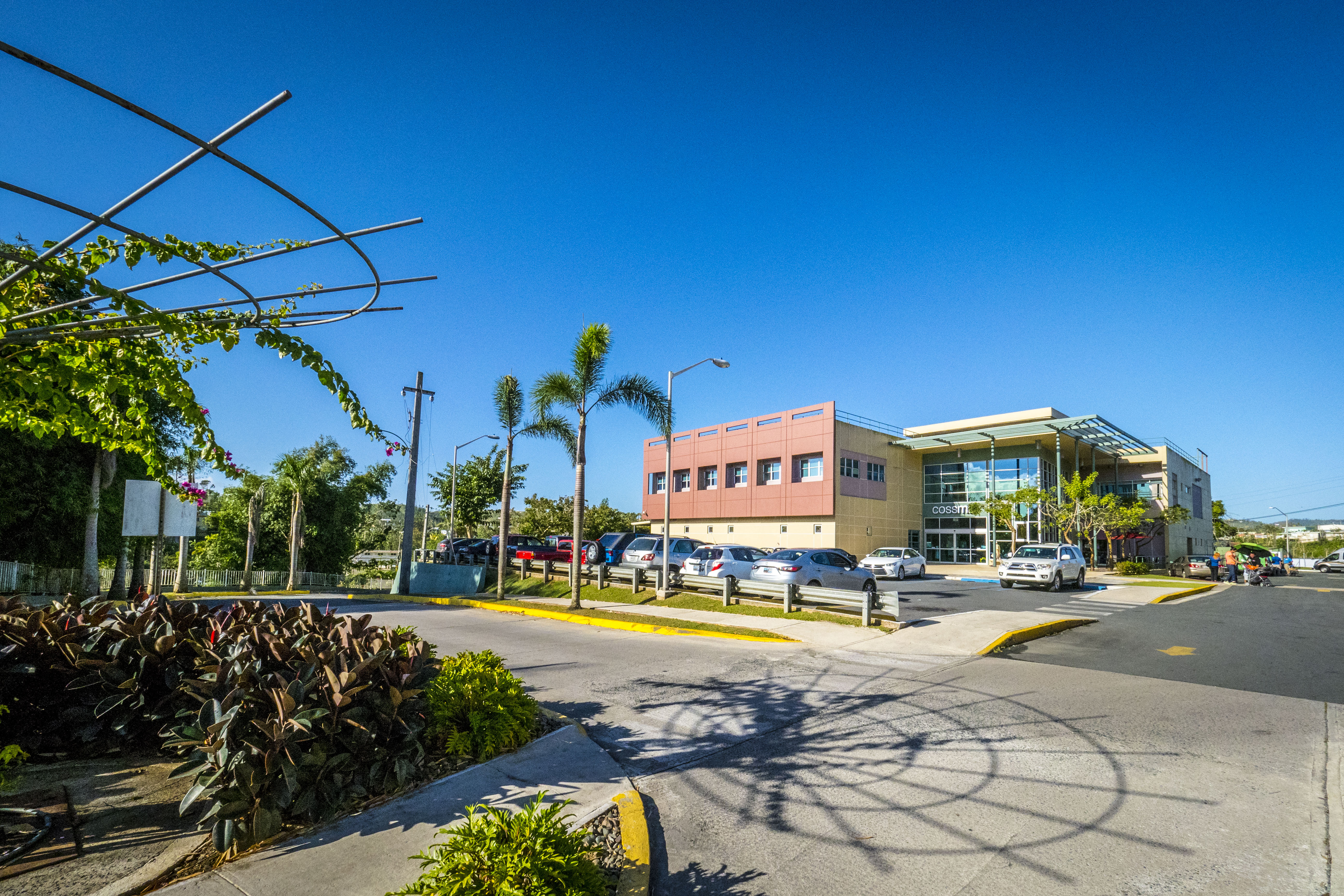
- Health facility in Cidra barrio-pueblo

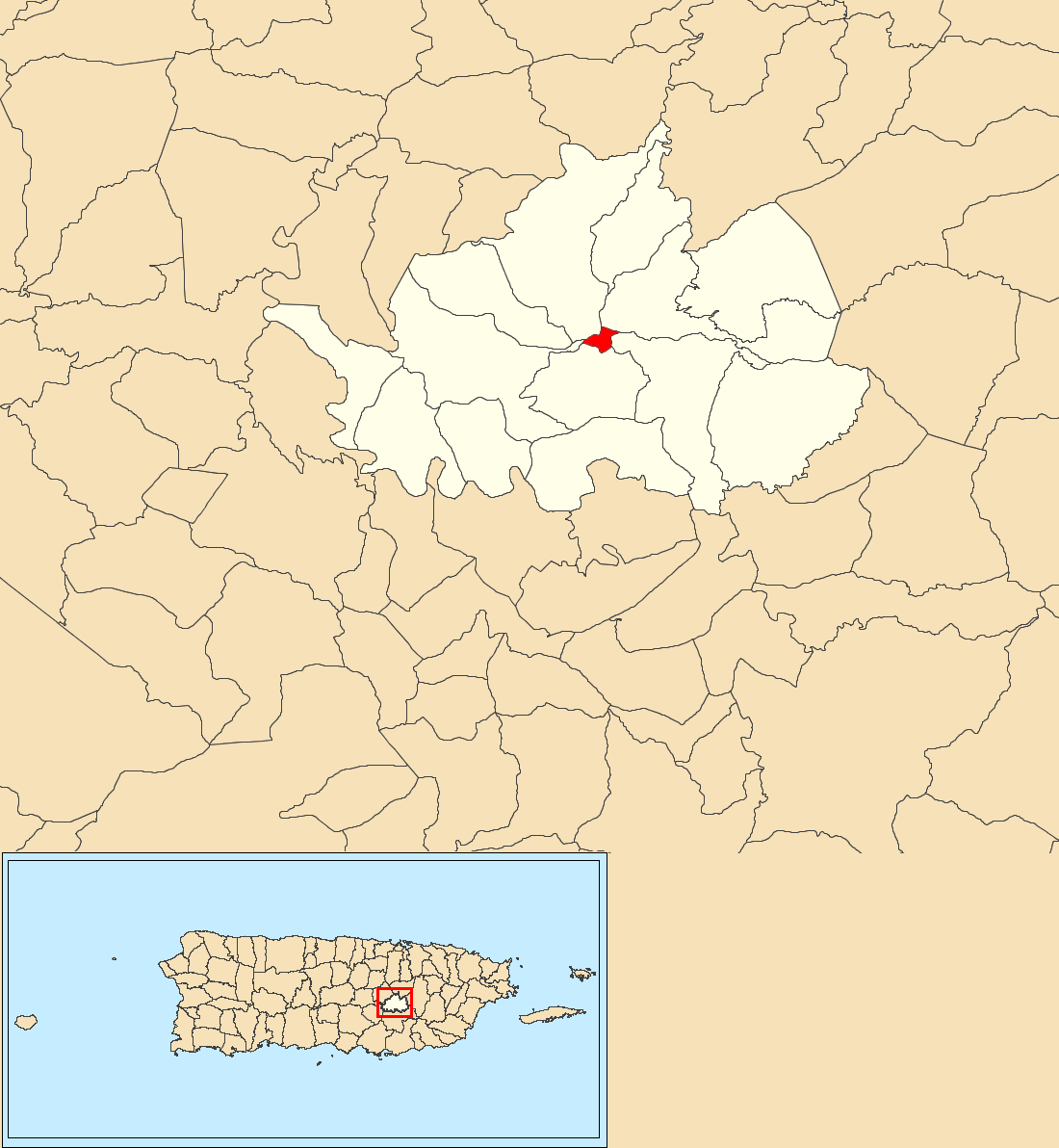
- Location of Cidra barrio-pueblo within the municipality of Cidra shown in red

- Location of Puerto Rico
- Coordinates: 18°10′33″N 66°09′39″W
- Commonwealth: Puerto Rico
- Municipality: Cidra

Area
  - Total: 0.11 sq mi (0.28 km^{2})
  - Land: 0.11 sq mi (0.28 km^{2})
  - Water: 0 sq mi (0 km^{2})
- Elevation: 1,401 ft (427 m)

Population (2010)
  - Total: 1,064
  - Density: 9,672.7/sq mi (3,734.7/km^{2})
- Source: 2010 Census
- Time zone: UTC−4 (AST)
- ZIP Code: 00739
- Area code: 787/939

Cidra barrio-pueblo is a barrio and the administrative center (seat) of Cidra, a municipality of Puerto Rico. Its population in 2010 was 1,064.

As was customary in Spain, in Puerto Rico, the municipality has a barrio called pueblo which contains a central plaza, the municipal buildings (city hall), and a Catholic church. Fiestas patronales (patron saint festivals) are held in the central plaza every year.

== History ==
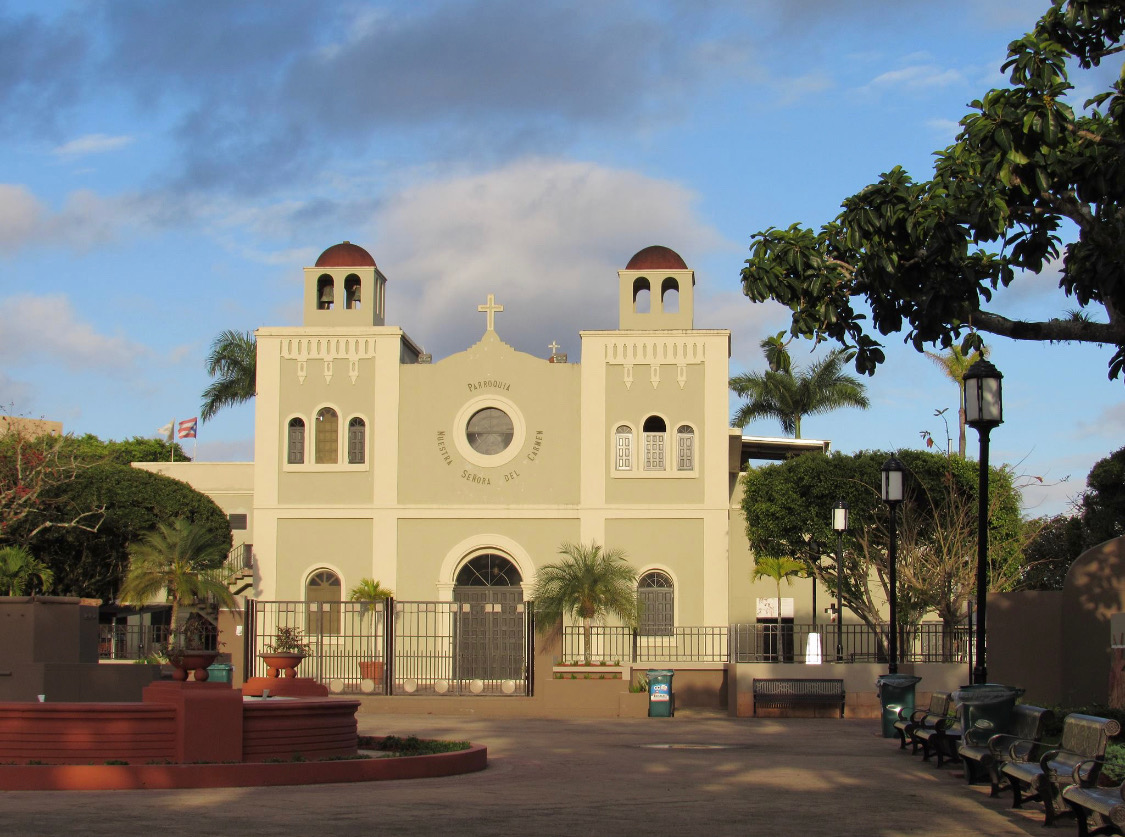
Nuestra Señora del Carmen Church in the main town square or plaza of Cidra.

Cidra barrio-pueblo was in Spain's gazetteers until Puerto Rico was ceded by Spain in the aftermath of the Spanish–American War under the terms of the Treaty of Paris of 1898 and became an unincorporated territory of the United States. In 1899, the United States Department of War conducted a census of Puerto Rico finding that the population of Cidra Pueblo was 1,034.

Historical population
Census	Pop.	Note	%±
1900	1,034		—
1910	1,535		48.5%
1920	1,696		10.5%
1930	2,170		27.9%
1940	2,563		18.1%
1950	3,146		22.7%
1960	3,191		1.4%
1970	6,306		97.6%
1980	1,670		−73.5%
1990	1,428		−14.5%
2000	1,382		−3.2%
2010	1,064		−23.0%
U.S. Decennial Census; 1899 (shown as 1900) 1910-1930; 1930-1950 1960-1970 1980-2000 2010

== The central plaza and its church ==
The central plaza, or square, is a place for official and unofficial recreational events and a place where people can gather and socialize from dusk to dawn. The Laws of the Indies, Spanish law, which regulated life in Puerto Rico in the early 19th century, stated the plaza's purpose was for "the parties" (celebrations, festivities) (Spanish: a propósito para las fiestas), and that the square should be proportionally large enough for the number of neighbors (Spanish: grandeza proporcionada al número de vecinos). These Spanish regulations also stated that the streets nearby should be comfortable portals for passersby, protecting them from the elements: sun and rain.

Located across from the central plaza is the Parroquia Nuestra Señora del Carmen (English: Our Lady of Mount Carmel Parish), a Roman Catholic church. The first church made of wood was built in 1815. In 1867, a second church was built but was destroyed by an earthquake soon after. Pedro Cobreros designed the next church which was built in 1895. The current structure with a new facade was completed in 1952 and the lateral naves were added at that time.

== Sectors ==
Barrios (which are, in contemporary times, roughly comparable to minor civil divisions) in turn are further subdivided into smaller local populated place areas/units called sectores (sectors in English). The types of sectores may vary, from normally sector to urbanización to reparto to barriada to residencial, among others.

The following sectors are in Cidra barrio-pueblo:

Barriada Ferrer, Domingo Rodríguez, El Cielito, Fernández, Ferrer, Freire, Jardines de Cidra, La Cuatro, Los Almendros, Práxedes Santiago, Samuel Quiles, Santa Teresita, and Villa del Carmen.

== See also ==
- List of communities in Puerto Rico
- List of barrios and sectors of Cidra, Puerto Rico
