= Antonio Torres Pérez =

Puerto Rican comedian

Antonio Torres Rodriguez
- Born: 1945 (age 80–81); Cidra, Puerto Rico
- Occupation: comedian
- Spouse: Carmen Ramos

Antonio Torres Rodriguez born in Cidra, Puerto Rico is a Puerto Rican comedian better known as Pancholo. He has also worked as an animator, writer, and producer.

== Career ==
The beginnings in show-business of Antonio Torres Pérez, known in the artistic slang as "Pancholo", go back to 1961, when the Cuban Organizer Osvaldo Agüero provided him the opportunity to act permanently in his "Festival of nudges" show that the old channel 11, the child company of Telecadena Pérez Perry. His first creation was 'Pepe Bolillo' character, who is identified with the phrase "which sentences check them in his pocket". Torres and Cuban comedian Abel Barrios created the couple known as Pancholo y Bachiller maintaining a segment in El Show del Mediodía in which they commented on political and social developments abroad for 1968.

Because of the popularity he had in the 70's Antonio Torres and got an offer from Telemundo producer Paquito Cordero to work on "El Show de las Doce" this time to work with José Fuentes in a segment called "Pancholo y Pepe".

In the mid 80's Torres went to work for Luisito Vigoreaux in WAPA-TV on a game-show known as "Parejo, Doble y Triple".

For many years Antonio Torres hosted the Fiestas Patronales in his native town Cidra, Puerto Rico.

With the arrival of the year 2000, Torres returned to the stage as a producer and actor in the play "El hospitalillo", with Marvin Santiago, Cucho Viera, René Rubiela and Estrellita Cruz performed in it.

== Later years ==
In October 2002, the creator of "Pancholo" suffered a stroke which caused paralysis to the left side of his body. At that time he expressed his gratitude to people who had helped him in his career such as Luisito Vigoreaux, Joaquín Monserrat "pacheco" and Héctor Marcano.

Antonio Torres Rodriguez retired from the entertainment business to take care of his health and spend time with his wife Carmen Ramos, his children and grandchildren.
