= Cidra, Puerto Rico =

Town and municipality in Puerto Rico

Cidra Municipio Autónomo de Cidra
- Town and Municipality
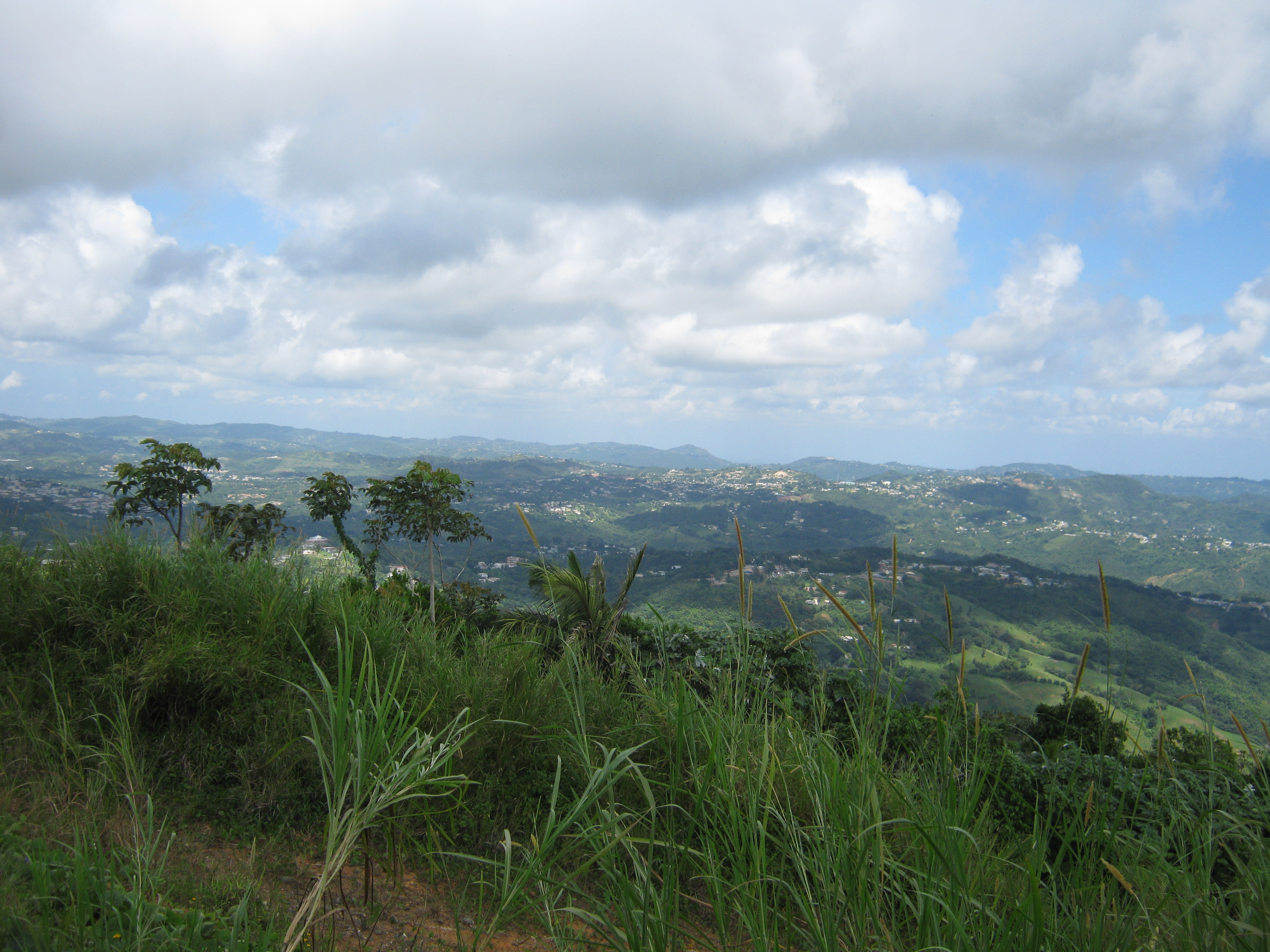

- Flag Coat of arms
- Nicknames: "La Ciudad de la Eterna Primavera" (City of Eternal Spring), "El Pueblo de la Paloma Sabanera"
- Anthem: "Del corazón de Puerto Rico nació Cidra"
- Map of Puerto Rico highlighting Cidra Municipality
- Coordinates: 18°10′33″N 66°09′41″W
- Sovereign state: United States
- Commonwealth: Puerto Rico
- Settled: 1795
- Founded: October 1, 1809
- Founder: Bibiana Vázquez
- Barrios: 14 barrios: Arenas; Bayamón; Beatriz; Ceiba; Certenejas; Cidra barrio-pueblo; Honduras; Monte Llano; Rabanal; Rincón; Río Abajo; Salto; Sud; Toíta

Government
  - Mayor: Delvis J. Pagán Clavijo
  - Senatorial dist.: 6 - Guayama
  - Representative dist.: 29

Area
  - Total: 36.46 sq mi (94.42 km^{2})
  - Land: 36 sq mi (94 km^{2})
  - Water: 0.16 sq mi (.42 km^{2})

Population (2020)
  - Total: 39,970
  - Estimate (2025): 39,669 ▼
  - Rank: 22nd in Puerto Rico
  - Density: 1,100/sq mi (430/km^{2})
- Demonym: Cidreños
- Time zone: UTC-4 (AST)
- ZIP Code: 00739
- Area code: 787/939
- FIPS code: 72-18074
- GNIS feature ID: 1610092

Cidra (Spanish pronunciation: [ˈsiðɾa]) is a town and municipality of Puerto Rico located in the central region of the island, north of Cayey; south of Comerío and Aguas Buenas; east of Aibonito and Barranquitas; and west of Caguas. Cidra is spread over 13 barrios and Cidra Pueblo (the downtown area and the administrative center of the city). It is part of the San Juan-Caguas-Guaynabo Metropolitan Statistical Area.

Cidra is known as "El Pueblo de la Eterna Primavera" ("Town of the Eternal Spring") and "El Pueblo de la Paloma Sabanera" ("Town of the Plain Pigeon").

== History ==
The region of what is now Cidra belonged to the Taíno region of Cubuy, which covered a portion of the center of Puerto Rico. The region was led by cacique Caguax.

There are not many records that show that the region was populated after the Spanish colonization. However, it is believed that around 1795, a Catalan named Frujols built a hermitage or shrine around which a small village settled. The settlement became a ward of Cayey, until 1807 when the residents gave the power to Victoriano de Rivera to ask the Governor for permission to found an independent town. In 1809, a landowner known as Bibiana Vázquez donated the land needed for the foundation, and Governor Salvador Meléndez Bruna approved the petition. Victoriano de Rivera was appointed to lead the town, but he was quickly replaced by Wenceslao Vázquez due to illness.

At the time of its foundation, Cidra had 26 houses and 11 huts. It is believed that its name is derived from the citron fruit which was widely cultivated in the region. During the years following its foundation, a church and city hall were built. By 1822, there were already two public schools in town. Two years later, a road communicating the town with Caguas was opened. In 1868, the population of Cidra was more than 5,000 residents, which included European immigrants and slaves.

Puerto Rico was ceded by Spain in the aftermath of the Spanish–American War under the terms of the Treaty of Paris of 1898 and became a territory of the United States. In 1899, the United States conducted its first census of Puerto Rico finding that the population of Cidra was 7,552.

In 1902, the Legislative Assembly of Puerto Rico approved a law for the consolidation of certain municipalities. As a result, Cidra was again incorporated to the town of Cayey. However, in 1905 a new law revoked the previous one, turning Cidra into an independent municipality again.

=== Hurricane Maria ===
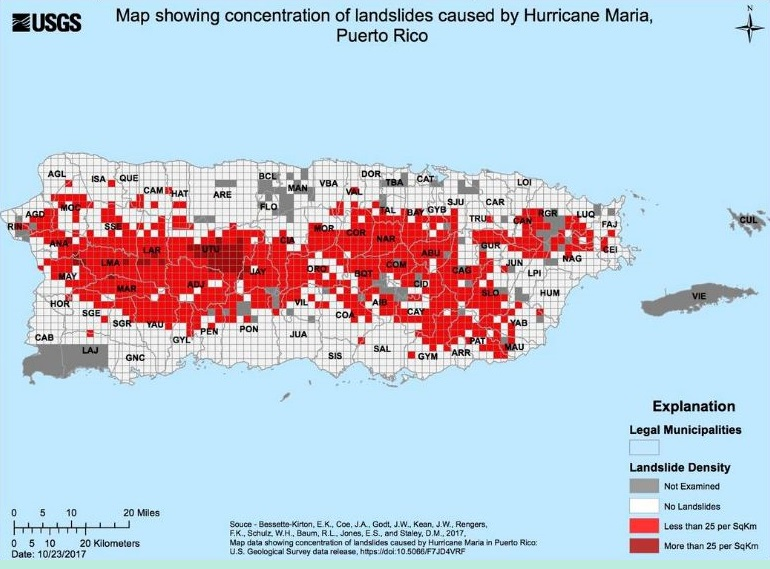
Much of Cidra suffered landslides

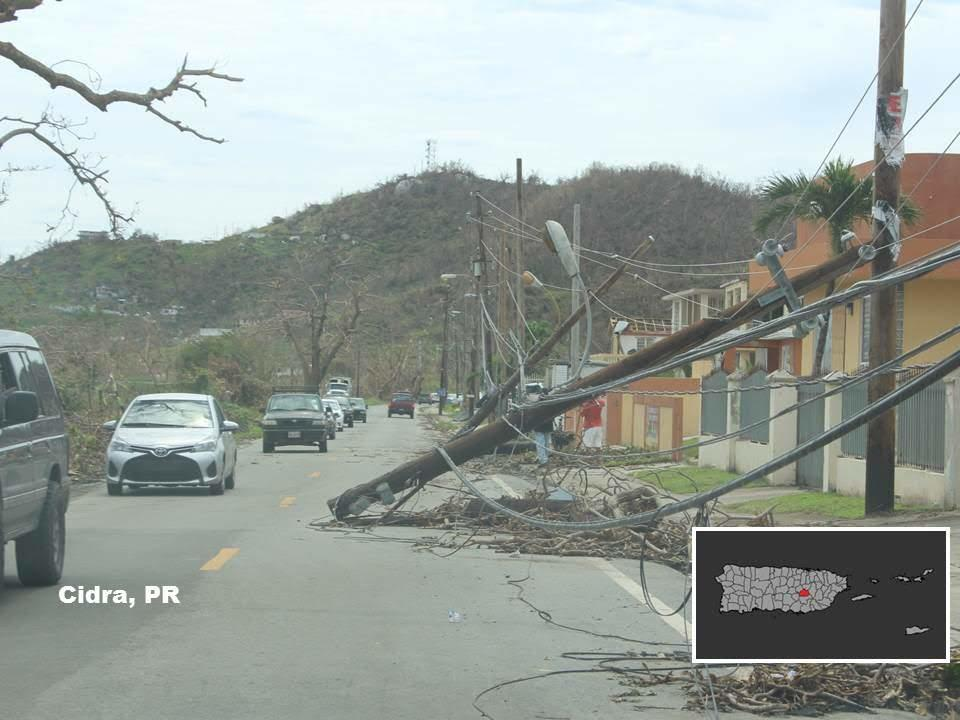
Downed power line in Cidra after Hurricane Maria

A category 5, and high-end category 4 Hurricane Maria when it hit Puerto Rico, on September 20, 2017 triggered numerous landslides in Cidra. A week before Hurricane Irma, another category 5 had passed over Puerto Rico causing some damage. With Hurricane María, some areas of Cidra experienced more than 25 landslides per kilometer. Citizens, with machetes in hand, worked to clear the roadways of debri after the hurricane hit, especially in Rabanal, Arena and Ceiba, barrios of Cidra located at high altitudes. 1500 homes were left without a roof and many would never receive funds for repairs. One local (analog) radio antenna survived the catastrophe allowing for some communication within the town to take place. Before the hurricane there had been plans to eliminate the radio tower, but when 92.7% of Puerto Rico's towers were destroyed by the hurricane, plans to eliminate the analog radio tower were scrapped. Puerto Rico Highway 172, the main highway into Cidra from the San Juan area had to remain closed for repairs for five months. It was not until six months after the hurricane struck that power was restored to Cidra.

== Geography ==
Cidra is located at the top of a hill in the eastern part of the Cordillera Central. It is bordered by the municipalities of Aguas Buenas, Caguas, Cayey, Aibonito, and Comerío. Cidra is a small municipality, covering only 36.1 square miles (94 km^{2}). At 2,244.2 feet (684 m) of elevation, the highest point of the municipality is Cerro Viento Caliente, located on the municipal boundary with Comerío.

=== Water features ===
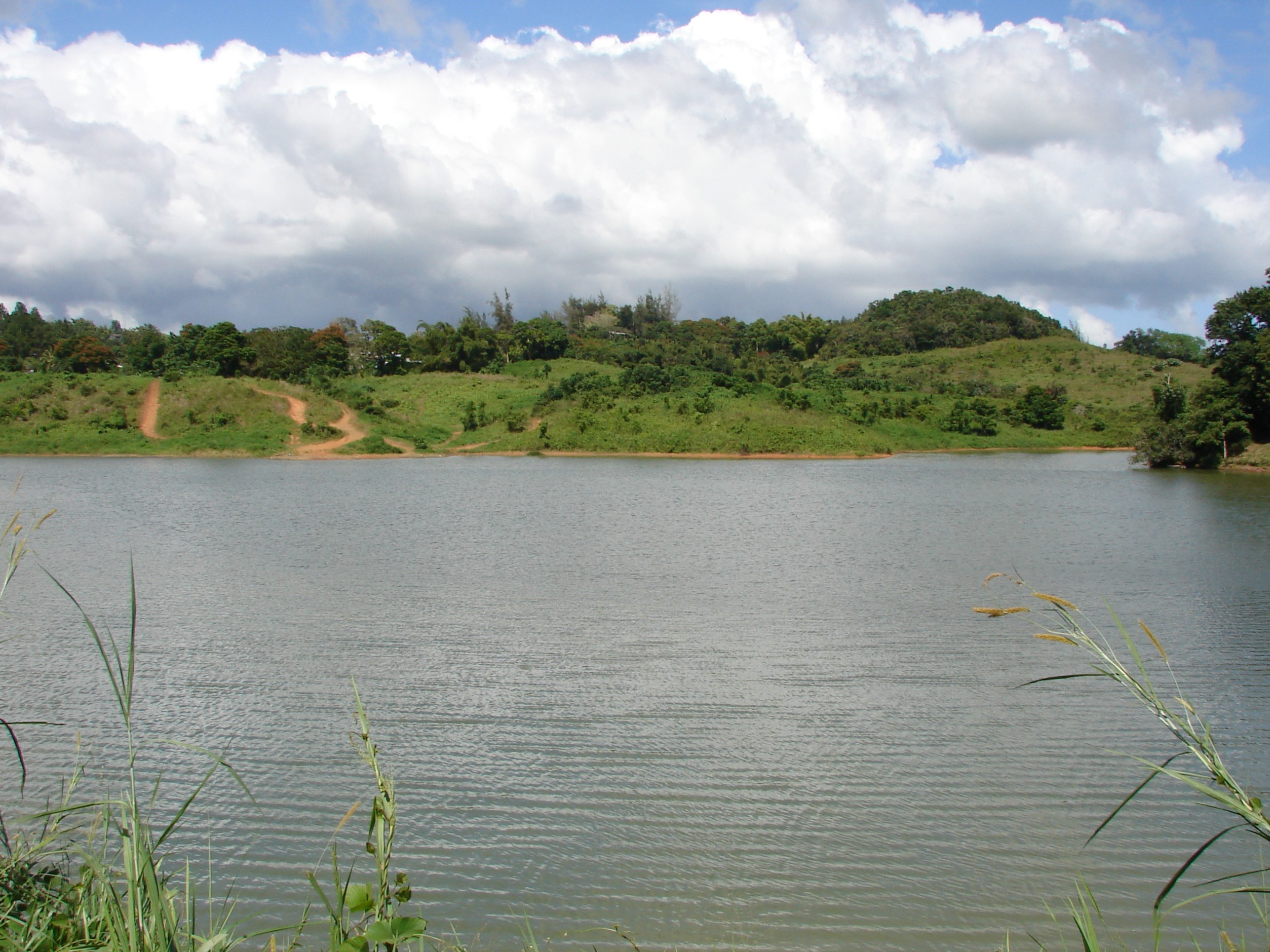
Lago de Cidra

Cidra's hydrographic system consists mainly of Lago de Cidra reservoir, located in the municipality. The reservoir, which was built in 1946, provides water to several areas in the island. There are also several rivers and creeks that cross the town like Arroyata, Bayamón, and Río de la Plata.

=== Fauna ===
The town is known for being the nesting place of the paloma sabanera (a subspecies of the plains pigeon). The bird, which is at risk of extinction, is currently found mostly in the municipality of Cidra and other nearby municipalities. In addition, there is various species of fish residing in the Lago de Cidra, as well as iguanas which have been introduced into the surrounding the area and are now considered an invasive species.

=== Barrios ===
Like all municipalities of Puerto Rico, Cidra is subdivided into barrios. The municipal buildings, central square and large Catholic church are located in a small barrio referred to as "el pueblo", near the center of the municipality.

1. Arenas
2. Bayamón
3. Beatriz
4. Ceiba
5. Certenejas
6. Cidra barrio-pueblo
7. Honduras
8. Monte Llano
9. Rabanal
10. Rincón
11. Río Abajo
12. Salto
13. Sud
14. Toíta

=== Sectors ===
Barrios (which are, in contemporary times, roughly comparable to minor civil divisions) are further subdivided into smaller areas called sectores (sectors in English). The types of sectores may vary, from normally sector to urbanización to reparto to barriada to residencial, among others.

=== Special Communities ===
Comunidades Especiales de Puerto Rico (Special Communities of Puerto Rico) are marginalized communities whose citizens are experiencing a certain amount of social exclusion. A map shows these communities occur in nearly every municipality of the commonwealth. Of the 742 places that were on the list in 2014, the following barrios, communities, sectors, or neighborhoods were in Cidra: Barriada Ferrer, Candela, Comunidad San José (Laberinto), La Línea, La Milagrosa, Río Abajo, and Santa Teresita.

== Places of interest ==
Although Cidra is not known as a tourist main stop, it has some attractions. The town center features historic places like the Parroquia Nuestra Señora del Carmen church and the Iberia Theater, both built during the first half of the 20th century.

On the outskirts of the town, there is Lake Cidra and Perico's Waterfalls. Frog's Rock and Hamacas Bridge are also landmarks visited by tourists.

The renovation of el Parque del Niño (children's park), which includes water features and a skatepark was completed in 2019.

To stimulate local tourism, the Puerto Rico Tourism Company launched the Voy Turistiendo ("I'm Touring") campaign, with a passport book and website. The Cidra page lists Destilería Club Caribe, Mirador del Lago de Cidra, and Parque del Niño, as places of interest.

== Economy ==
The economy of Cidra has relied mostly on agriculture, particularly coffee, tobacco, and minor fruits. Cattle ranching is also a source of economy in the town. In recent years, pharmaceutical and clothing industries have become participants of the economy of Cidra.

== Culture ==
=== Festivals and events ===
Cidra celebrates its patron saint festival in July. The Fiestas Patronales de Nuestra Sra. del Carmen is a religious and cultural celebration that generally features parades, games, artisans, amusement rides, regional food, and live entertainment.

A number of cultural events take place during the year, most prominently:

- Myrna Vázquez Week - held in February
- Paloma Sabanera Festival - held in early December

=== Religion ===
There are a number of churches and chapels from several denominations in Cidra. The main Catholic parish, Parroquia Nuestra Señora del Carmen, was established in 1813. The original structure was destroyed by earthquakes in the 1860s, but completely rebuilt by 1952. Cidra's patron saint is the Virgin Mary. Its festivities are held each July.

Also in front of the town square is the First Baptist Church, which was established by missionary Edgar Humphrey in 1903. The original wood structure was destroyed in 1928 by San Felipe Hurricane, but rebuilt in concrete, wood, and zinc.

=== Sports ===
Cidra doesn't have a professional sports team, however, they have a successful amateur team, Bravos de Cidra, that participate in the Puerto Rican Amateur Baseball Federation. The Bravos team has won nine championships, and as of 2014, are en route to win their third consecutive one. The main baseball facility is the Jesús María Freire Stadium, where the Bravos play.

Cidra is also the birthplace of several important figures in the Puerto Rican sports scene. Some of them are former MLB players Luis Rivera and Luis López, as well as former coach of the Puerto Rico men's national basketball team Flor Meléndez. Boxer José Pedraza was also born in Cidra.

=== Notable Cidreños ===
- Pura Belpré - Educator who served as the first Puerto Rican librarian in New York City
- Vicente Carattini - Singer and composer of Puerto Rican Christmas related songs
- Felito Félix - Singer
- Soraya Marcano - Visual artist
- Isabel Freire de Matos - Writer, educator, journalist, and activist for Puerto Rican independence
- Antonio Torres Pérez (Pancholo) - Actor and Comedian
- Carmen Vazquez Rivera - Head Nurse and decorated veteran of the US Army and Air Force who was among the Puerto Rican women that served in World War II and later the Korean War.

== Demographics ==
Historical population
Census	Pop.	Note	%±
1900	7,552		—
1910	10,595		40.3%
1920	14,789		39.6%
1930	19,662		33.0%
1940	20,392		3.7%
1950	20,491		0.5%
1960	21,891		6.8%
1970	23,892		9.1%
1980	28,365		18.7%
1990	35,601		25.5%
2000	42,753		20.1%
2010	43,480		1.7%
2020	39,970		−8.1%
2025 (est.)	39,669	▼	−0.8%
U.S. Decennial Census; 1899 (shown as 1900) 1910-1930; 1930-1950 1960-2000 2010 2020

The population of Cidra increased steadily during the 20th Century. Since 1899, the population has risen more than 200%. According to the 2010 census, the municipality had 43,480 inhabitants. The 2020 census shows a decline in population to 39,970.

According to the 2010 Census, 77% of the population identifies themselves as White, and 8.3% as African-American. Also, 48.9% of the population identified themselves as males, and 51.1% as females. Finally, 25% of the population is under 18 years old. The next biggest percentage of population (20.7%) is between 35 and 49 years old.

== Government ==
All municipalities in Puerto Rico are administered by a mayor, elected every four years. The current mayor of Cidra is Delvis Pagán Clavijo, of the New Progressive Party (PNP). He was first elected at the 2024 general elections.

The city belongs to the Puerto Rico Senatorial district VI, which is represented by two Senators. In 2024, Rafael Santos Ortiz and Wilmer Reyes Berríos were elected as District Senators.

== Symbols ==
The municipio has an official flag and coat of arms. The coat of arms, flag and seal of Cidra were designed by J.J. Santa Pinter and approved on September 25, 1975 by Cidra.

=== Flag and coat of arms ===
Flag of Cidra

The flag of Cidra features one brown vertical stripe on the left side, with a width of about one-third the length of the flag. It also features two equal-sized horizontal stripes to the right side of the brown one. The above stripe is green, while the lower one is yellow, or golden. The golden color symbolizes the richness of the fruits and its hydrography, as well as the spiritual wealth of the region. The green symbolizes the green landscape that can be seen in Cidra throughout the year, which is also the reason why the town is called the "Town of the Eternal Spring". The brown symbolizes the Virgin, patron saint of the town, and also the Paloma sabanera that is widely seen in the area.

Some versions of the flag also feature the coat of arms on the left hand side, over the intersection of the three stripes. The coat of arms was approved in the 1970s by the Municipal Assembly. It features a red band crossing the shield diagonally, from left to right. Over the red band lies a golden citrus, which is believed to be one of the reasons for the town's name, and a cornucopia of fruits, which alludes to Cidra's role as one of the major producers of fruits of the island. The upper field is either white or silver, and features two symbols: a black scapular representing the Virgin, and a black bishop hat referencing San Juan Nepomuceno, bishop and martyr. The lower field is mostly blue and features a brown pigeon flying over a mountain range, representing the location of the town in the Central Mountain Range, and a set of silver water waves. The whole seal is capped by a three-tower crown, which is usually seen in municipal seals in the island.

=== Nicknames ===
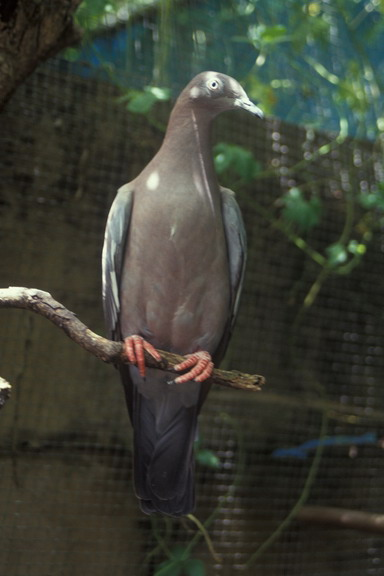
Paloma sabanera

Cidra is known mostly by two names. It is known as the "Town of the Eternal Spring" for its cool temperatures. It is also known as the "Town of the Plain Pigeon" because of the abundance of that bird in the town.

== Education ==
There are around 15 public schools in Cidra. As with all other municipalities, education is handled by the Puerto Rico Department of Education.

=== Elementary school ===
- Ceiba Nueva - Ceiba
- Luis Muñoz Rivera - Cidra
- Escuela Regino Vega Martínez - (Anterior: Escuela Nueva Santa Clara, Escuela Nueva de Arenas)
- Violeta Reyes (PreK-8) - Río Abajo

=== Junior high school ===
- Jesús T. Piñero (7-8) - Cidra

=== Mixed (elementary/junior high) ===
- Clemencia Meléndez Santos - Rabanal
- Certenejas (I & II) - Certenejas
- Juan D. Stubbe - Bayamón
- Luis Muñoz Iglesias (Especializada en Idiomas)K-12

=== High school ===
- Ana J. Candelas - Sud
- Vocacional Ruth Evelyn Cruz - Sud
- Escuela Especializada en Música Jesús T. Piñero - Pueblo

== Transportation ==
The main road to Cidra is Road 172, which branches out from the Puerto Rico Highway 52. Its distance from the capital is approximately 40 minutes. Other roads that lead to the town are #787 and #173.

There are 19 bridges in Cidra.

== See also ==
- List of Puerto Ricans
- History of Puerto Rico
- Did you know? - Puerto Rico
