= Bayamón, Cidra, Puerto Rico =

Barrio of Puerto Rico

Bayamón
- Barrio
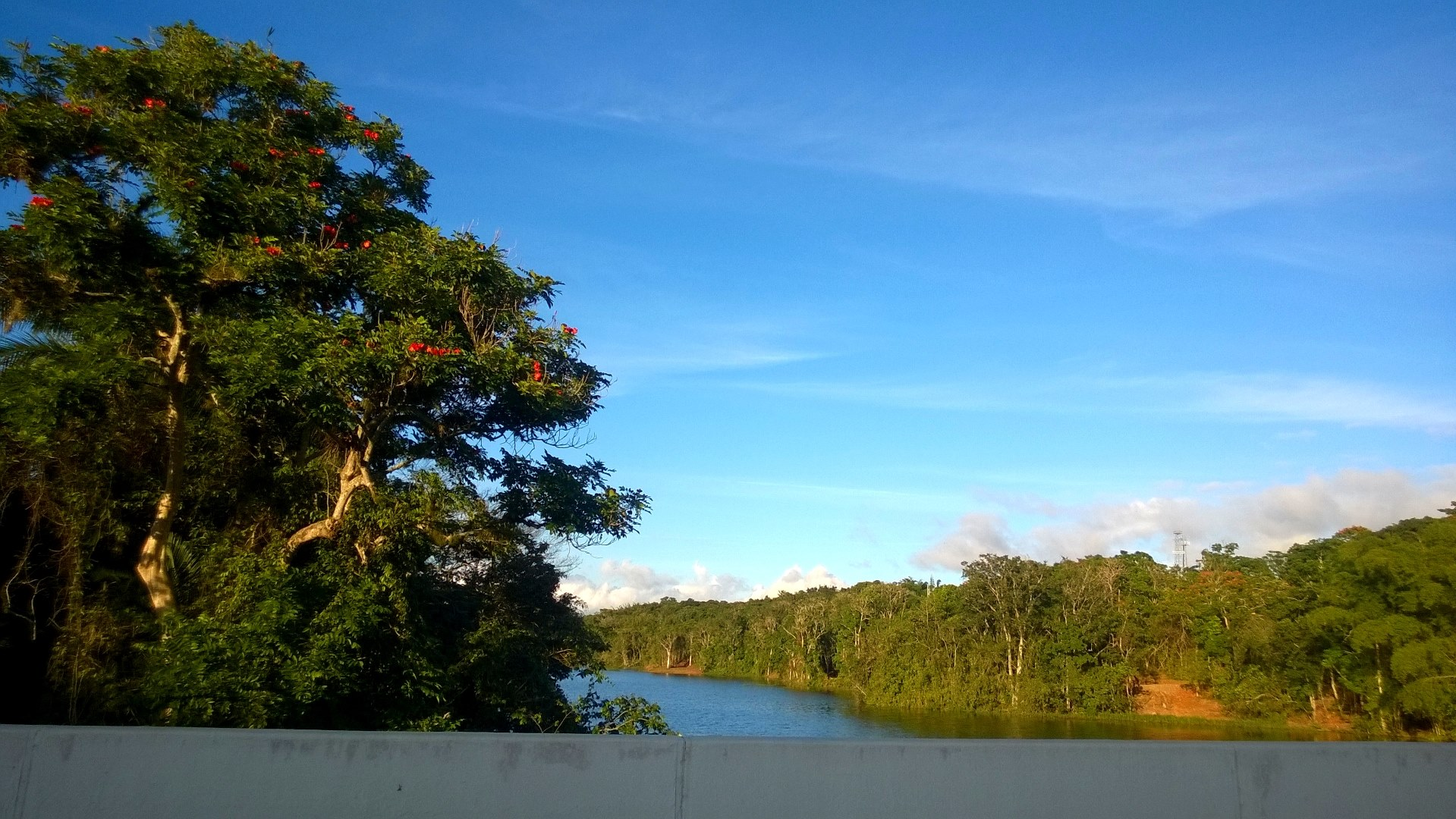
- Lago de Cidra in Bayamón

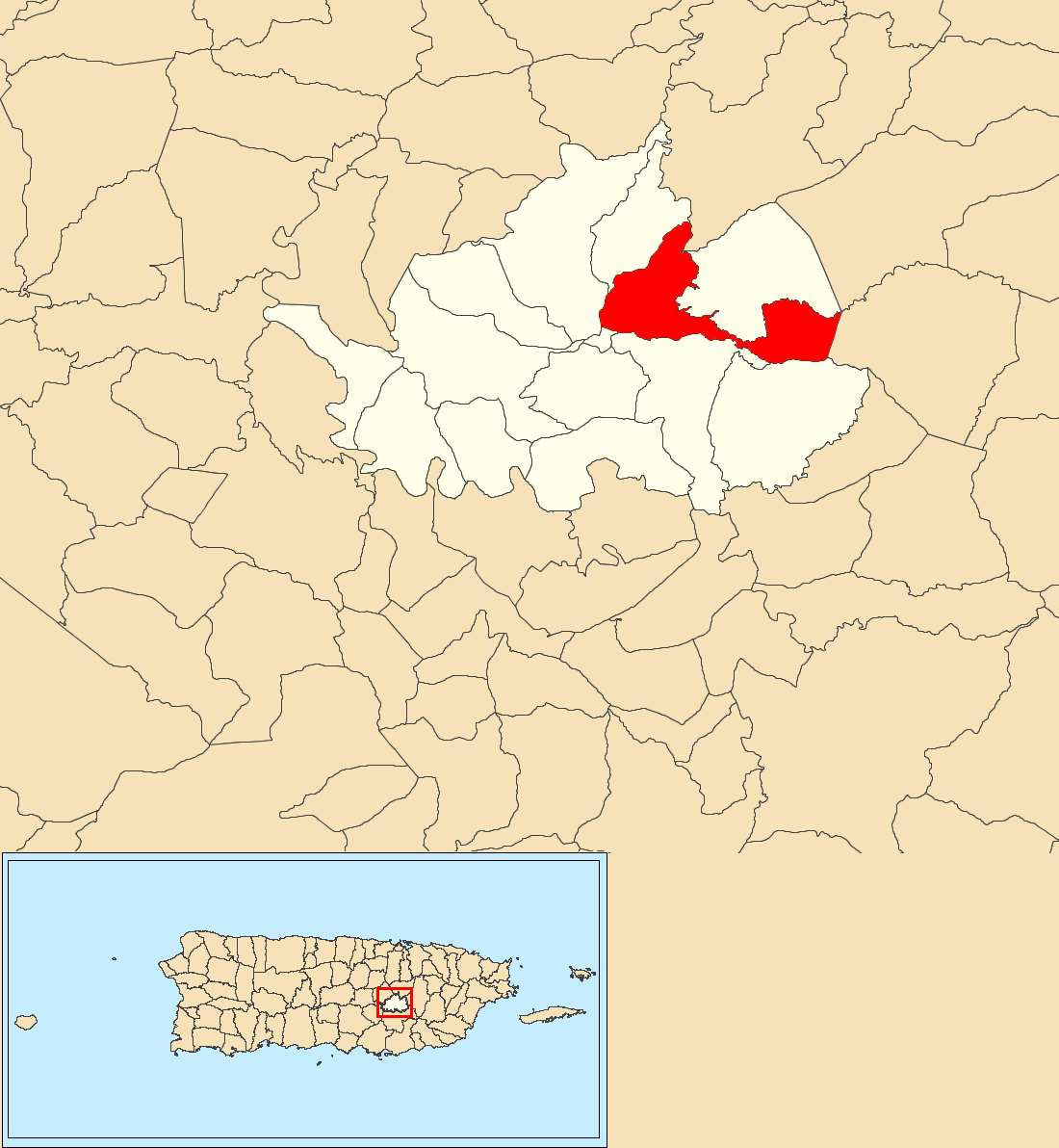
- Location of Bayamón within the municipality of Cidra shown in red

- Location of Puerto Rico
- Coordinates: 18°11′02″N 66°09′41″W
- Commonwealth: Puerto Rico
- Municipality: Cidra

Area
  - Total: 3.15 sq mi (8.2 km^{2})
  - Land: 2.85 sq mi (7.4 km^{2})
  - Water: 0.30 sq mi (0.78 km^{2})
- Elevation: 1,388 ft (423 m)

Population (2010)
  - Total: 5,995
  - Density: 2,103.5/sq mi (812.2/km^{2})
- Source: 2010 Census
- Time zone: UTC−4 (AST)
- ZIP Code: 00739
- Area code: 787/939

Bayamón is a barrio in the municipality of Cidra, Puerto Rico. Its population in 2010 was 5,995.

== History ==
Bayamón was in Spain's gazetteers until Puerto Rico was ceded by Spain in the aftermath of the Spanish–American War under the terms of the Treaty of Paris of 1898 and became an unincorporated territory of the United States. In 1899, the United States Department of War conducted a census of Puerto Rico finding that the combined population of Bayamón barrio and Monte Llano barrio was 1,222.

Historical population
Census	Pop.	Note	%±
1910	745		—
1920	1,831		145.8%
1930	2,679		46.3%
1940	3,116		16.3%
1950	3,048		−2.2%
1960	3,040		−0.3%
1970	0		−100.0%
1980	6,463		—
1990	7,247		12.1%
2000	10,730		48.1%
2010	5,995		−44.1%
U.S. Decennial Census; 1900 (N/A) 1910-1930; 1930-1950 1980-2000 2010

== Sectors ==
Barrios (which are, in contemporary times, roughly comparable to minor civil divisions) in turn are further subdivided into smaller local populated place areas/units called sectores (sectors in English). The types of sectores may vary, from normally sector to urbanización to reparto to barriada to residencial, among others.

The following sectors are in Bayamón barrio:

Brisas del Campo, Calle Kennedy (Norte), Casas al Este de la Carretera 173, Cidra Elderly Apts., Comunidad Primitiva Vázquez, Condominio Golden Living Cidra, Las Mercedes, Monte Verde (La Casa de Piedra), Parcelas Juan Del Valle, Paseo Figueroa, Reparto Maritza, Sector Aguedo Pagán, Sector Basilio Meléndez, Sector Brisas Del Lago, Sector Camino Real, Sector Cano Rolón, Sector Certenejas I y II, Sector Cintrón (Club Rotario), Sector Cortés, Sector Daniel Pagán, Sector Delgado, Sector El Puente, Sector Fito Medina, Sector González, Sector Jesús Morales, Sector La Cuatro, Sector La Glorieta, Sector La Inmaculada, Sector La Muralla (Represa), Sector Los Cotto, Sector Los Pianos, Sector Los Ramos, Sector Machuquillo, Sector Mira Monte, Sector Monchito Santos, Sector Navarro, Sector Quebradillas, Sector Ramos, Sector Rivera, Sector Salida para Caguas Treasure Valley, Sector Tabo Merced, Sector Trinidad, Sector Vélez, Urbanización Alturas del Arenal, Urbanización Campo Primavera, Urbanización Cidra Valley, Urbanización Ciudad Primavera, Urbanización El Lago, Urbanización Estancias de Cidra, Urbanización Estancias del Bosque, Urbanización Hacienda La Cima, Urbanización Haciendas de Treasure Island, Urbanización Jardines de Treasure Island, Urbanización Las Nereidas, Urbanización Mónaco, Urbanización Monte Primavera, Urbanización Nogales, Urbanización Palmeras, Urbanización Treasure Island, Urbanización Villa Encantada, Urbanización Villa San Martín, Urbanización Villas del Bosque, Urbanización Vista Monte, Urbanización Vistas de Sabana, Villa Rosa (Narices), and Vistas de Sabanera.

In Bayamón barrio is the Bayamón comunidad and part of the Cidra urban zone.

== See also ==
- List of communities in Puerto Rico
- List of barrios and sectors of Cidra, Puerto Rico
