= Puerto Rico Highway 715 =

Highway in Puerto Rico

Highway 715
- Ruta 715

Route information
- Maintained by Puerto Rico DTPW
- Length: 5.7 km (3.5 mi)
- Existed: 1953–present

Major junctions
- South end: Sector Cercadillo in Cercadillo
- PR-7737 in Sumido
- North end: PR-1 in Matón Arriba–Sumido

Location
- Country: United States
- Territory: Puerto Rico
- Municipalities: Cayey

Highway system
- Roads in Puerto Rico; List
← PR-693	→ PR-722

Puerto Rico Highway 715 (PR-715) is a rural road located in Cayey, Puerto Rico. This highway extends from PR-1 between Matón Arriba and Sumido barrios to Cercadillo.

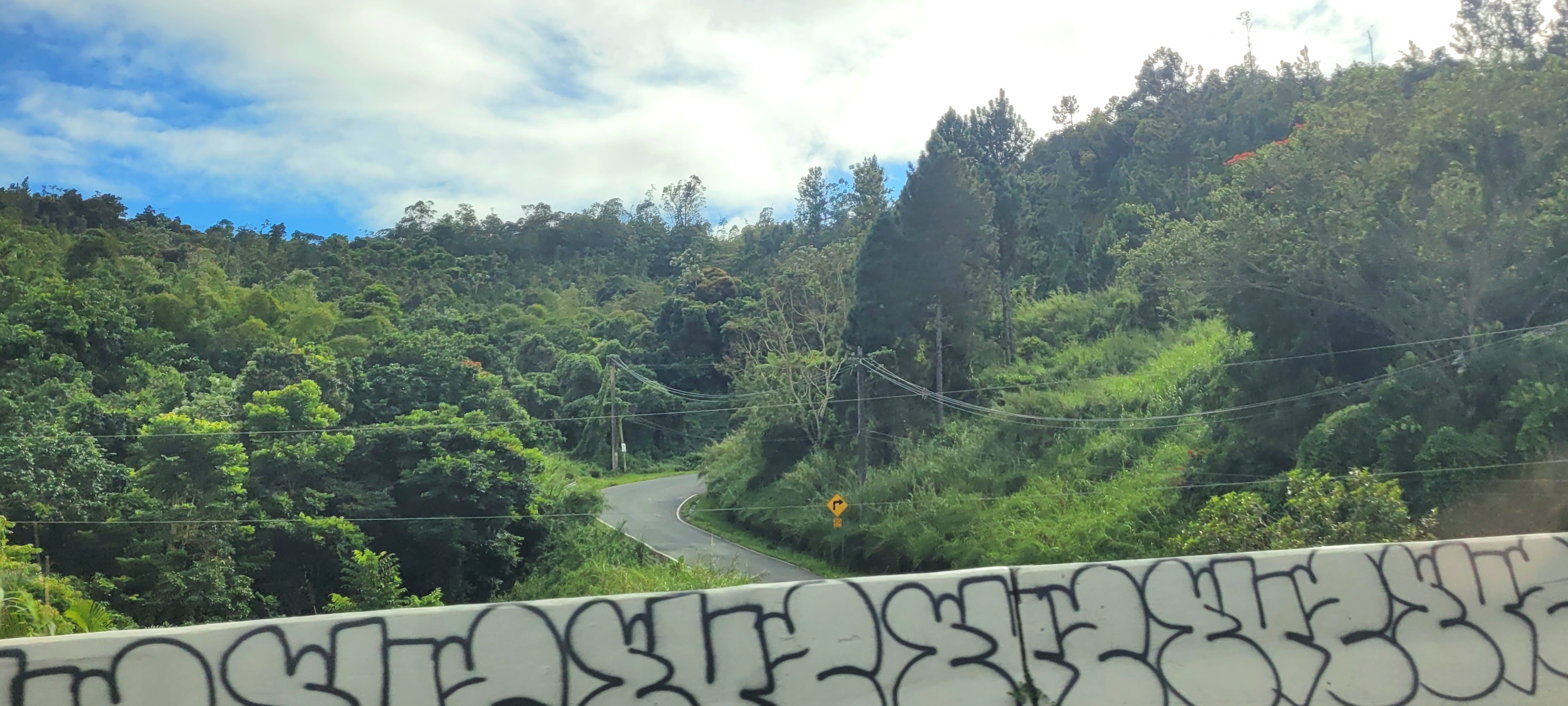
PR-715 south from PR-52 north in Sumido

== Major intersections ==
The entire route is located in Cayey.

Location	km	mi	Destinations	Notes
Cercadillo	5.7	3.5	Southern terminus of PR-715 at Sector Cercadillo; dead end road	
Sumido	2.2	1.4	PR-7737 (Ruta Panorámica) – Cayey, Guayama	Southern terminus of the Ruta Panorámica concurrency; the Ruta Panorámica continues toward Guayama
Matón Arriba–Sumido line	0.0	0.0	PR-1 – Cayey, Salinas	Northern terminus of PR-715; northern terminus of the Ruta Panorámica concurrency; the Ruta Panorámica continues toward Aibonito
1.000 mi = 1.609 km; 1.000 km = 0.621 mi: Concurrency terminus

== See also ==
- 1953 Puerto Rico highway renumbering
