= Toíta =

Toíta may refer to:

- Issei Toita (born 1999), Japanese YouTuber
- Toíta, Cayey, Puerto Rico, a barrio
- Toíta, Cidra, Puerto Rico, a barrio
