= Cedro, Cayey, Puerto Rico =

Barrio of Puerto Rico

Cedro
- Barrio
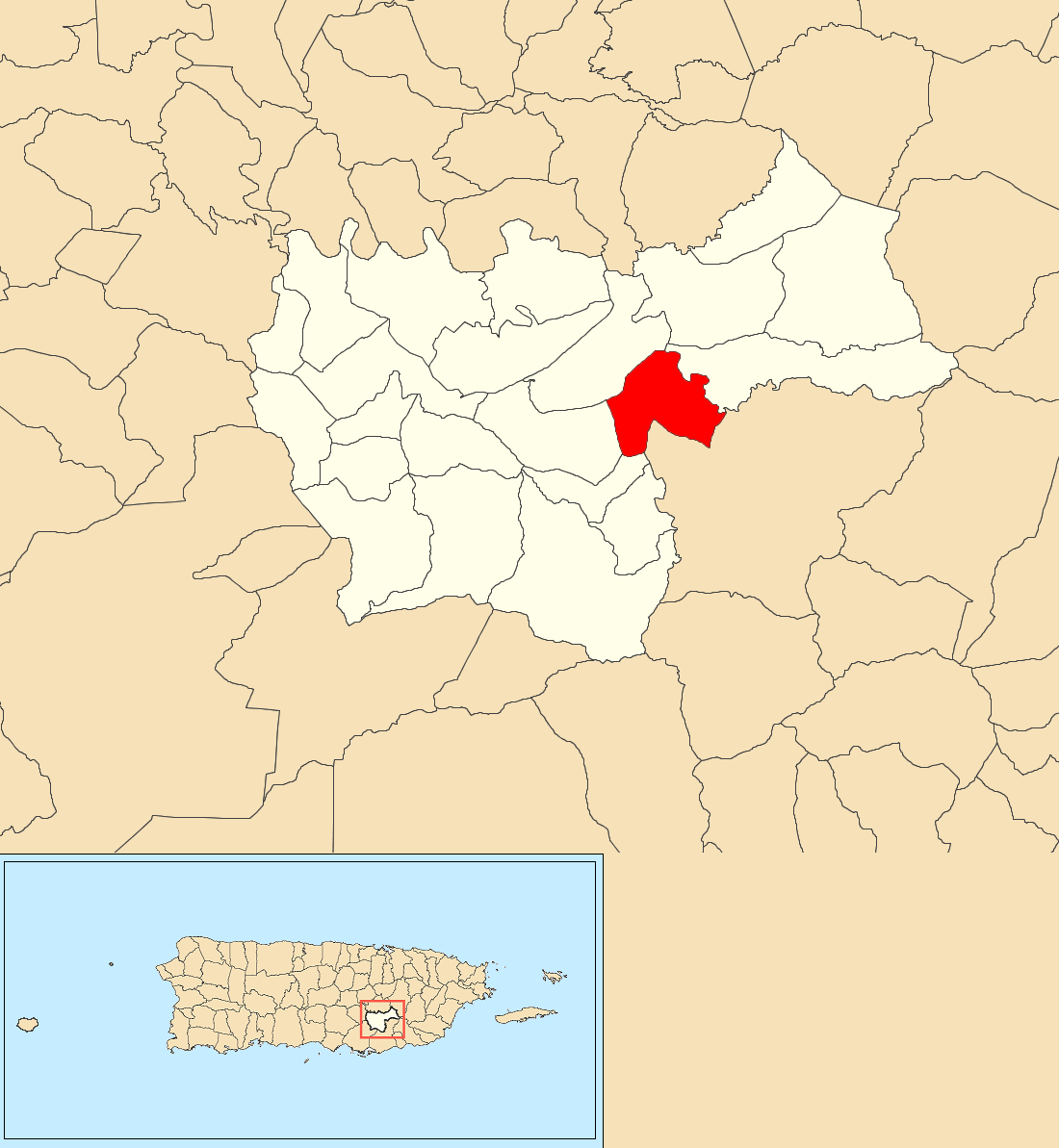
- Location of Cedro within the municipality of Cayey shown in red

- Location of Puerto Rico
- Coordinates: 18°06′06″N 66°07′30″W
- Commonwealth: Puerto Rico
- Municipality: Cayey

Area
  - Total: 1.95 sq mi (5.1 km^{2})
  - Land: 1.95 sq mi (5.1 km^{2})
  - Water: 0 sq mi (0 km^{2})
- Elevation: 1,729 ft (527 m)

Population (2010)
  - Total: 372
  - Density: 190.8/sq mi (73.7/km^{2})
- Source: 2010 Census
- Time zone: UTC−4 (AST)

Cedro is a barrio in the municipality of Cayey, Puerto Rico. Its population in 2010 was 372.

== History ==
Cedro was in Spain's gazetteers until Puerto Rico was ceded by Spain in the aftermath of the Spanish–American War under the terms of the Treaty of Paris of 1898 and became an unincorporated territory of the United States. In 1899, the United States Department of War conducted a census of Puerto Rico finding that the combined population of Cedro, Vegas, and Farallón barrios was 1,043.

Historical population
Census	Pop.	Note	%±
1910	268		—
1920	328		22.4%
1930	724		120.7%
1940	522		−27.9%
1950	621		19.0%
1960	533		−14.2%
1970	424		−20.5%
1980	302		−28.8%
1990	425		40.7%
2000	777		82.8%
2010	372		−52.1%
U.S. Decennial Census; 1900 (N/A) 1910-1930; 1930-1950 1980-2000 2010

== See also ==
- List of communities in Puerto Rico
