= Piedras, Cayey, Puerto Rico =

Barrio of Puerto Rico

Piedras
- Barrio
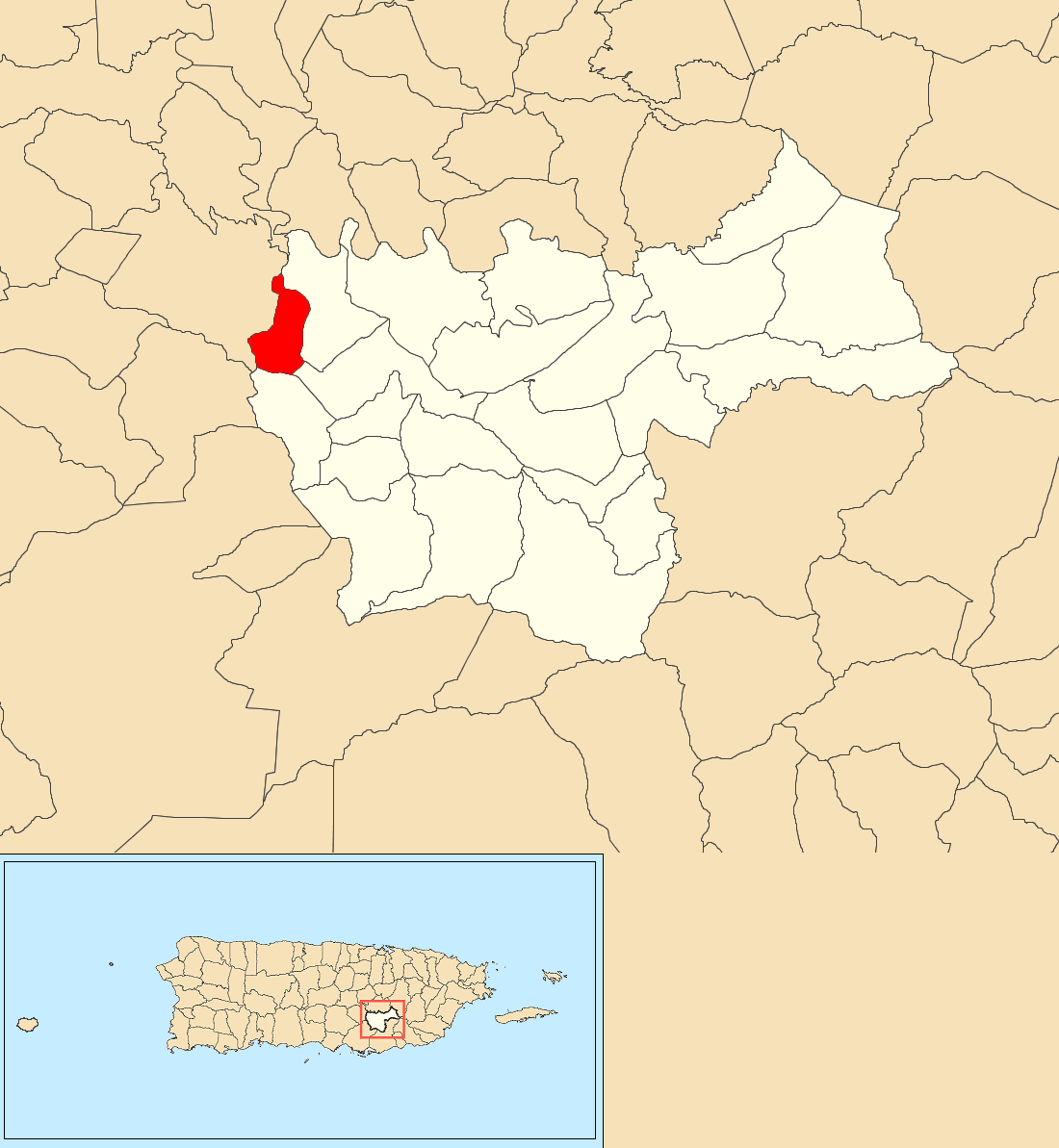
- Location of Piedras within the municipality of Cayey shown in red

- Location of Puerto Rico
- Coordinates: 18°07′07″N 66°13′06″W
- Commonwealth: Puerto Rico
- Municipality: Cayey

Area
  - Total: 0.93 sq mi (2.4 km^{2})
  - Land: 0.93 sq mi (2.4 km^{2})
  - Water: 0 sq mi (0 km^{2})
- Elevation: 2,224 ft (678 m)

Population (2010)
  - Total: 195
  - Density: 209.7/sq mi (81.0/km^{2})
- Source: 2010 Census
- Time zone: UTC−4 (AST)

Piedras is a barrio in the municipality of Cayey, Puerto Rico. Its population in 2010 was 195.

== History ==
Piedras was in Spain's gazetteers until Puerto Rico was ceded by Spain in the aftermath of the Spanish–American War under the terms of the Treaty of Paris of 1898 and became an unincorporated territory of the United States. In 1899, the United States Department of War conducted a census of Puerto Rico finding that the combined population of Piedras and Matón Abajo barrios was 965.

Historical population
Census	Pop.	Note	%±
1910	324		—
1920	471		45.4%
1930	400		−15.1%
1940	368		−8.0%
1950	263		−28.5%
1960	193		−26.6%
1970	98		−49.2%
1980	23		−76.5%
1990	207		800.0%
2000	59		−71.5%
2010	195		230.5%
U.S. Decennial Census; 1900 (N/A) 1910-1930; 1930-1950 1980-2000 2010

== See also ==
- List of communities in Puerto Rico
