= Farallón, Cayey, Puerto Rico =

Barrio of Puerto Rico

Farallón
- Barrio
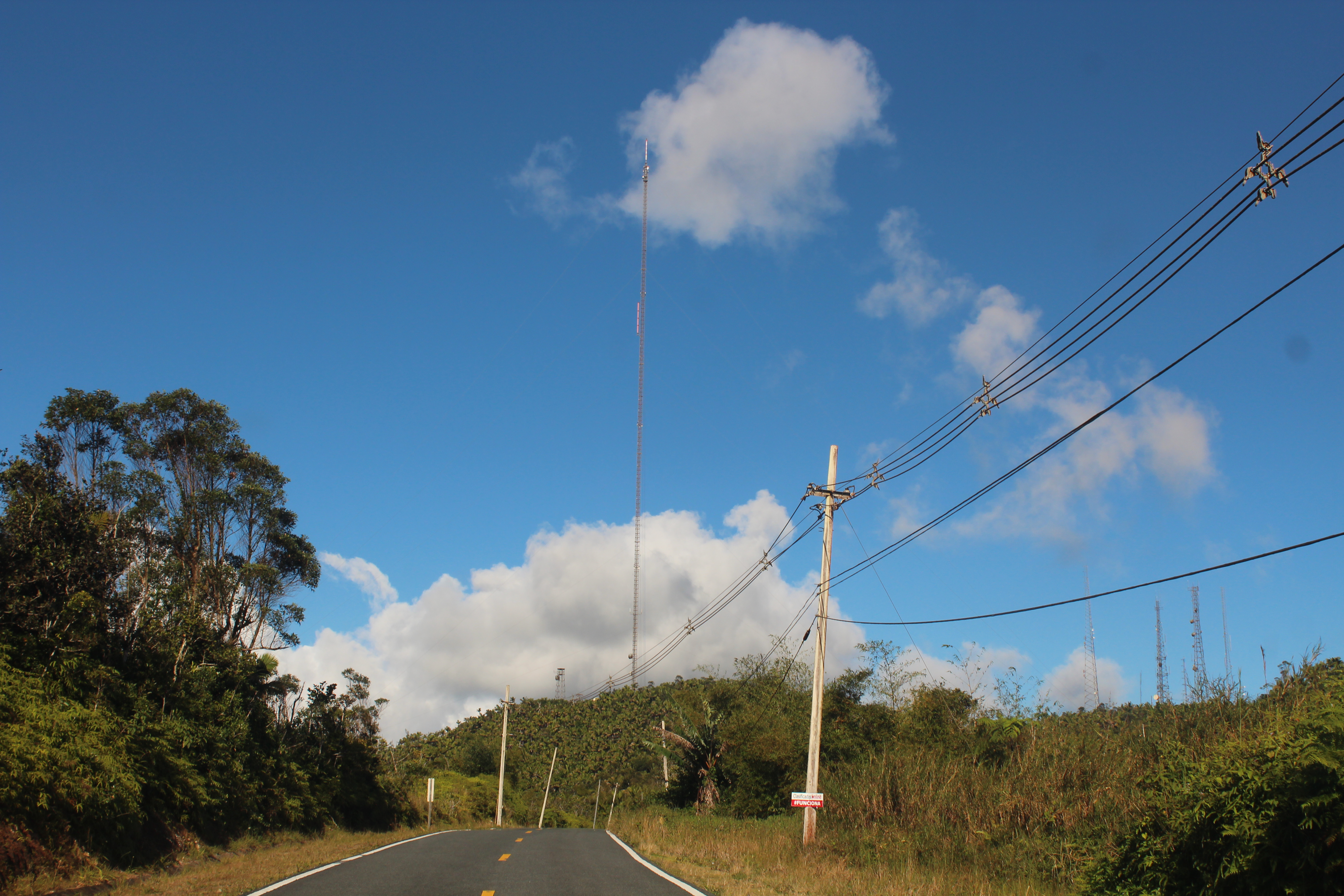
- Puerto Rico Highway 184 in Farallón

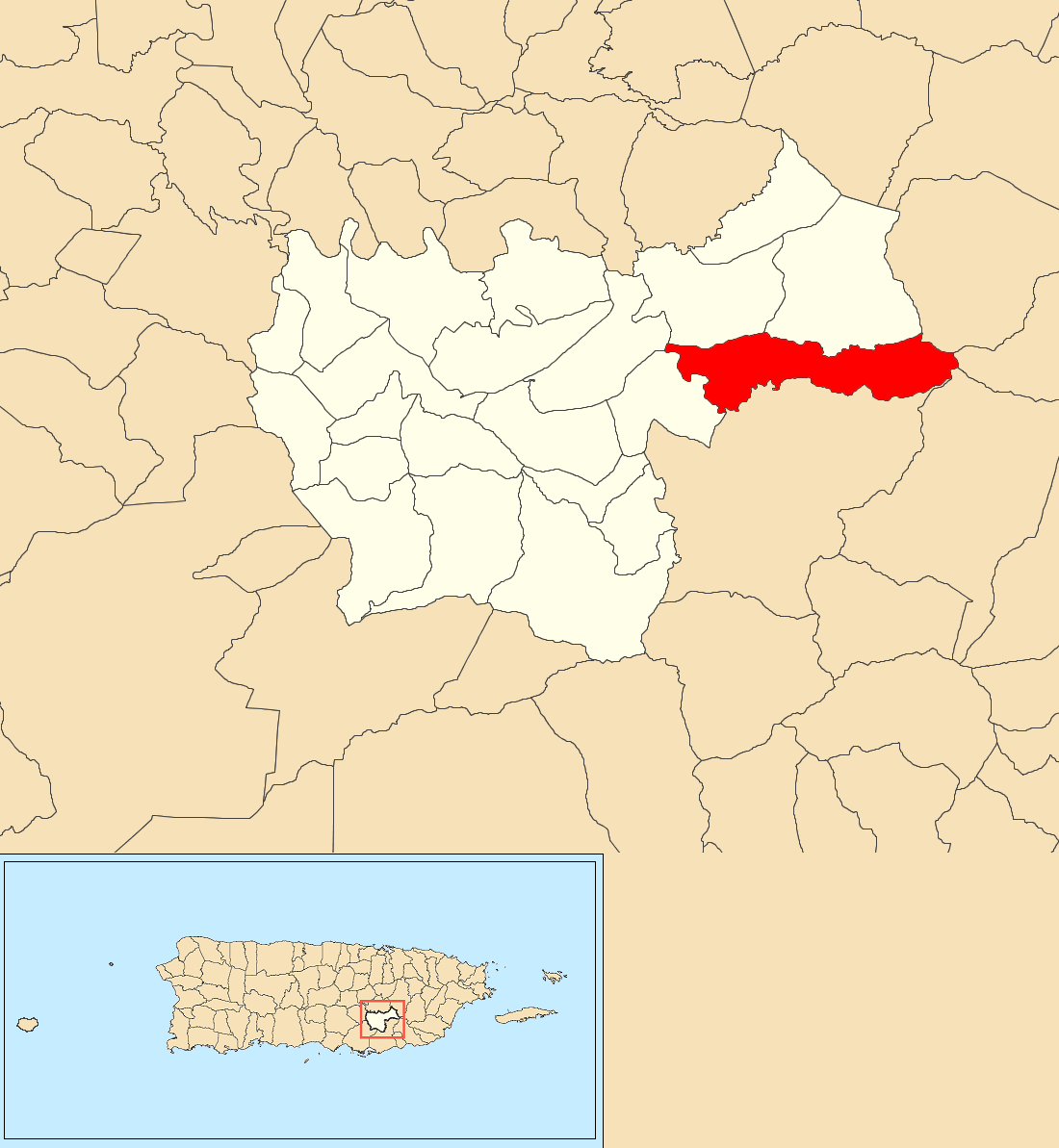
- Location of Farallón within the municipality of Cayey shown in red

- Location of Puerto Rico
- Coordinates: 18°06′34″N 66°05′48″W
- Commonwealth: Puerto Rico
- Municipality: Cayey

Area
  - Total: 3.52 sq mi (9.1 km^{2})
  - Land: 3.52 sq mi (9.1 km^{2})
  - Water: 0 sq mi (0 km^{2})
- Elevation: 2,228 ft (679 m)

Population (2010)
  - Total: 451
  - Density: 128.1/sq mi (49.5/km^{2})
- Source: 2010 Census
- Time zone: UTC−4 (AST)

Farallón is a barrio in the municipality of Cayey, Puerto Rico. Its population in 2010 was 451.

== History ==
Farallón was in Spain's gazetteers until Puerto Rico was ceded by Spain in the aftermath of the Spanish–American War under the terms of the Treaty of Paris of 1898 and became an unincorporated territory of the United States. In 1899, the United States Department of War conducted a census of Puerto Rico finding that the combined population of Farallón, Cedro, and Vegas barrios was 1,043.

Historical population
Census	Pop.	Note	%±
1910	380		—
1920	648		70.5%
1930	773		19.3%
1940	779		0.8%
1950	851		9.2%
1960	715		−16.0%
1970	576		−19.4%
1980	583		1.2%
1990	671		15.1%
2000	623		−7.2%
2010	451		−27.6%
U.S. Decennial Census; 1900 (N/A) 1910-1930; 1930-1950 1980-2000 2010

== See also ==
- List of communities in Puerto Rico
