= Matón Abajo, Cayey, Puerto Rico =

Barrio of Puerto Rico

Matón Abajo
- Barrio
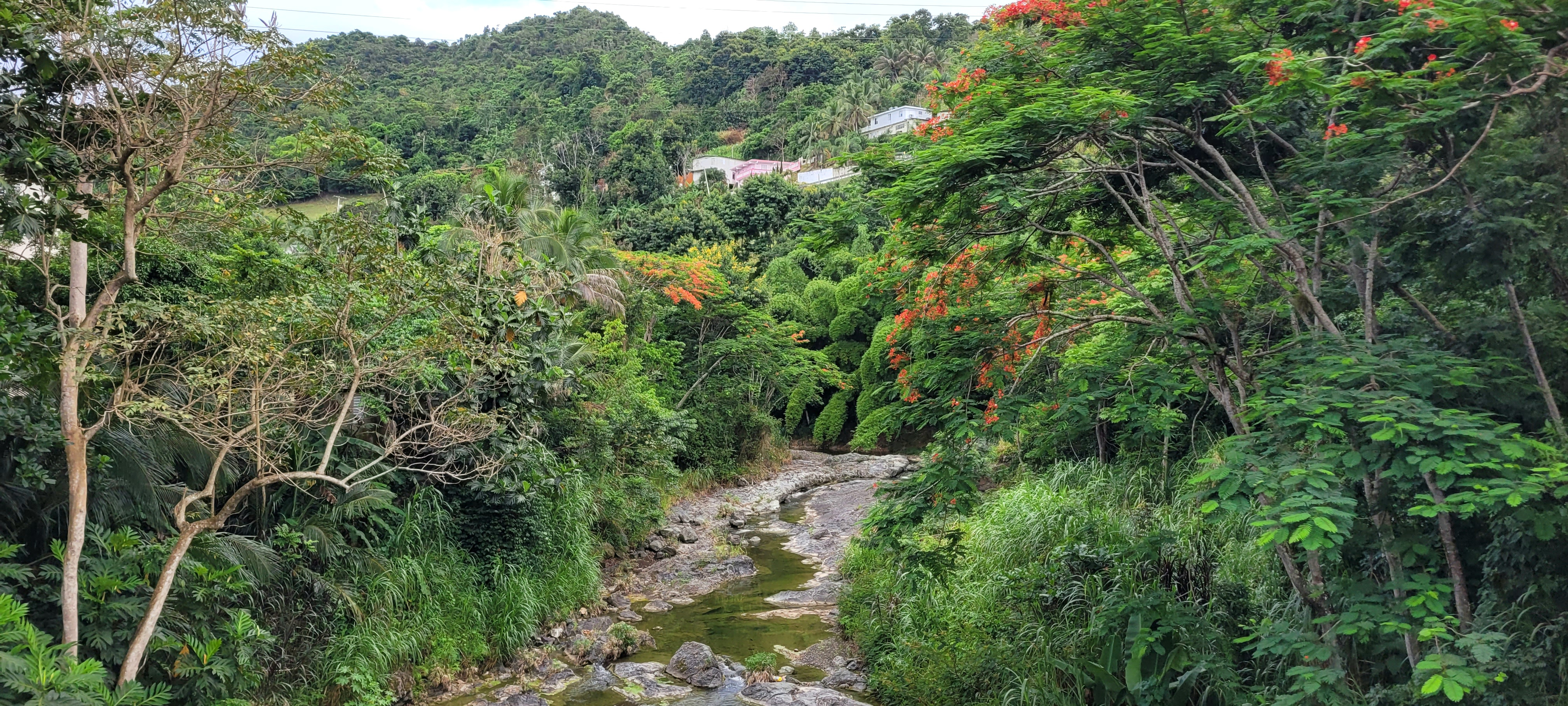
- Matón River in Matón Abajo

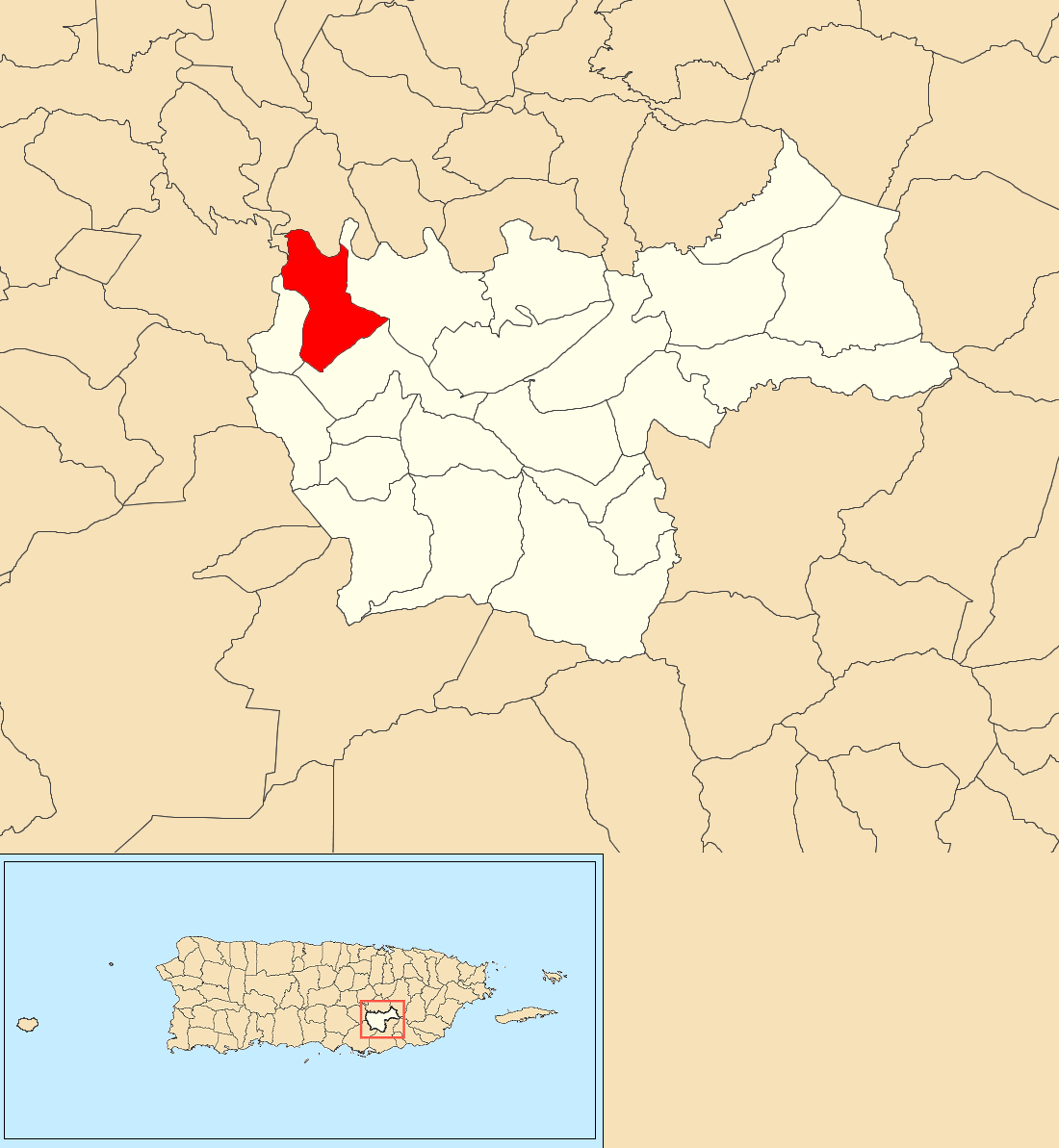
- Location of Matón Abajo within the municipality of Cayey shown in red

- Location of Puerto Rico
- Coordinates: 18°07′31″N 66°12′09″W
- Commonwealth: Puerto Rico
- Municipality: Cayey

Area
  - Total: 1.93 sq mi (5.0 km^{2})
  - Land: 1.93 sq mi (5.0 km^{2})
  - Water: 0 sq mi (0 km^{2})
- Elevation: 1,138 ft (347 m)

Population (2010)
  - Total: 926
  - Density: 479.8/sq mi (185.3/km^{2})
- Source: 2010 Census
- Time zone: UTC−4 (AST)

Matón Abajo is a barrio in the municipality of Cayey, Puerto Rico. Its population in 2010 was 926.

== History ==
Matón Abajo was in Spain's gazetteers until Puerto Rico was ceded by Spain in the aftermath of the Spanish–American War under the terms of the Treaty of Paris of 1898 and became an unincorporated territory of the United States. In 1899, the United States Department of War conducted a census of Puerto Rico finding that the combined population of Matón Abajo and Piedras barrios was 965.

Historical population
Census	Pop.	Note	%±
1910	865		—
1920	798		−7.7%
1930	918		15.0%
1940	916		−0.2%
1950	936		2.2%
1960	970		3.6%
1970	557		−42.6%
1980	948		70.2%
1990	1,109		17.0%
2000	1,184		6.8%
2010	926		−21.8%
U.S. Decennial Census; 1900 (N/A) 1910-1930; 1930-1950 1980-2000 2010

== See also ==
- List of communities in Puerto Rico
