= Jájome Bajo, Cayey, Puerto Rico =

Barrio of Puerto Rico

Jájome Bajo
- Barrio
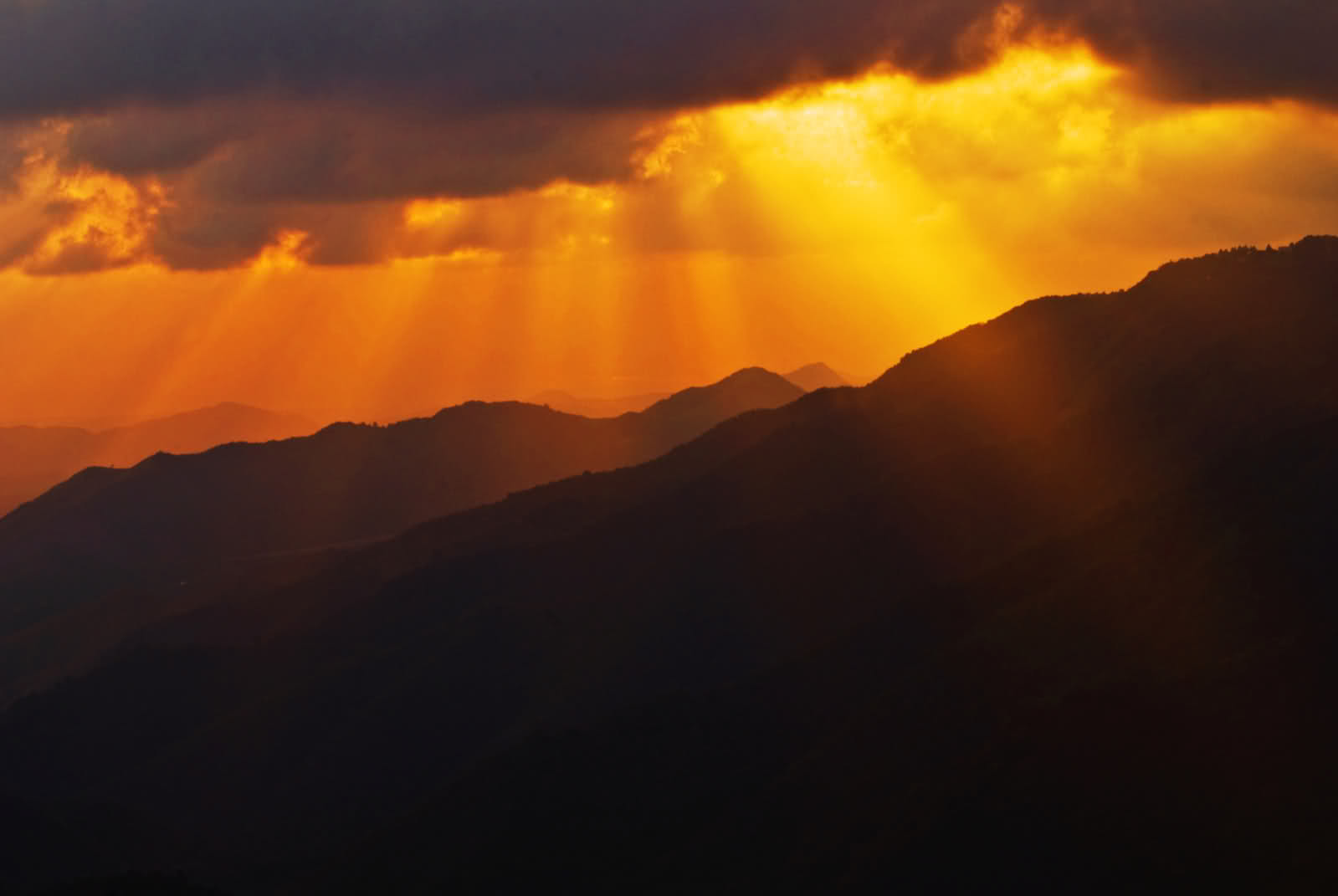
- Sunset at Jájome Bajo

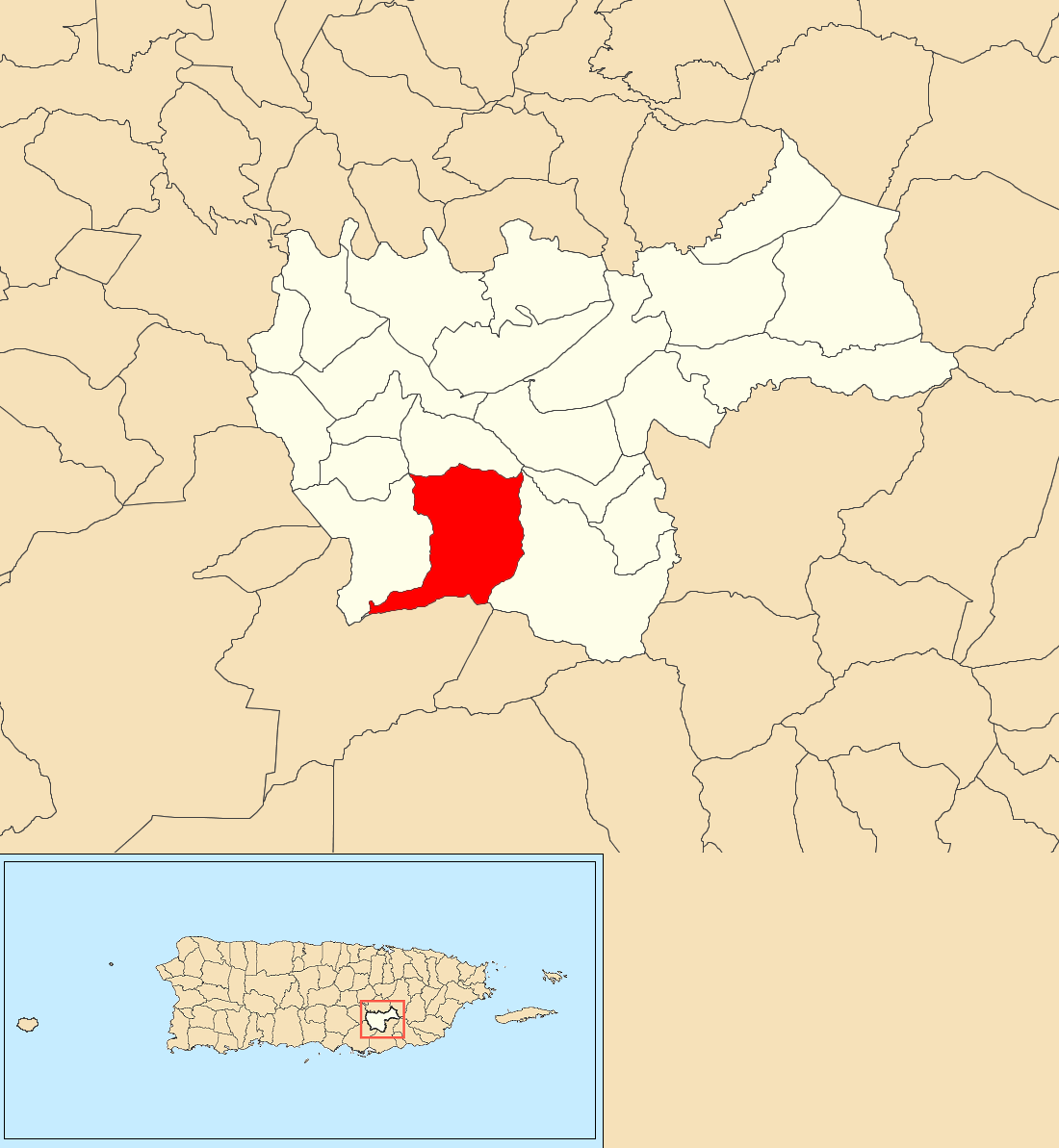
- Location of Jájome Bajo within the municipality of Cayey shown in red

- Location of Puerto Rico
- Coordinates: 18°04′06″N 66°10′23″W
- Commonwealth: Puerto Rico
- Municipality: Cayey

Area
  - Total: 3.47 sq mi (9.0 km^{2})
  - Land: 3.47 sq mi (9.0 km^{2})
  - Water: 0 sq mi (0 km^{2})
- Elevation: 1,375 ft (419 m)

Population (2010)
  - Total: 519
  - Density: 149.6/sq mi (57.8/km^{2})
- Source: 2010 Census
- Time zone: UTC−4 (AST)

Jájome Bajo is a barrio in the municipality of Cayey, Puerto Rico. Its population in 2010 was 519.

== History ==
Jájome Bajo was in Spain's gazetteers until Puerto Rico was ceded by Spain in the aftermath of the Spanish–American War under the terms of the Treaty of Paris of 1898 and became an unincorporated territory of the United States. In 1899, the United States Department of War conducted a census of Puerto Rico finding that the combined population of Jájome Bajo and Sumido barrios was 961.

Historical population
| Census | Pop. | Note | %± |
|---|---|---|---|
| 1910 | 651 | | — |
| 1920 | 568 | | −12.7% |
| 1930 | 559 | | −1.6% |
| 1940 | 569 | | 1.8% |
| 1950 | 511 | | −10.2% |
| 1960 | 381 | | −25.4% |
| 1970 | 444 | | 16.5% |
| 1980 | 577 | | 30.0% |
| 1990 | 571 | | −1.0% |
| 2000 | 637 | | 11.6% |
| 2010 | 519 | | −18.5% |
U.S. Decennial Census; 1900 (N/A) 1910-1930; 1930-1950 1980-2000 2010

== See also ==
- List of communities in Puerto Rico
