= Vegas, Cayey, Puerto Rico =

Barrio of Puerto Rico

Vegas
- Barrio
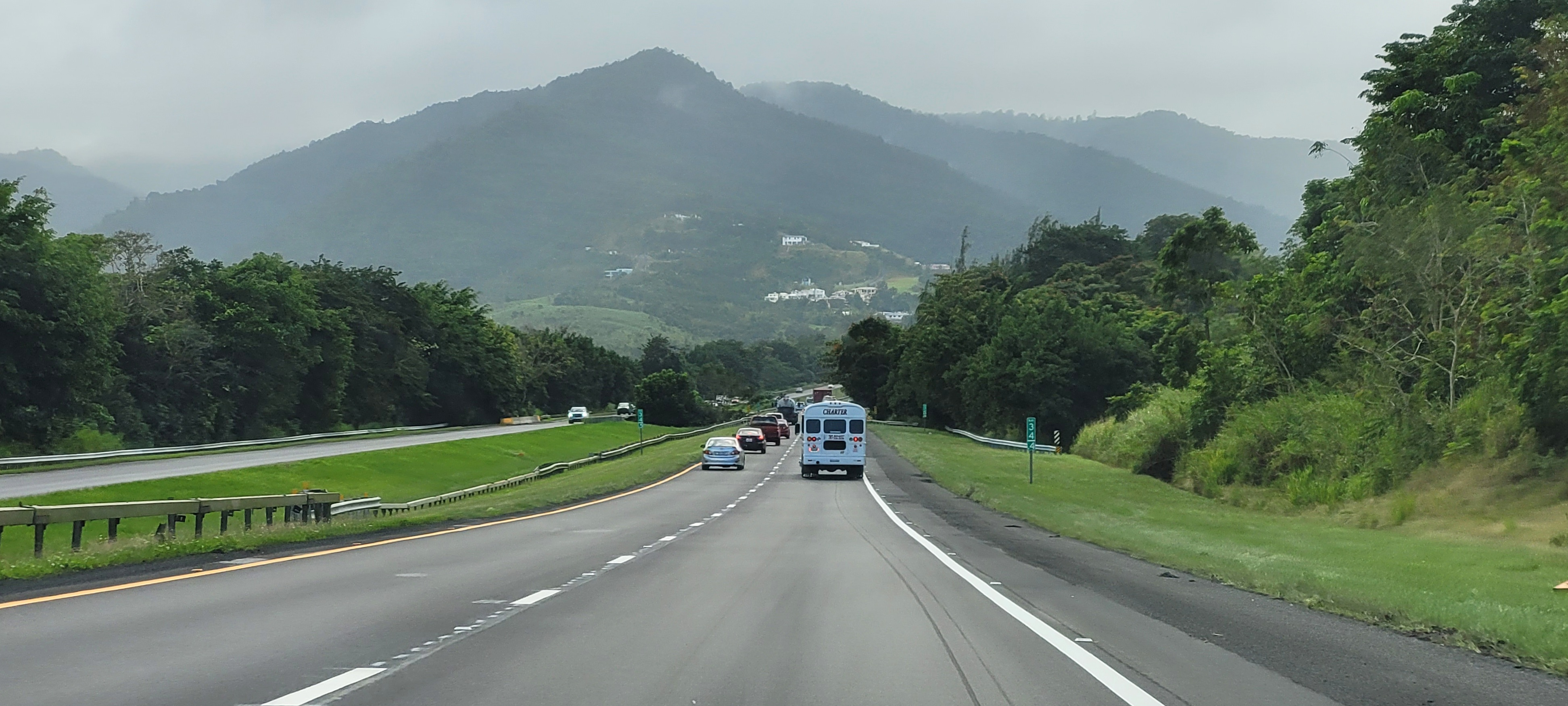
- Puerto Rico Highway 52 in Vegas

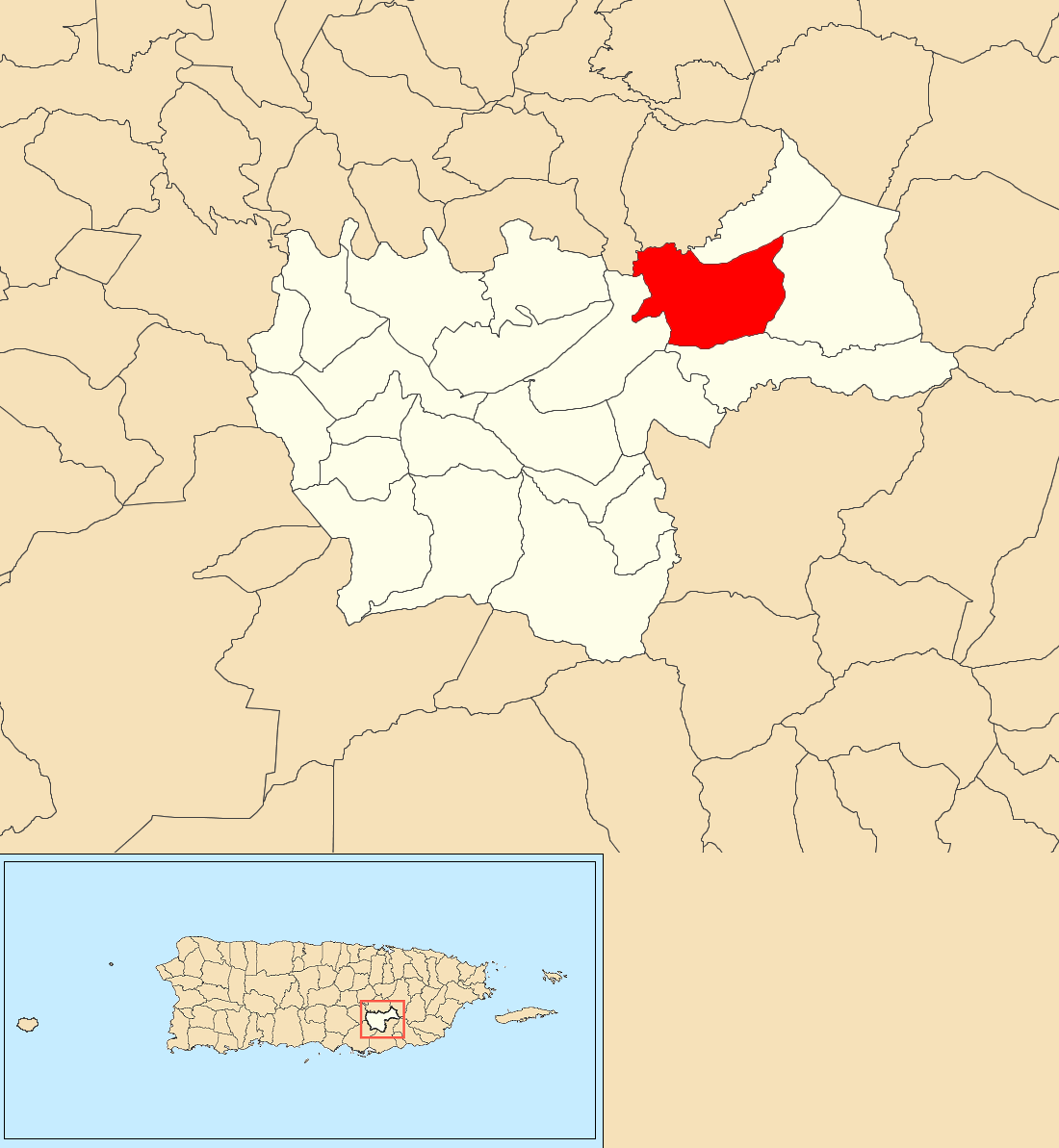
- Location of Vegas within the municipality of Cayey shown in red

- Location of Puerto Rico
- Coordinates: 18°07′42″N 66°06′48″W
- Commonwealth: Puerto Rico
- Municipality: Cayey

Area
  - Total: 3.14 sq mi (8.1 km^{2})
  - Land: 3.13 sq mi (8.1 km^{2})
  - Water: 0.01 sq mi (0.026 km^{2})
- Elevation: 1,247 ft (380 m)

Population (2010)
  - Total: 4,083
  - Density: 1,304.5/sq mi (503.7/km^{2})
- Source: 2010 Census
- Time zone: UTC−4 (AST)

Vegas is a barrio in the municipality of Cayey, Puerto Rico. Its population in 2010 was 4,083.

== History ==
Vegas was in Spain's gazetteers until Puerto Rico was ceded by Spain in the aftermath of the Spanish–American War under the terms of the Treaty of Paris of 1898 and became an unincorporated territory of the United States. In 1899, the United States Department of War conducted a census of Puerto Rico finding that the combined population of Vegas, Cedro and Farallón barrios was 1,043.

Historical population
Census	Pop.	Note	%±
1910	488		—
1920	608		24.6%
1930	933		53.5%
1940	914		−2.0%
1950	859		−6.0%
1960	1,454		69.3%
1970	1,725		18.6%
1980	1,746		1.2%
1990	2,242		28.4%
2000	3,029		35.1%
2010	4,083		34.8%
U.S. Decennial Census; 1900 (N/A) 1910-1930; 1930-1950 1980-2000 2010

== See also ==
- List of communities in Puerto Rico
