= Cayey, Puerto Rico =

Town and municipality in Puerto Rico

Cayey Municipio Autónomo de Cayey Cayey de Muesas
- Town and Municipality
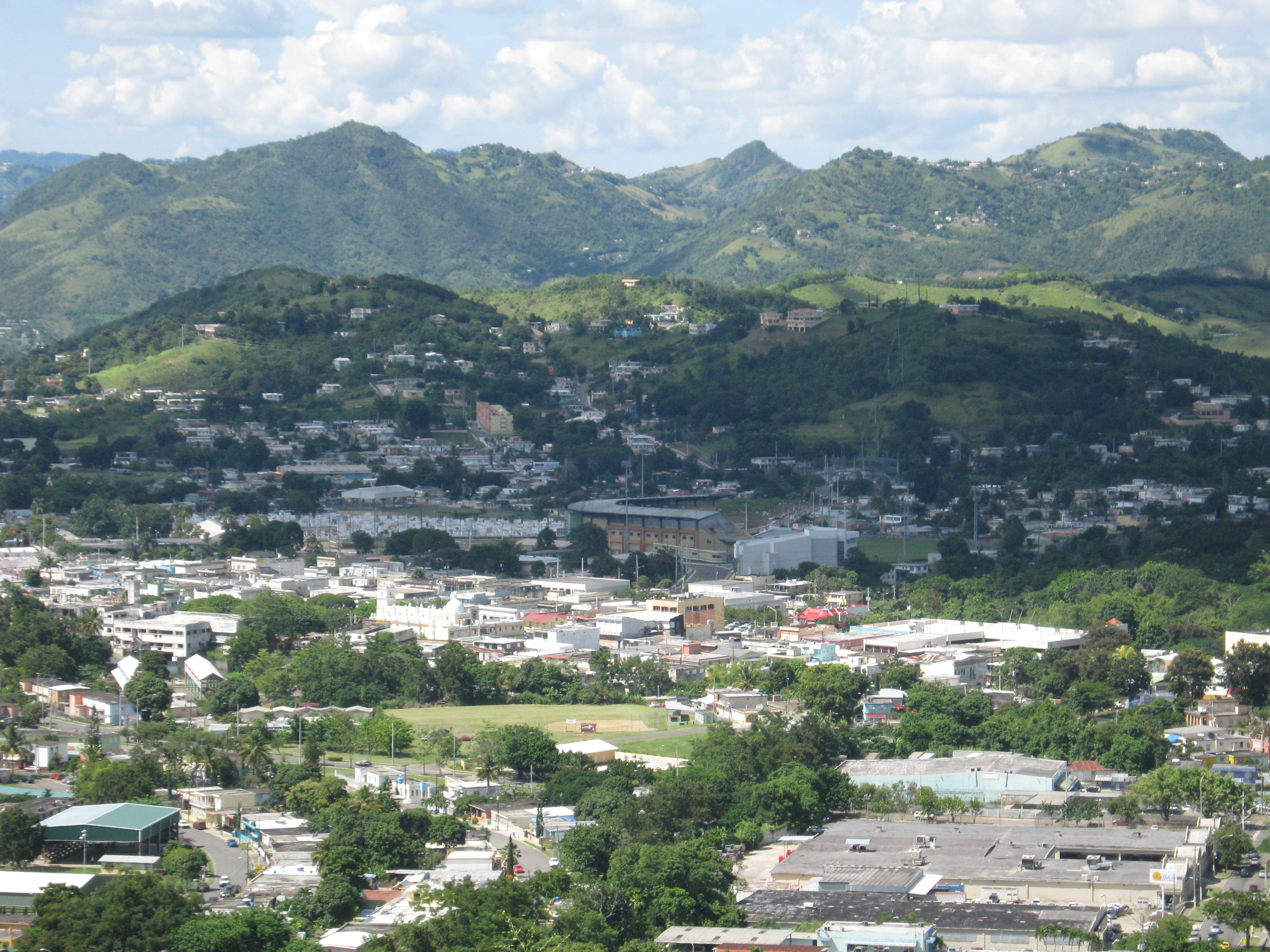
- Cayey mountains, valley and hills with homes

- Flag Coat of arms
- Nicknames: "Ciudad de las Brumas", "Ciudad del Torito", "Ciudad del Coquí Dorado"
- Anthem: "Alma Boricua"
- Map of Puerto Rico highlighting Cayey Municipality
- Coordinates: 18°06′42″N 66°09′57″W
- Sovereign state: United States
- Commonwealth: Puerto Rico
- Founded: August 17, 1773
- Founder: Juan Mata Vázquez
- Barrios: 22 barrios: Beatriz; Cayey barrio-pueblo; Cedro; Cercadillo; Culebras Alto; Culebras Bajo; Farallón; Guavate; Jájome Alto; Jájome Bajo; Lapa; Matón Abajo; Matón Arriba; Monte Llano; Pasto Viejo; Pedro Avila; Piedras; Quebrada Arriba; Rincón; Sumido; Toita; Vegas

Government
  - Mayor: Rolando Ortiz Velázquez (PPD)
  - Senatorial dist.: 6 – Guayama
  - Representative dist.: 29

Area
  - Total: 50.20 sq mi (130.01 km^{2})
  - Land: 50 sq mi (130 km^{2})
  - Water: 0.0039 sq mi (.01 km^{2})

Population (2020)
  - Total: 41,652
  - Estimate (2025): 40,027 ▼
  - Rank: 20th in Puerto Rico
  - Density: 830/sq mi (320/km^{2})
- Demonym: Cayeyanos
- Time zone: UTC−4 (AST)
- ZIP Codes: 00736, 00737
- Area code: 787/939
- Website: www.agencias.pr.gov/municipio/cayey

Cayey (Spanish pronunciation: [kaˈʝej]), officially Cayey de Muesas, is a mountain town and municipality in central Puerto Rico located on the Sierra de Cayey within the Central Mountain range, north east of Salinas and north of Guayama; south of Cidra and Caguas; east of Aibonito and west of San Lorenzo. Cayey is spread over 21 barrios plus Cayey Pueblo (the downtown area and the administrative center). It is part of the San Juan-Caguas-Guaynabo Metropolitan Statistical Area.

Cayey is notable for its surrounding mountains. The city has been actively growing since the 1990s, evidenced by its designation as a Metropolitan Area by the U.S. Census Bureau. It has experienced significant growth in commerce, and many major retailers, such as Wal-Mart have opened stores in the city. Industries in Cayey include sugar, tobacco and poultry. For tobacco there is a well-known company called Consolidated Cigar Corp. A new coliseum and hospital facilities have also been built. Coca-Cola is a major corporation that has a manufacturing facility in the town. Cayey is also host to one of the campuses of the University of Puerto Rico, the University of Puerto Rico at Cayey.

== History ==
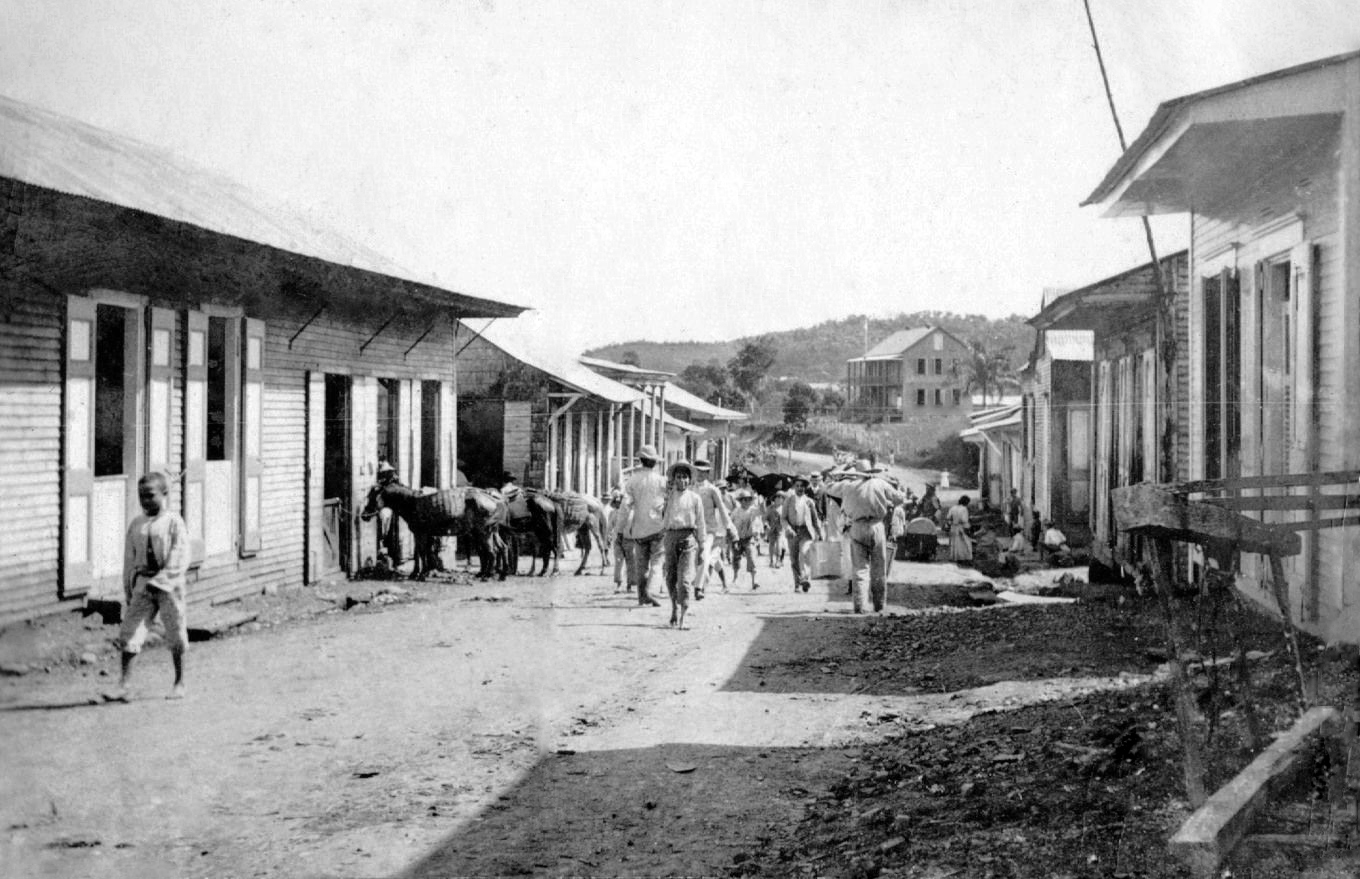
Street scene in Cayey in 1906

Cayey was founded on August 17, 1773, by Juan Mata Vázquez, who became its first mayor. It is popularly said that Cayey derives its name from the Taíno word for "a place of waters". It was named Cayey de Muesas in honor of Miguel de Muesas, the then governor of Puerto Rico. The town is located in a valley nestled between Puerto Rico's Cordillera Central mountain range and the Sierra de Cayey at roughly the midpoint of routes PR-1 and PR-52. The routes lead to a popular drive that provides panoramic views of the island from its highest points.

Puerto Rico was ceded by Spain in the aftermath of the Spanish–American War under the terms of the Treaty of Paris of 1898 and became a territory of the United States. In 1899, the United States Department of War conducted a census of Puerto Rico finding that the population of Cayey was 14,442.

An education base began in the early to mid-1950s when the Interamerican University opened a branch in Cayey providing teacher training through a night class scheme. In 1967 the University of Puerto Rico opened a campus in the former Henry Barracks Military Reservation, and in the early 1980s El Turabo University, subsidiary of the Ana G. Mendez conglomerate opened a campus in the old tobacco factory at the entrance of town. The Interamerican University will be opening a Graduate campus in front of the main town square (downtown), and there are conversations with a foreign educational concern to open a technology campus using the buildings left over by the Gordonshire Knitting Mills. There are three major private schools: Radians School, the long established Colegio de Nuestra Senora de la Merced and La Milagrosa School. Cayey's health care base expanded in the mid-1960s with the Mennonite Medical Center and a Municipal Hospital along with laboratories, and urgent care centers that cater to the poor and the elderly.

With the construction of the Interstate (PR-52), Cayey has evolved into a "bedroom community" with gated housing developments, located just 30 minutes from San Juan and 45 minutes away from Ponce. With pleasant weather and private schools, Cayey has become a prime location for the affluent.

Hurricane Maria on September 20, 2017, triggered numerous landslides in Cayey with significant amount of rain and wind. The hurricane destroyed 3,000 homes in Cayey.

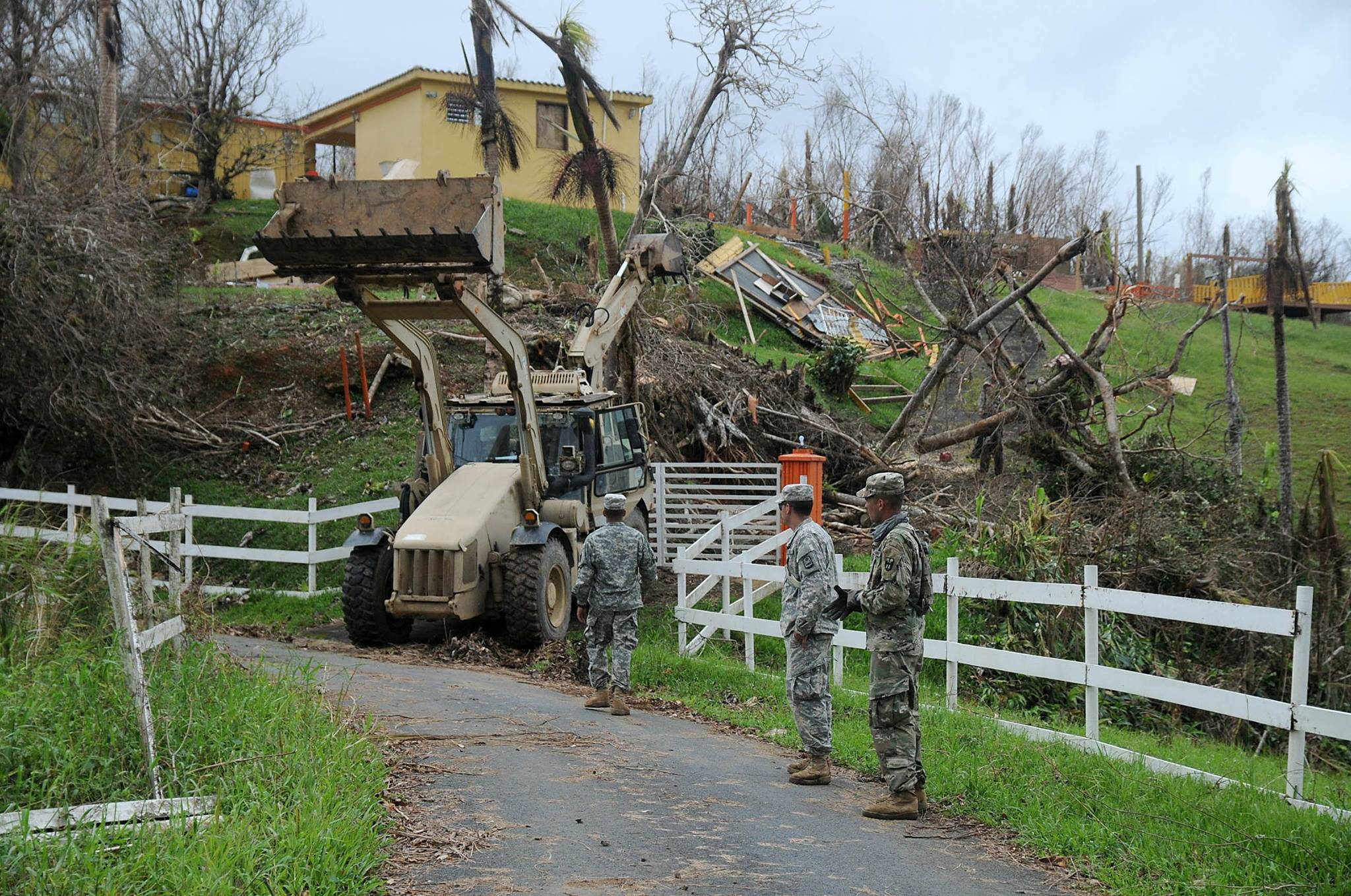
National Guard in Cayey after Hurricane Maria

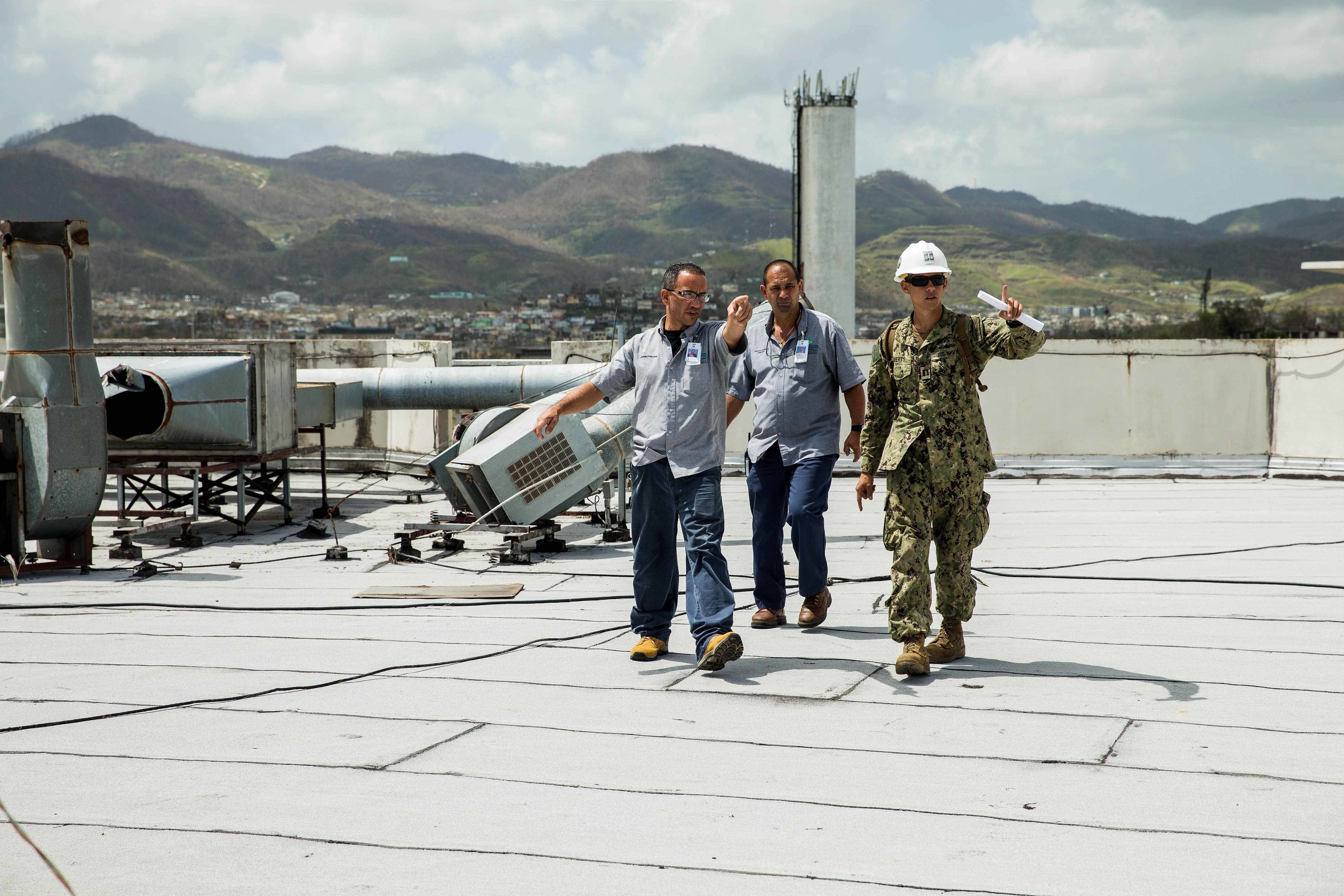
Mennonite hospital in Cayey

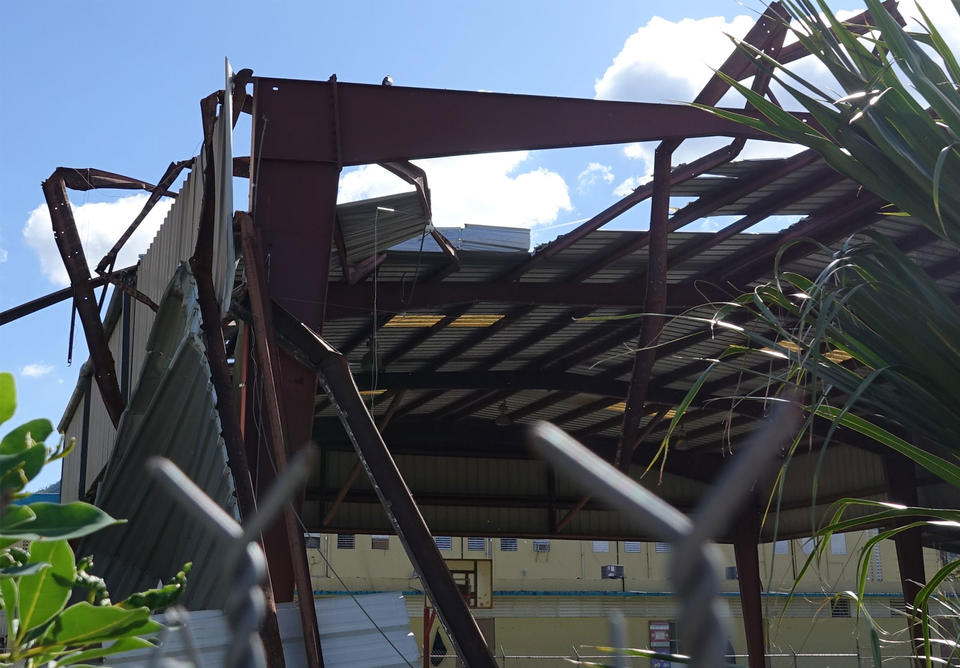
Damaged basketball court

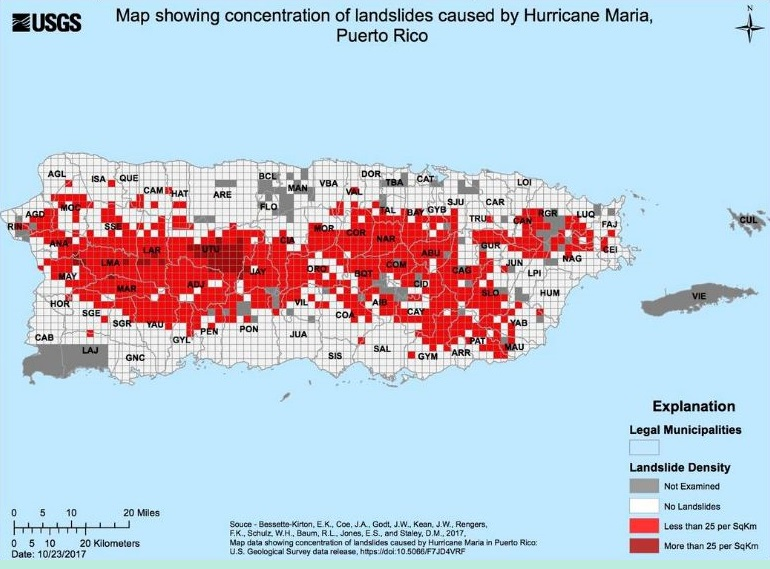
Map of landslides in Puerto Rico

=== Impact of Henry Barracks Military Reservation ===
Henry Barracks Military Reservation was a lifeline for the residents of Cayey from 1901 to 1966, when it was declared excess land and passed to the General Services Administration for decommission. The property consisted of 178.03 hectares (439.92 acres). The property was divided into three prominent encampments: the Spanish Camp or Campamento Español (6.1 hectares (15 acres)), Camp Henry or Henry Barracks, the Home of the third Battalion of the 65th Inf. Regiment that consisted of 151 hectares (372 acres), and 27 hectares (67 acres) the Cayey Naval Radio Station (27 hectares (67 acres) )). This reservation is situated in the east of the town of Cayey. The Spanish Reservation containing an area of approximately 6.1 hectares (15 acres), known as Hospital Hill was set apart by Executive Order of June 30, 1903, under an Act of Congress approved on July 7, 1902. The main army post was located in the northern part of the reservation, initially housing the Puerto Rico Volunteer Infantry Regiment.

The combined posts had approximately 1,200 men who used the resources provided by the town people. Families moved into Punta Brava and Vieques neighborhoods. A laundry, show shop, and other smaller stores were located right outside the gate. By 1906 about 350 civilians had jobs in the two posts (Camp Henry and The Cayey Navy Radio Station).

The U.S. Department of the Navy submitted a proposal to raise three 190 metres (620 ft) tall masts as part of a global radio communication linkage. In 1916 the Department of the Navy approved a budget of $40,000. At the time 300 men were hired to build the facility for a period of two-year, the project was completed in 1918

On September 11, 1928, a category five hurricane called San Felipe destroyed the temporary buildings at Henry Barracks, and the Navy Radio Station. A radio message was sent from the Cayey Navy Radio Station on September 18, 1928, to follow “All buildings Henry Barracks destroyed by hurricane September 13th”. The Navy left Cayey and moved its station to Isla Grande and Stop 7 1/2 in Puerto de Tierra. All the land held by the Navy included Magazine Hill (known in the community as "El Polvorin"), which was taken over by the U. S. Army. The 65th Infantry Regiment remained in the north side of the post. The south side was converted into two 300 metres (1,000 ft) shooting ranges The decision was made to reconstruct all building for the regiment in the north side in concrete One hundred and ninety buildings were completed, to include the north side of Henry Barracks. Over 600 men were hired for a period of three years to work in these projects. During this period three large barrack buildings were constructed. The two one company barracks each had its own mess hall and kitchen and was occupied by an infantry company each. The two companies barrack located in the center of the quad occupied the Battalion Headquarters Co. and the Machine Gun Co.

By 1953, the U.S. Department of the Army had reached the conclusion that Henry Barracks would be closed in the near future. A full complement of maintenance personnel composed of professional, technical, and daily laborers were maintained in the Reservation. The growth of three major housing developments is evidence of the economic impact of the Reservation (Reparto Montellano, El Polvorin, Urbanización Aponte) While the all-Puerto Rican 65th Infantry regiment would never return to its home base, several other initiatives were undertaken, which had a direct impact on the economic development of the town and the region, one such initiatives was the commissioning of the Caribbean Signal Agency in 1959. Over the coming years several tenants occupied the lands comprised by the Henry Barracks Military Reservation, among them:

- In the company size building to the west of the quad, the National Guard had its Officer Training School in 1965 and 1966. It was later moved to Camp Santiago in Salinas. The golf course was used as a helicopter landing strip.
- YMCA Cuerpos de Paz, and VESPRA (1965–68) had an Administration Building, a swimming pool, a golf course and three houses, which housed the majors and their families.
- The Encampment for Citizenship held its 1966 six-week encampment in the two-company building in the middle of the quad. One hundred fifty-one young leaders from 56 countries from all over the world meet in Cayey to learn to develop self-government and to perform community development projects.
- The Foundation for Community Development moved to the housing is located in the southeastern part of the Post until 1972. Thousands of people received training in community development, and leadership during those years.

== Geography ==
Cayey is located in a valley surrounded by the Sierra de Cayey, a branching mountain range of the Cordillera Central where the Carite Forest Reserve is located, and the main ranges of the Cordillera Central to the west. Because of its location, Cayey is known for its mountains, its cool weather and its misty mornings, especially in winter. During Spanish colonial rule, Spanish soldiers assigned to Puerto Rico were sent to Cayey. Its cool weather resembled the weather of Spain and soldiers could become acclimated to the tropical weather. In winter, it is not unusual for the temperature to drop to 10 °C (50 °F).

The highest point in Cayey is Cerro La Santa, also the highest point of the Sierra de Cayey. Some of the rivers in Cayey include the Guavate, Jájome, La Plata and Maton Rivers.

=== Climate ===
Cayey's climate is humid, rainy and mild compared to lower-elevation areas of the island, the area of the town is nearly 1,500 feet (460 m) high, so the climate is subtropical high. In summer average high Temperatures are around 82 °F (28 °C) to 88 °F (31 °C) and 70 °F (21 °C) to 78 °F (26 °C) in winter, and low around 68 °F (20 °C) to 72 °F (22 °C) in summer and 57 °F (14 °C) to 63 °F (17 °C) in winter. The record maximum temperature is 94 °F (34 °C) and minimum 45 °F (7 °C). The average annual rainfall is 100 inches (2,540 mm) and maximum rainfall record in 24 hours is 20.87 inches (530 mm) of rain.

=== Flora and fauna ===
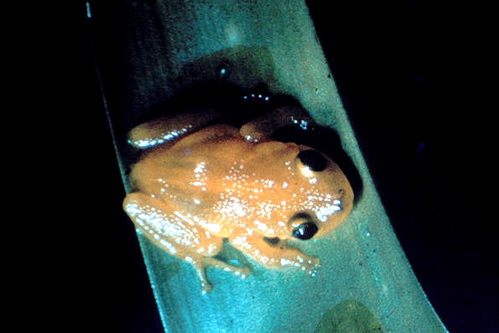
Golden coquí

The golden coquí (Eleutherodactylus jasperi; Spanish: coquí dorado) is a rare and possibly extinct leptodactylid frog species endemic to Puerto Rico. Native to the municipality of Cayey, golden coquís have only been found in areas of dense bromeliad growth in the Sierra de Cayey between 2,123 and 2,575 feet (647 and 785 meters) above sea level. They get their name from the song the male coquis sing at night. The golden coqui is the smallest of the coqui frogs in Puerto Rico. Mature adult coquis are roughly the size of a dime. Male coquis are bright yellow where females tend to be more light yellow and brown. The golden coqui is the only frog species in the New World known to give birth to live young. These frogs are known around the whole island and are considered a symbol of Puerto Rico.

=== Barrios ===
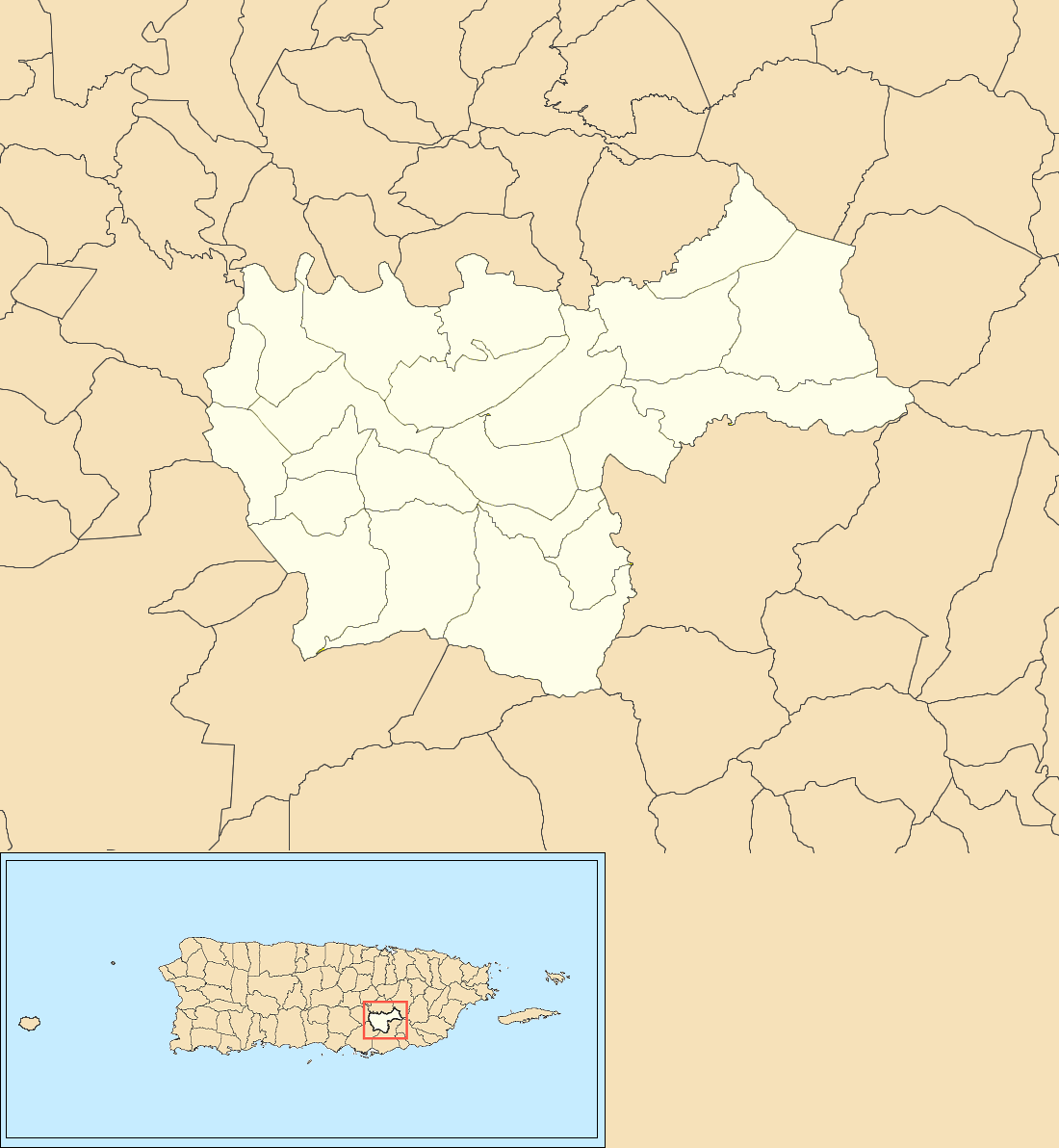
Subdivisions of Cayey

Like all municipalities of Puerto Rico, Cayey is subdivided into barrios. The municipal buildings, central square and large Catholic church are located in a barrio referred to as "el pueblo", near the center of the municipality.

1. Beatriz
2. Cayey barrio-pueblo
3. Cedro
4. Cercadillo
5. Culebras Alto
6. Culebras Bajo
7. Farallón
8. Guavate
9. Jájome Alto
10. Jájome Bajo
11. Lapa
12. Matón Abajo
13. Matón Arriba
14. Monte Llano
15. Pasto Viejo
16. Pedro Ávila
17. Piedras
18. Quebrada Arriba
19. Rincón
20. Sumido
21. Toita
22. Vegas

=== Sectors ===
Barrios (which are, in contemporary times, roughly comparable to minor civil divisions) and subbarrios, are further subdivided into smaller areas called sectores (sectors in English). The types of sectores may vary, from normally sector to urbanización to reparto to barriada to residencial, among others.

=== Special Communities ===
Comunidades Especiales de Puerto Rico (Special Communities of Puerto Rico) are marginalized communities whose citizens are experiencing a certain amount of social exclusion. A map shows these communities occur in nearly every municipality of the commonwealth. Of the 742 places that were on the list in 2014, the following barrios, communities, sectors, or neighborhoods were in Cayey: Parcelas Nuevas in Beatriz, Cantera, Sector Jalda Abajo, Cedro, El Coquí, Jájome Bajo, La Placita, Saint Thomas, San Cristóbal, and La Vega.

=== Buildings and structures ===
==== Telemundo WKAQ TV Tower ====
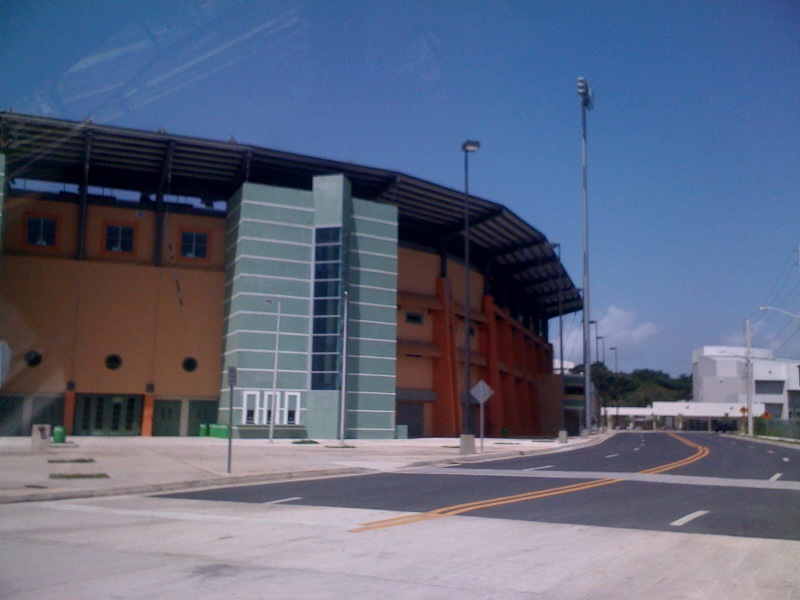
The new Pedro Montañez Municipal Stadium in Cayey

Telemundo WKAQ-TV Tower, situated at 18°6'47"N 66°3'9"W, is a 1,105 feet (336.8 m) tall guyed mast for FM-/TV-broadcasting. It was built in 1971 and it is the second tallest man-made structure of Puerto Rico.

==== Pedro Montañez Stadium ====
The Pedro Montañez Municipal Stadium in Cayey, proceeded by the Ángel Luis Correa Municipal Stadium in Cayey, is the home of the Toritos de Cayey Double-A baseball team, and the Benigno Fernandez Garcia Jr. High School's field day competitions. The stadium is named after famous boxer Pedro Montañez. Outside of the stadium, there are two statues. Near the entrance, there's one of Pedro Montañez and one of one of the most famous and beloved baseball players in Cayey, Luis Raúl "Rolo" Colón. The ballpark holds 6,500 people.

==== Cayey Pegasus Broadcasting WAPA-TV Tower ====
The Cayey Pegasus Broadcasting tower, at coordinates 18°6'33"N and 66°3'2"W is the third-tallest structure in Puerto Rico. It is a guyed mast owned by Hemisphere Media Group with a height of 1,091 feet (332.5 m), which was built in 1966.

== Economy ==
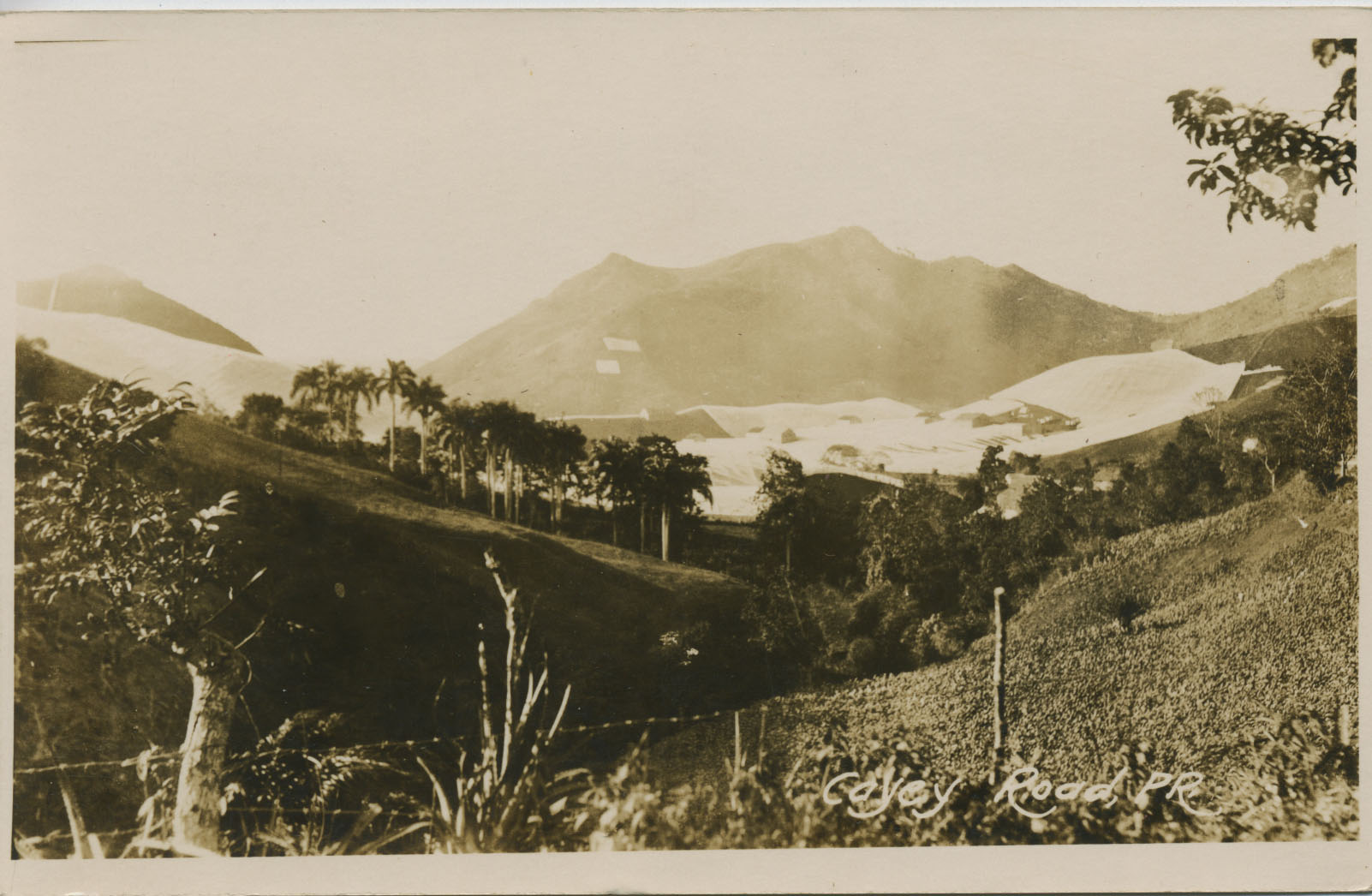
View from road in Cayey, circa 1900–1917

Cayey's economy was based on growing tobacco, sugarcane and general fruits. Its agricultural economy that evolved starting in the 1950s has diminished considerably. Most of its agricultural products are imported from other islands in the Caribbean or mainland United States.

During the first half of the 20th century, Cayey was basically an agricultural area of small farmers and local haciendas dedicated to the farming of crops for the local market. During the 1920s and 1930s farmers increasingly lost their land to absentee landowners, mostly American companies, that turned to the cultivation of sugarcane and, to a lesser extent, tobacco for export. In the 1950s and 1960s some manufacturing concerns established plants in Cayey taking advantage of tax incentives offered by Operation Bootstrap, Puerto Rico's industrialization program.

An industrial base, in 1947 Cayey saw the beginning of industrial entrepreneurship. There were three factories in town, the Caribe Flower Co. in the Palo Seco neighborhood, a Baseball Factory in the Toita neighborhood, and a Uniform Factory in the back of the High School. These factories employed mostly females. By 1950 the men that worked agriculture became excess population and began migrating to the United States or join the military. In 1950 with the approval of Fomento Industrial and Operation Bootstrap there was a boom of light factories in Cayey. The Gordonshire Knitting Mill in the Guayama road had twelve large buildings and ran two shifts with more than 1,000 employees, and the Consolidated Cigar Corporation across from the road from the Reparto Montellano neighborhood operated three shifts employing over 2,500 from Cayey and surrounding towns.

There is a Coca-Cola bottling location in Cayey.

=== Crime in Cayey ===
The Cayey Massacre, in 1994, took place partly in Cayey.

In August 2019, El Vocero newspaper reported there had been three mass shootings, that year, in Cayey.

== Tourism ==
To stimulate local tourism, the Puerto Rico Tourism Company launched the Voy Turistiendo ("I'm Touring") campaign, with a passport book and website. The Cayey page lists the "gastronomic route" in Guavate barrio, Casa del Cuento y la Historia Cayeyana Ramón "Moncho" Gomez, Bosque de Pinos, and agrotourism at Siempre Verde, as places of interest.

Cayey is a mountainous municipality with many places of interest.

=== Landmarks and places of interest ===
There are seven places in Cayey listed on the US National Register of Historic Places:

- Casa de Juana Rodríguez Morales
- Church Nuestra Señora de la Asunción of Cayey
- La Liendre Bridge
- Arenas Bridge
- Carretera Central
- Río Matón Bridge
- Carretera No. 4 (today PR-15) including the Principe Alfonso XII Bridge.

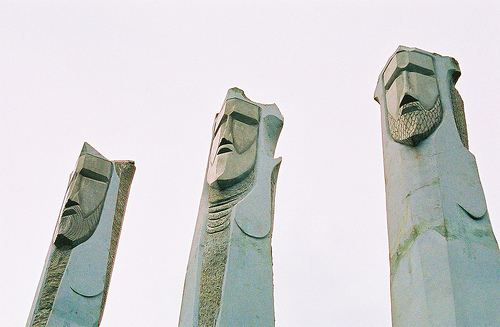
Monument to The Three Kings in Guavate

Other landmarks, landscapes and places of interest are:

- La Robleda Protected Natural Area
- Comsat Station
- Ramón Frade Exhibit
- Brisas De Cayey
- Monumento a Los Tres Reyes Magos
- Carite Forest
- Lago Carite
- Escuela de Bellas Artes
- El Salón de La Fama del Deporte
- El Faro del Saber
- University of Puerto Rico at Cayey
- Museo de Arte Pio López
- Pedro Montañez Municipal Stadium
- Teatro Municipal
- Banda Municipal de Cayey
- Tuna de Cayey
- Casino Real

== Culture ==
=== Festivals and events ===
Cayey celebrates its patron saint festival in August. The Fiestas Patronales Nuestra Señora de Asunción is a religious and cultural celebration that generally features parades, games, artisans, amusement rides, regional food, and live entertainment. The festival has featured live performances by well-known artists such as Grupo Mania, Sonora Ponceña, José Alberto "El Canario", Lalo Rodriguez, Ednita Nazario, and El Gran Combo de Puerto Rico.

Other festivals and events celebrated in Cayey include:

- Regional Fair – April
- Torito Olympics – April

== Demographics ==
Historical population
Census	Pop.	Note	%±
1900	14,442		—
1910	17,711		22.6%
1920	23,618		33.4%
1930	28,797		21.9%
1940	31,391		9.0%
1950	36,656		16.8%
1960	38,061		3.8%
1970	38,432		1.0%
1980	41,099		6.9%
1990	46,553		13.3%
2000	47,370		1.8%
2010	48,119		1.6%
2020	41,652		−13.4%
2025 (est.)	40,027	▼	−3.9%
U.S. Decennial Census; 1899 (shown as 1900) 1910–1930; 1930–1950 1960–2000 2010 2020

Race – Cayey, Puerto Rico – 2000 Census
Race	Population	% of Total
White	41,771	88.2%
Black/African American	1,834	3.9%
American Indian and Alaska Native	89	0.2%
Asian	64	0.1%
Native Hawaiian/Pacific Islander	24	0.1%
Some other race	2,602	5.5%
Two or more races	986	2.1%

== Government ==
All municipalities in Puerto Rico are administered by a mayor, elected every four years. The current mayor of Cayey is Rolando Ortíz, of the Popular Democratic Party (PPD). He was elected at the 1996 general elections and has remained in office through all intervening elections since.

The city belongs to the Puerto Rico Senatorial district VI, which is represented by two Senators. In 2024, Rafael Santos Ortiz and Wilmer Reyes Berríos were elected as District Senators.

== Symbols ==
The municipio has an official flag and coat of arms.

=== Flag ===
The flag derives its design and colors from the coat of arms, which is in the center of the flag encircled by a solid black ring. The centered coat of arms and has four triangles pointing to it, two white and two red.

=== Coat of arms ===
The coat of arms has a three tip mountain, a red bull, and a waving blue stripe representing the abundant water in the zone and also in reverence to the primitive matron of the town of Cayey. The shield is topped with the silver lamb symbol of San Juan of Puerto Rico, and a red book.

== Transportation ==
Puerto Rico Highway 52 in red.

Cayey has direct access to Puerto Rico Highway 52 and its downtown/business area is served by Puerto Rico Highway 14, which grants access to Aibonito to the west and is the main route to the University of Puerto Rico in town, and by Puerto Rico Highway 15 which grants access to south Cayey and Guayama. Puerto Rico Highway 1 Bypass runs through the town's business area. The municipality has good paved roads and is easily accessible from San Juan, being only 25 miles (40 kilometers) away, as well as from Ponce, being only 38 mi (61 km) away. Due to its proximity to Caguas and easy access via PR-52, Cayey has seen significant growth in the last years.

There are 82 bridges in Cayey many of which travel over Rio de la Plata.

== Education ==
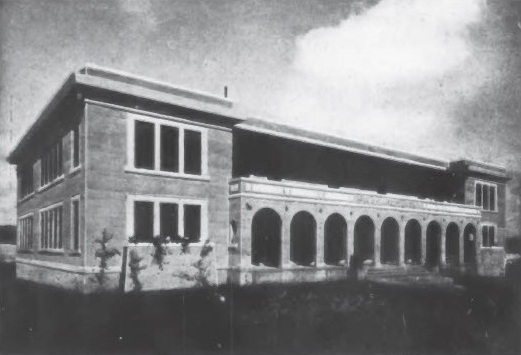
A twelve-room school in Cayey, c. 1920

The following schools are in Cayey:

- Benigno Carrion grades: K – 5
- Benigno Fernandez Garcia Middle School grades: 6 – 8
- Benjamin Harrison High School grades: 9 – 12
- Centro Adiest. Vocacional Gabriel Bibiloni
- Dr. Ramon Emeterio Betances grades: 6 – 8
- Emerita Leon Elemental grades: PK – 6
- Especializada de Bellas Artes grades: 7 – 12
- Miguel Melendez Muñoz grades: 9 – 12
- Salvador Brau Elemental grades: K – 5
- Su Certenejas II grades: K – 8
- Su Eugenio Maria de Hostos grades: K – 8
- Su Gerardo Selles Sola grades: K – 8
- Virginia Vazquez Mendoza grades: K – 5
- Radians School: PK - 12

=== Higher education ===
- University of Puerto Rico at Cayey
- University of Turabo at Cayey
- Instituto de Banca y Comercio (satellite campus at Cayey)
- Liberty Technical College

== Health care ==
- Hospital Menonita de Cayey
- Hospital Municipal de Cayey

== Notable natives and residents ==
- Alexis y Fido, reggaeton duo
- Ricardo Aponte, brigadier general, USAF
- Frankie Cutlass, artist, DJ, producer
- Raymond Arrieta, comedian
- Hiram Burgos, MLB player, retired pitcher Milwaukee Brewers
- Christian Colón, MLB player, 2015 World Series champion
- Ramón Frade, visual artist/painter
- Luis Guzmán, actor
- Kandy Ho, drag queen
- Jorge López, birthplace of star Baltimore Orioles pitcher
- Alberto Mercado, boxer, resides in Cayey
- Pedro Montañez, professional boxer
- Joseph O. Prewitt Díaz, psychologist, recipient of the APA International Humanitarian Award 2008
- Amazing Red, pro wrestler
- Zuleyka Rivera, Miss Puerto Rico Universe 2006, Miss Universe 2006
- Marcelino Sánchez, actor
- Wisin & Yandel, reggaeton group
- José Ortiz, basketball player, former NBA Player
- Lionel Fernández Méndez, politician and senator of Cayey and the District of Guayama

== Sister cities ==
- Middletown, Connecticut
- Melilli, Sicily, Italy

== Gallery ==
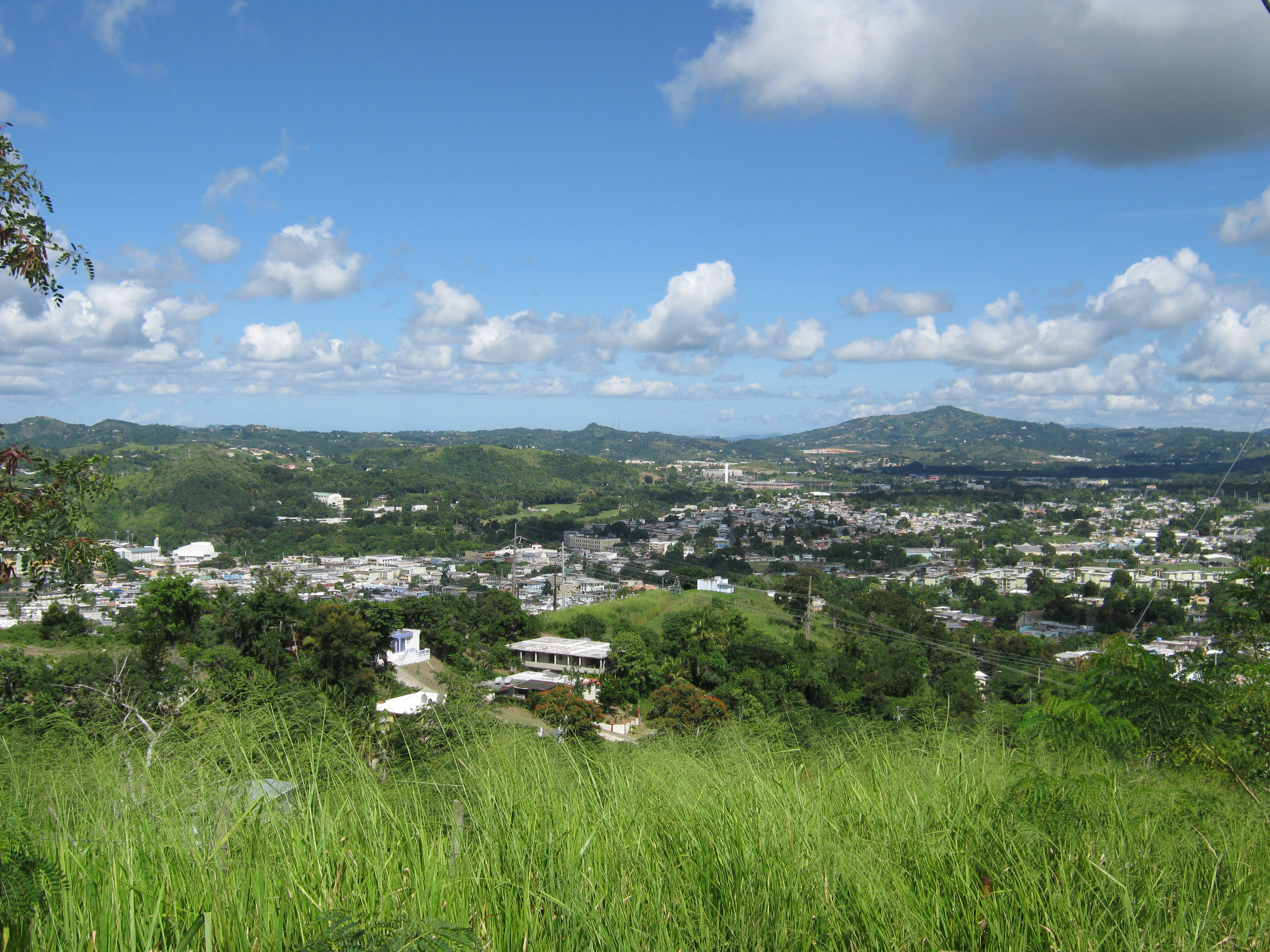
Eastern side of Cayey

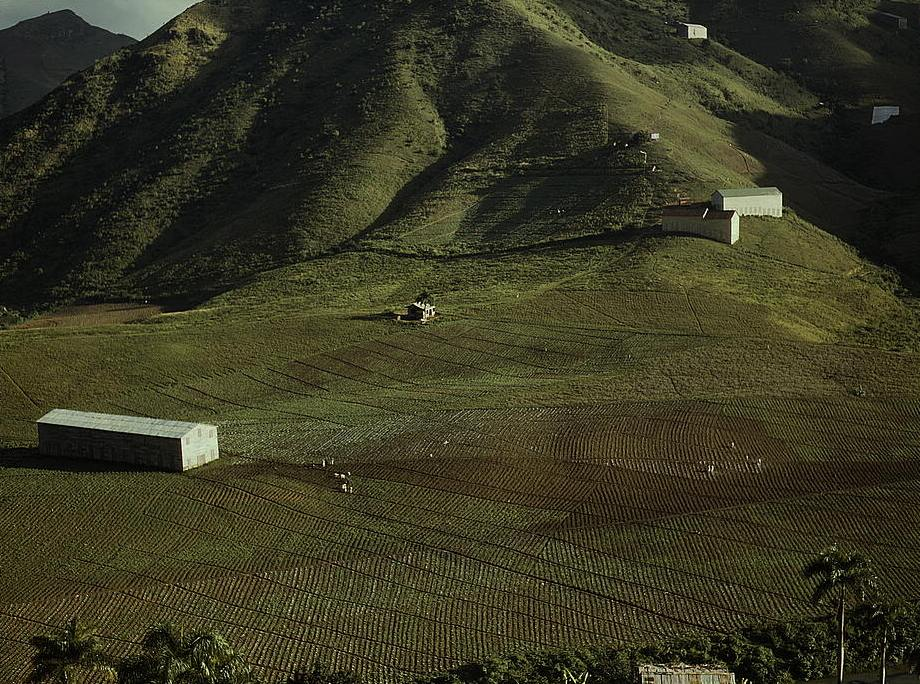
Cultivating tobacco in Cayey in 1941

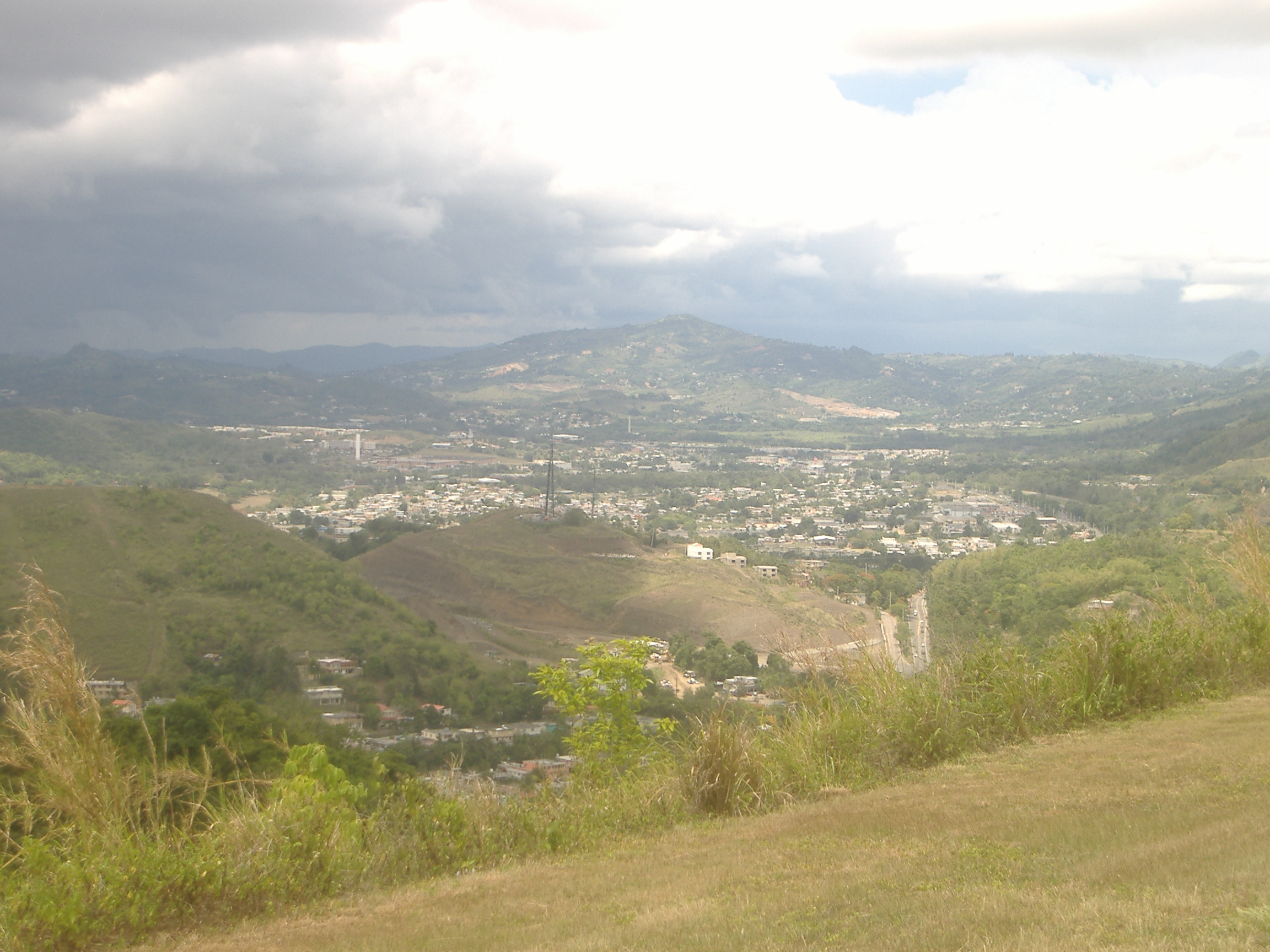
Cayey landscape from PR-52

== See also ==
- National Register of Historic Places listings in Cayey, Puerto Rico
- History of Puerto Rico
- List of Puerto Ricans
