= Sumido, Cayey, Puerto Rico =

Barrio of Puerto Rico

Sumido
- Barrio
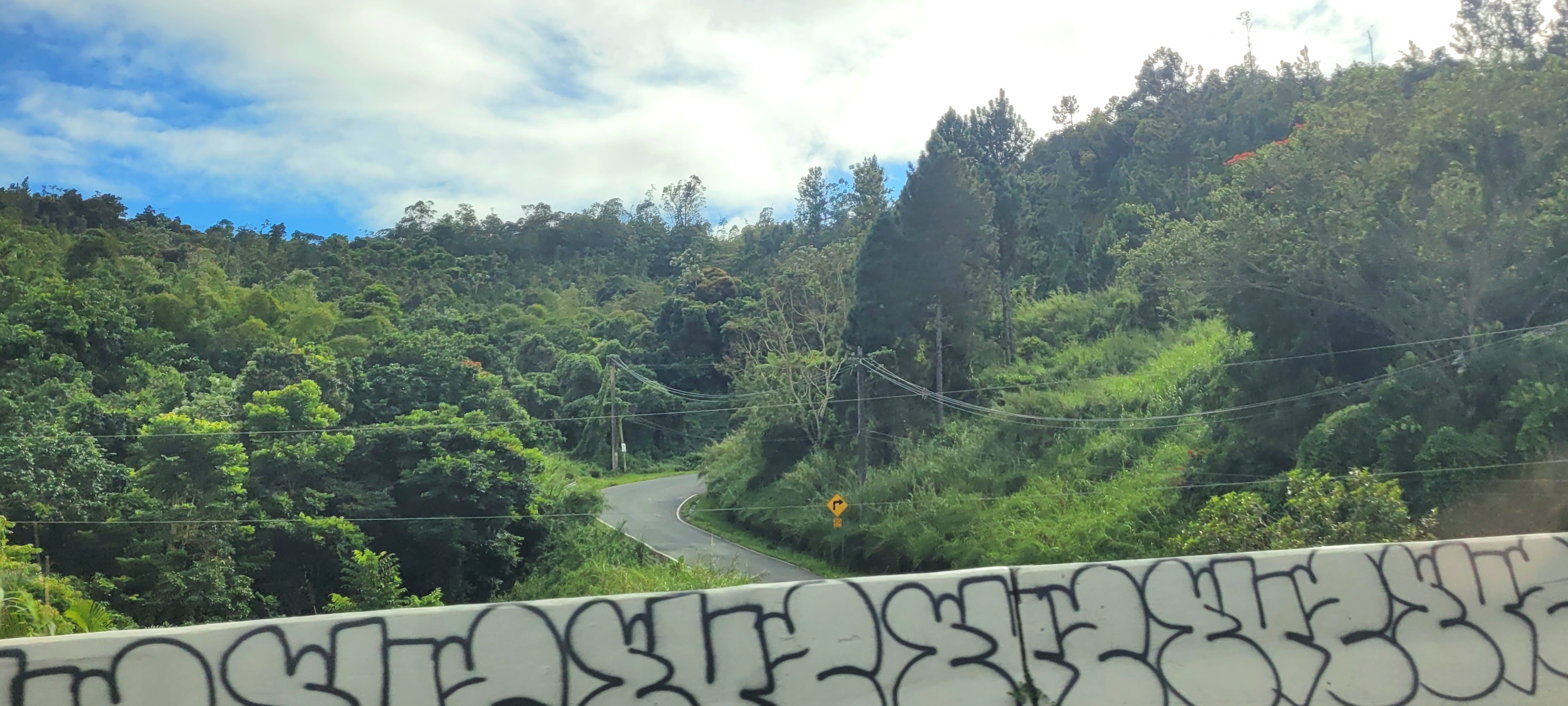
- Puerto Rico Highway 715 from Puerto Rico Highway 52 in Sumido

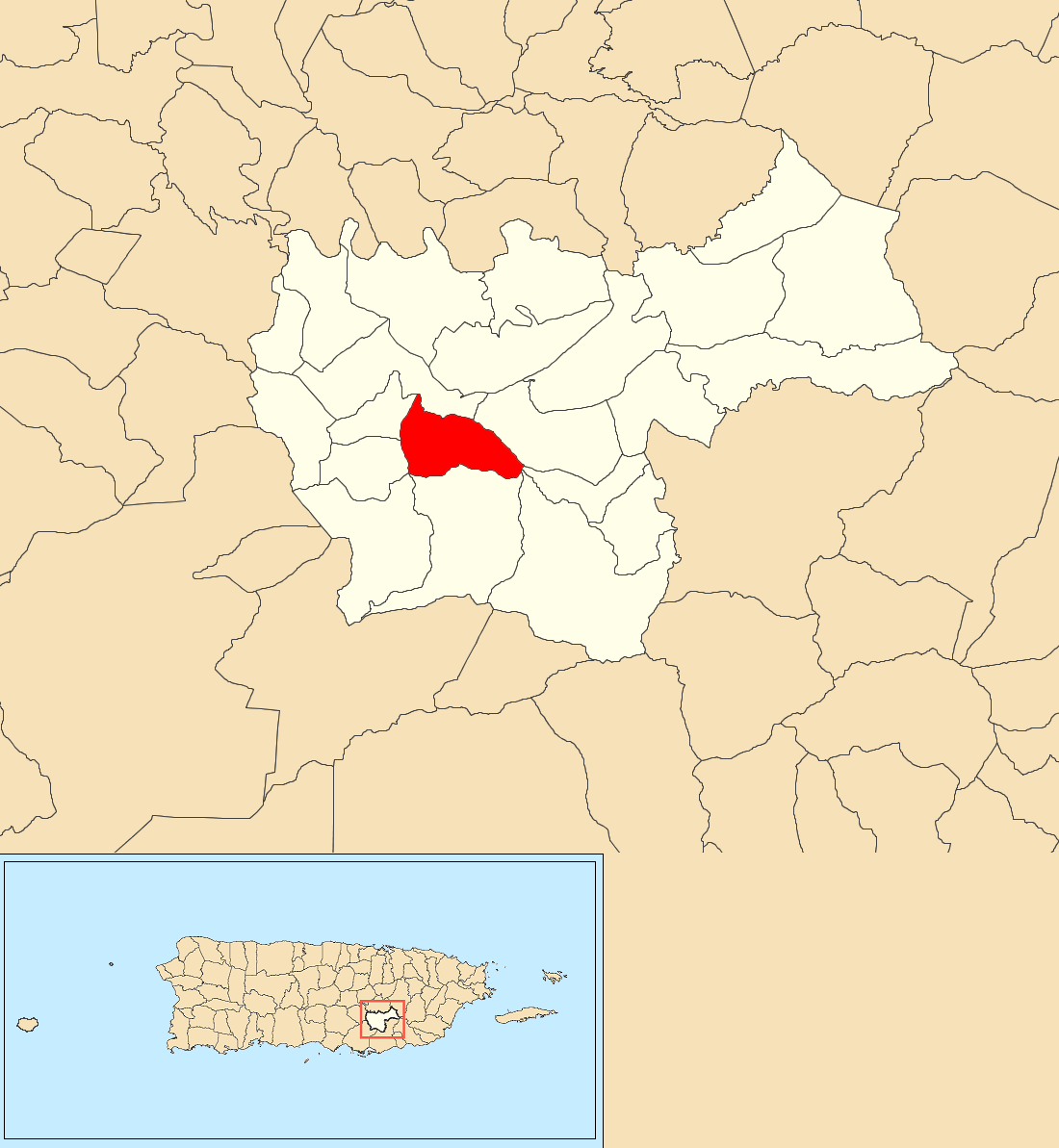
- Location of Sumido within the municipality of Cayey shown in red

- Location of Puerto Rico
- Coordinates: 18°05′20″N 66°10′22″W
- Commonwealth: Puerto Rico
- Municipality: Cayey

Area
  - Total: 1.6 sq mi (4.1 km^{2})
  - Land: 1.6 sq mi (4.1 km^{2})
  - Water: 0 sq mi (0 km^{2})
- Elevation: 1,896 ft (578 m)

Population (2010)
  - Total: 802
  - Density: 501.3/sq mi (193.6/km^{2})
- Source: 2010 Census
- Time zone: UTC−4 (AST)

Sumido is a barrio in the municipality of Cayey, Puerto Rico. Its population in 2010 was 802.

== History ==
Sumido was in Spain's gazetteers until Puerto Rico was ceded by Spain in the aftermath of the Spanish–American War under the terms of the Treaty of Paris of 1898 and became an unincorporated territory of the United States. In 1899, the United States Department of War conducted a census of Puerto Rico finding that the combined population of Sumido and Jájome Bajo barrios was 961.

Historical population
Census	Pop.	Note	%±
1910	354		—
1920	520		46.9%
1930	586		12.7%
1940	515		−12.1%
1950	427		−17.1%
1960	528		23.7%
1970	689		30.5%
1980	497		−27.9%
1990	691		39.0%
2000	729		5.5%
2010	802		10.0%
U.S. Decennial Census; 1900 (N/A) 1910-1930; 1930-1950 1980-2000 2010

== See also ==
- List of communities in Puerto Rico
