= Matón Arriba, Cayey, Puerto Rico =

Barrio of Puerto Rico

Matón Arriba
- Barrio
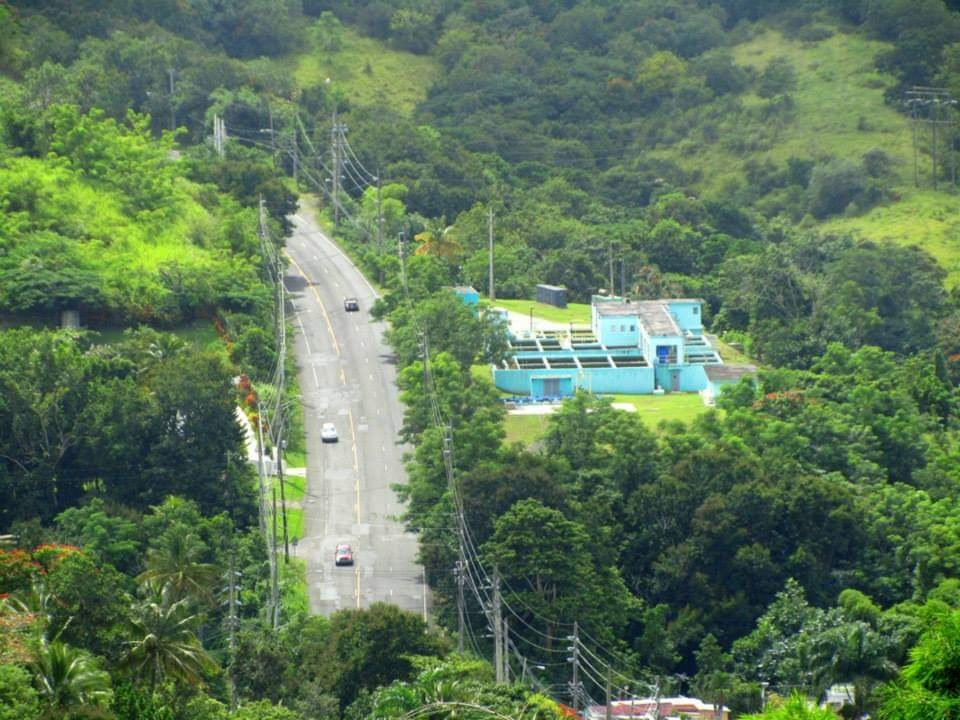
- Puerto Rico Highway 1 between Matón Arriba and Cayey barrio-pueblo

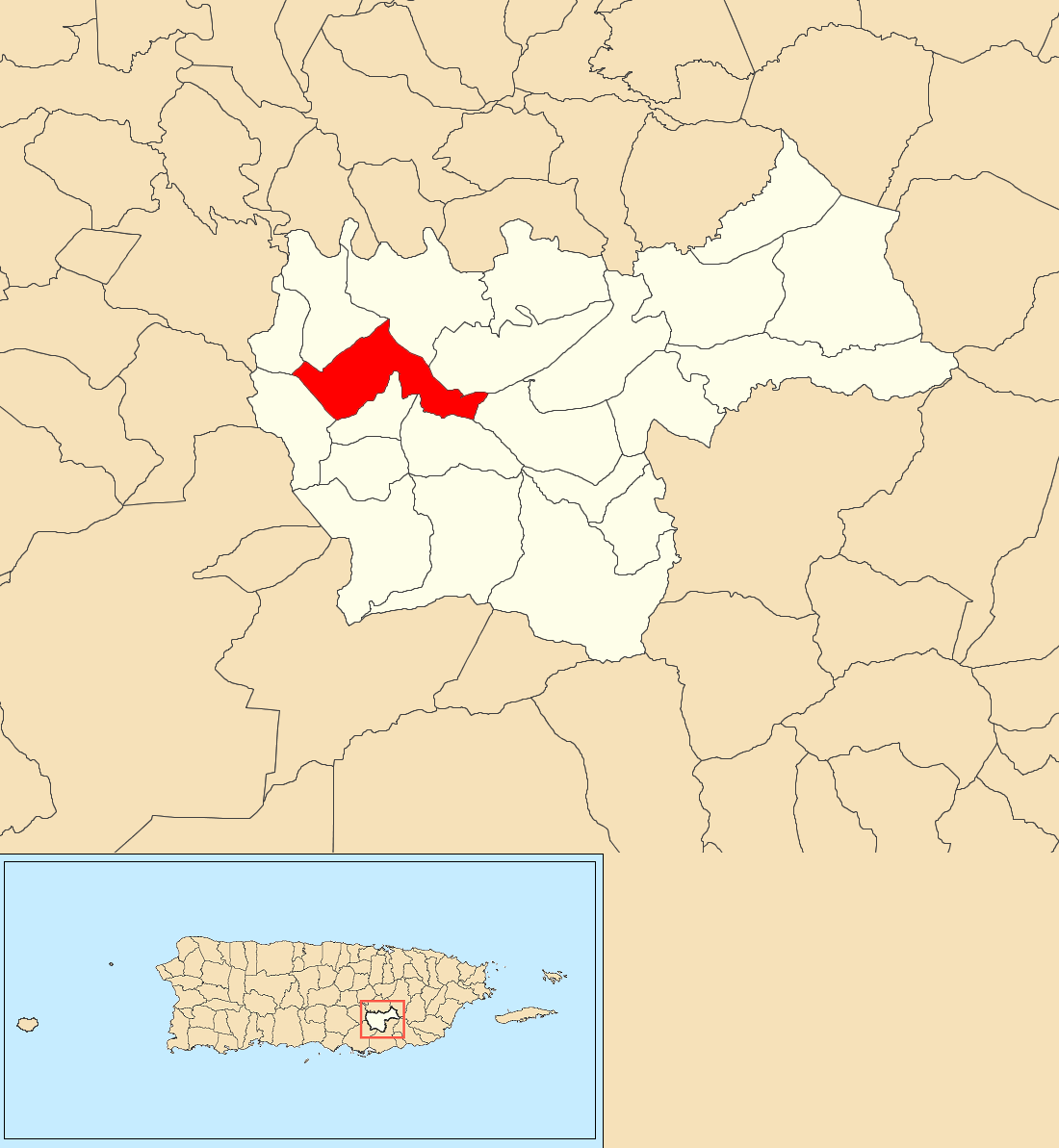
- Location of Matón Arriba within the municipality of Cayey shown in red

- Location of Puerto Rico
- Coordinates: 18°06′27″N 66°11′53″W
- Commonwealth: Puerto Rico
- Municipality: Cayey

Area
  - Total: 2.19 sq mi (5.7 km^{2})
  - Land: 2.19 sq mi (5.7 km^{2})
  - Water: 0 sq mi (0 km^{2})
- Elevation: 1,604 ft (489 m)

Population (2010)
  - Total: 961
  - Density: 438.8/sq mi (169.4/km^{2})
- Source: 2010 Census
- Time zone: UTC−4 (AST)

Matón Arriba is a barrio in the municipality of Cayey, Puerto Rico. Its population in 2010 was 961.

== History ==
Matón Arriba was in Spain's gazetteers until Puerto Rico was ceded by Spain in the aftermath of the Spanish–American War under the terms of the Treaty of Paris of 1898 and became an unincorporated territory of the United States. In 1899, the United States Department of War conducted a census of Puerto Rico finding that the combined population of Matón Arriba and Toíta barrios was 1,390.

Historical population
Census	Pop.	Note	%±
1910	809		—
1920	1,528		88.9%
1930	1,603		4.9%
1940	1,806		12.7%
1950	665		−63.2%
1960	584		−12.2%
1970	868		48.6%
1980	558		−35.7%
1990	784		40.5%
2000	1,034		31.9%
2010	961		−7.1%
U.S. Decennial Census; 1900 (N/A) 1910-1930; 1930-1950 1980-2000 2010

== See also ==
- List of communities in Puerto Rico
