= Cercadillo, Cayey, Puerto Rico =

Barrio of Puerto Rico

Cercadillo
- Barrio
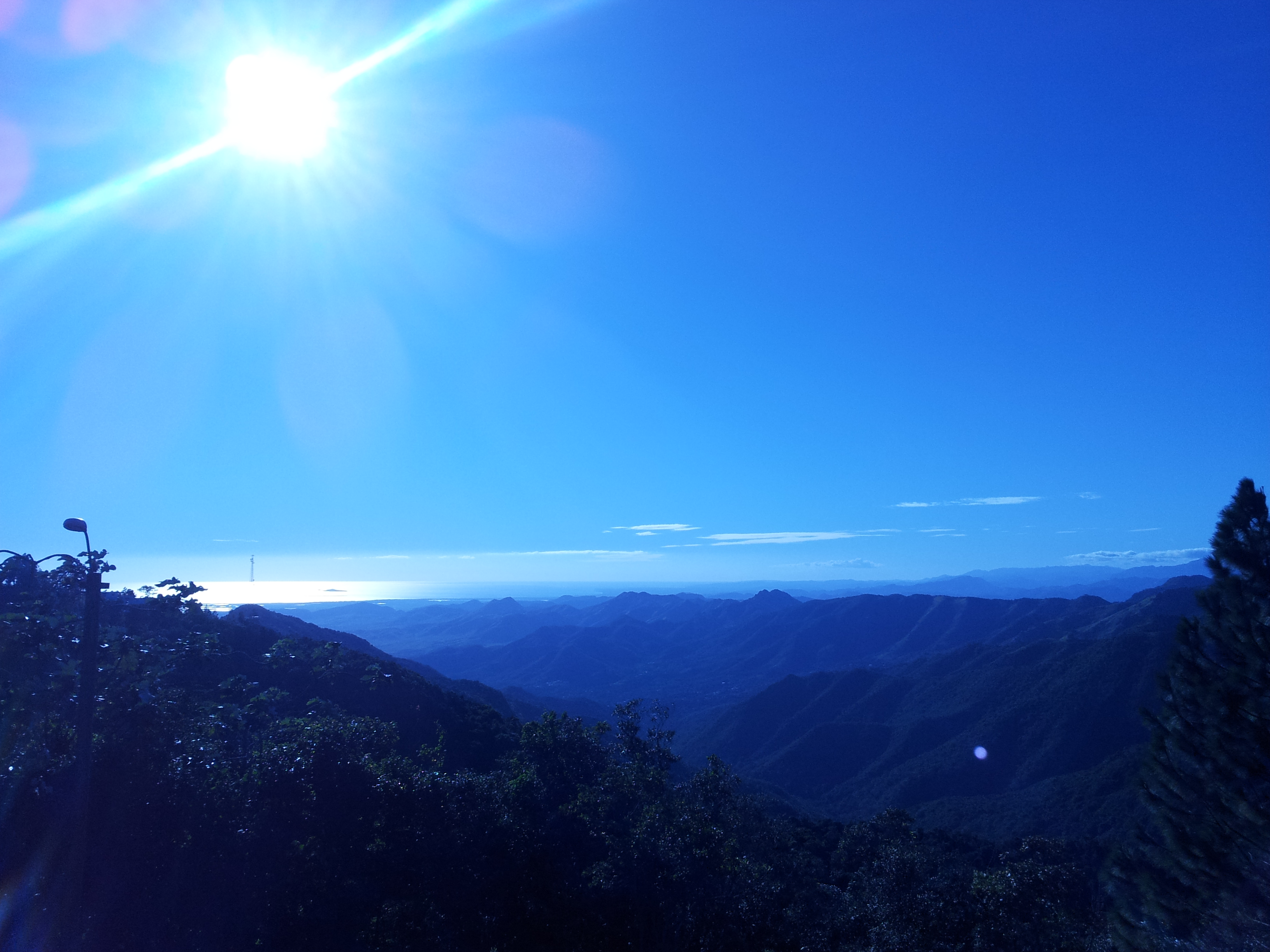
- Cercadillo mountain view

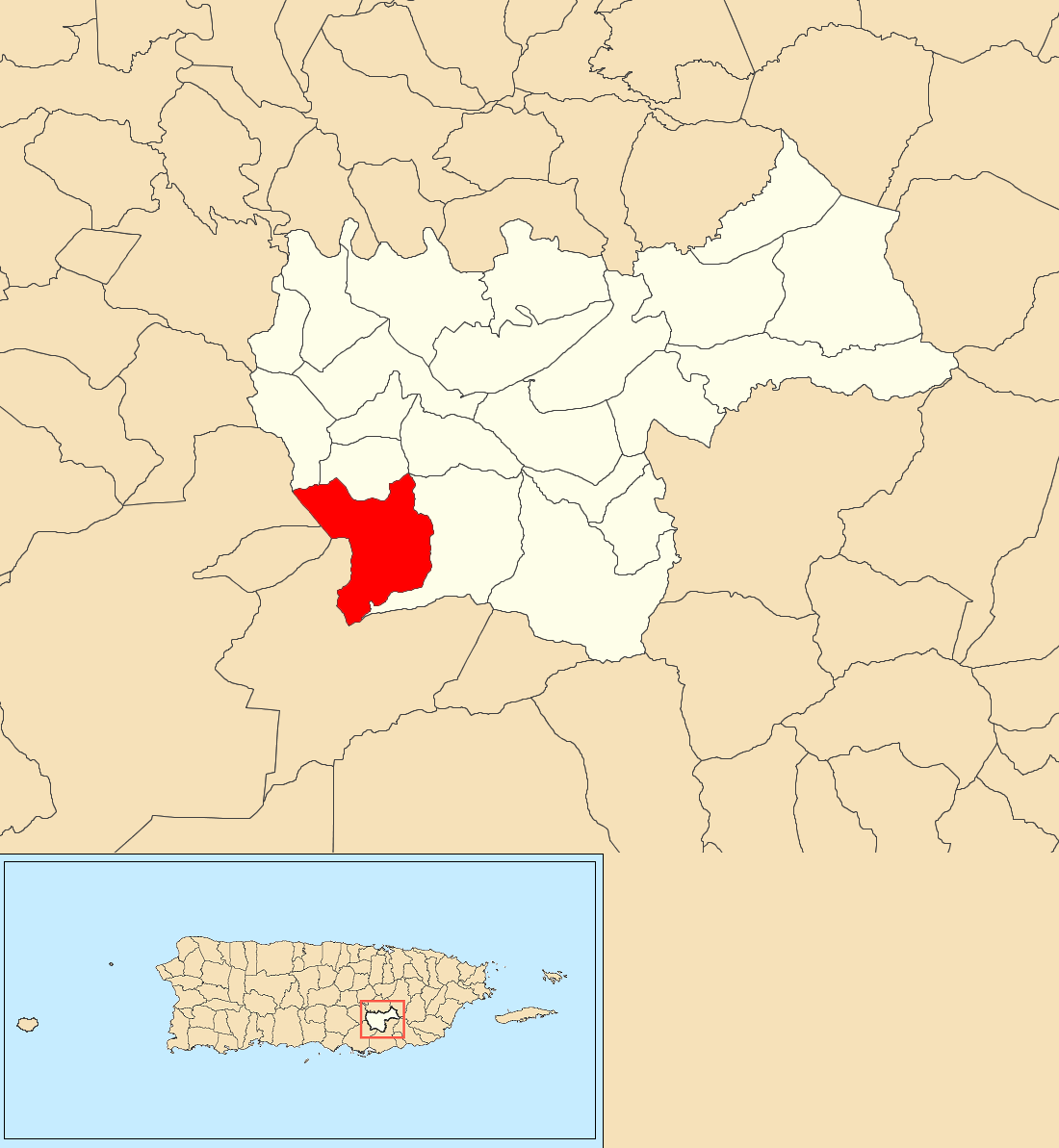
- Location of Cercadillo within the municipality of Cayey shown in red

- Location of Puerto Rico
- Coordinates: 18°04′01″N 66°11′44″W
- Commonwealth: Puerto Rico
- Municipality: Cayey

Area
  - Total: 2.98 sq mi (7.7 km^{2})
  - Land: 2.98 sq mi (7.7 km^{2})
  - Water: 0 sq mi (0 km^{2})
- Elevation: 2,398 ft (731 m)

Population (2010)
  - Total: 820
  - Density: 275.2/sq mi (106.3/km^{2})
- Source: 2010 Census
- Time zone: UTC−4 (AST)

Cercadillo is a barrio in the municipality of Cayey, Puerto Rico. Its population in 2010 was 820.

== History ==
Cercadillo was in Spain's gazetteers until Puerto Rico was ceded by Spain in the aftermath of the Spanish–American War under the terms of the Treaty of Paris of 1898 and became an unincorporated territory of the United States. In 1899, the United States Department of War conducted a census of Puerto Rico finding that the combined population of Cercadillo and Lapa barrios was 1,047.

Historical population
Census	Pop.	Note	%±
1910	692		—
1920	642		−7.2%
1930	701		9.2%
1940	598		−14.7%
1950	542		−9.4%
1960	343		−36.7%
1970	369		7.6%
1980	228		−38.2%
1990	432		89.5%
2000	827		91.4%
2010	820		−0.8%
U.S. Decennial Census; 1900 (N/A) 1910-1930; 1930-1950 1980-2000 2010

== See also ==
- List of communities in Puerto Rico
