= Toíta, Cayey, Puerto Rico =

Barrio of Puerto Rico

Toíta
- Barrio
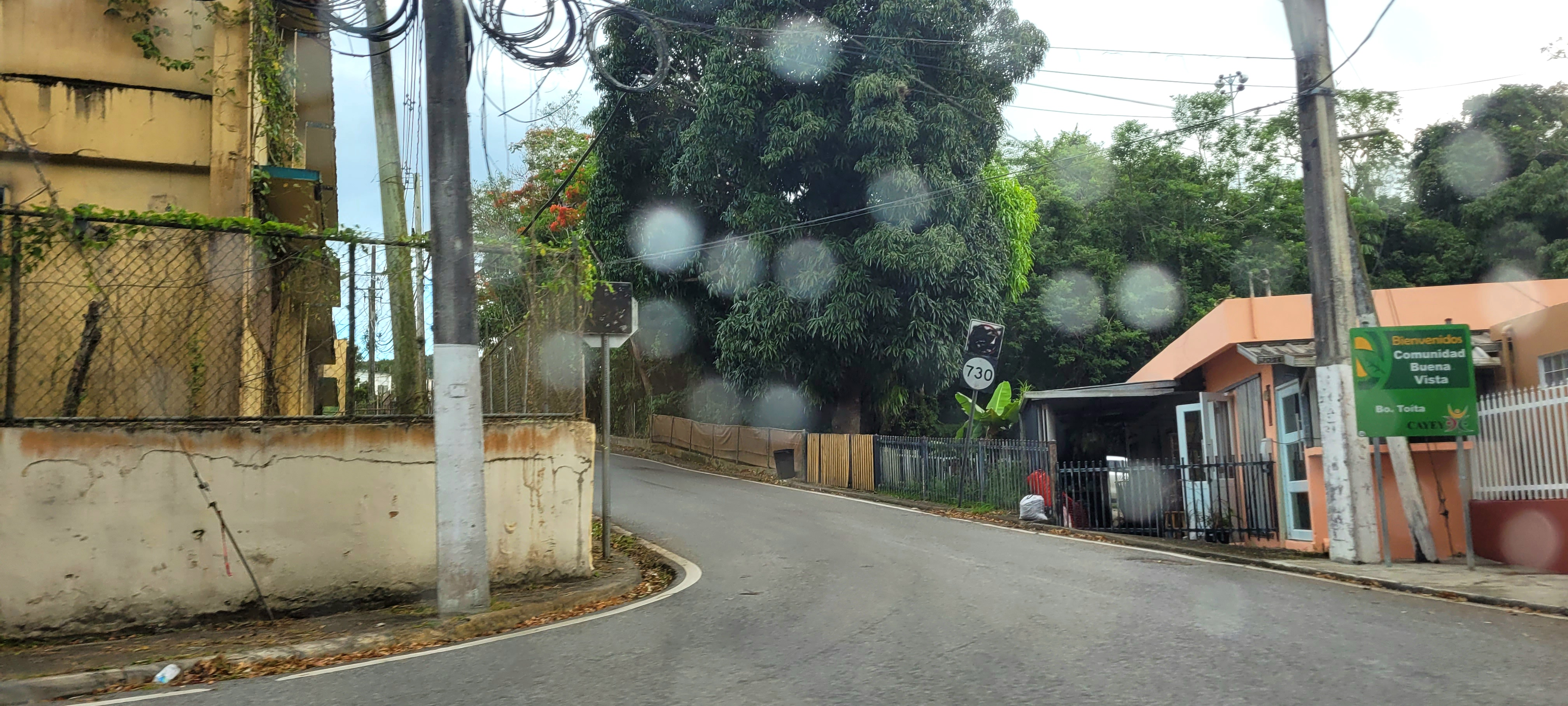
- Puerto Rico Highway 730 in Toíta

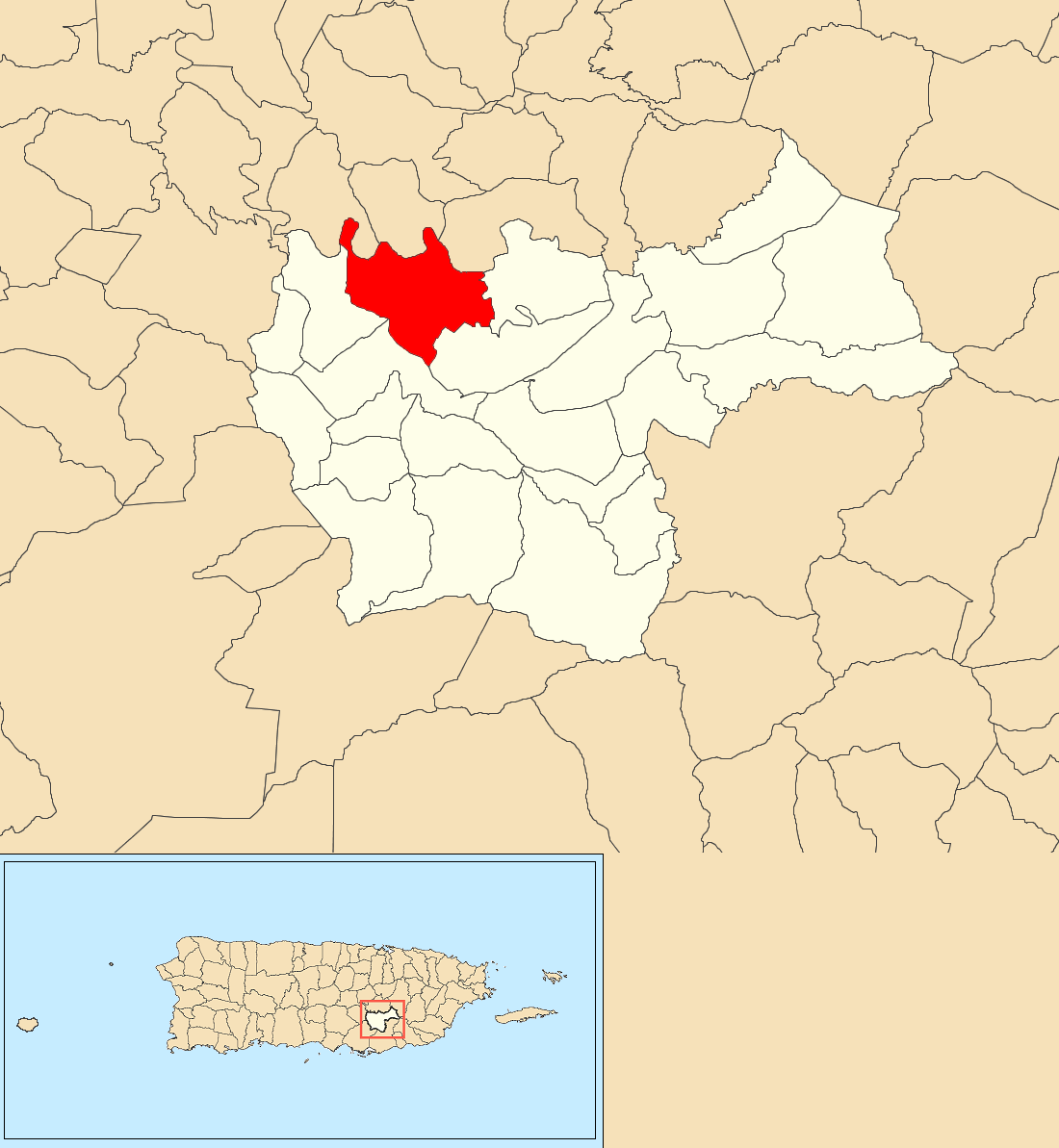
- Location of Toíta within the municipality of Cayey shown in red

- Location of Puerto Rico
- Coordinates: 18°07′45″N 66°10′59″W
- Commonwealth: Puerto Rico
- Municipality: Cayey

Area
  - Total: 3.01 sq mi (7.8 km^{2})
  - Land: 3.01 sq mi (7.8 km^{2})
  - Water: 0 sq mi (0 km^{2})
- Elevation: 1,362 ft (415 m)

Population (2010)
  - Total: 5,281
  - Density: 1,754.5/sq mi (677.4/km^{2})
- Source: 2010 Census
- Time zone: UTC−4 (AST)

Toíta is a barrio in the municipality of Cayey, Puerto Rico. Its population in 2010 was 5,281.

== History ==
Toíta was in Spain's gazetteers until Puerto Rico was ceded by Spain in the aftermath of the Spanish–American War under the terms of the Treaty of Paris of 1898 and became an unincorporated territory of the United States. In 1899, the United States Department of War conducted a census of Puerto Rico finding that the combined population of Toíta and Matón Arriba barrios was 1,390.

Historical population
Census	Pop.	Note	%±
1910	1,979		—
1920	3,136		58.5%
1930	3,451		10.0%
1940	4,931		42.9%
1950	3,224		−34.6%
1960	3,972		23.2%
1970	0		−100.0%
1980	5,868		—
1990	5,861		−0.1%
2000	6,291		7.3%
2010	5,281		−16.1%
U.S. Decennial Census; 1900 (N/A) 1910-1930; 1930-1950 1980-2000 2010

== See also ==
- List of communities in Puerto Rico
