= Puerto Rico Highway 171 =

Highway in Puerto Rico

Highway 171
- Ruta 171

Route information
- Maintained by Puerto Rico DTPW
- Length: 8.3 km (5.2 mi)
- Existed: 1953–present

Major junctions
- South end: PR-14 in Cayey barrio-pueblo
- PR-7731 in Rincón; PR-7731 in Rincón; PR-709 in Rincón; PR-733 in Rincón; PR-7733 in Sud
- North end: PR-172 / PR-734 in Cidra barrio-pueblo

Location
- Country: United States
- Territory: Puerto Rico
- Municipalities: Cayey, Cidra

Highway system
- Roads in Puerto Rico; List
← PR-170	→ PR-172

Puerto Rico Highway 171 (PR-171) is a road that travels from Cidra, Puerto Rico to Cayey. It begins at its intersection with PR-172 in downtown Cidra and ends at its junction with PR-14 near downtown Cayey.

== Major intersections ==
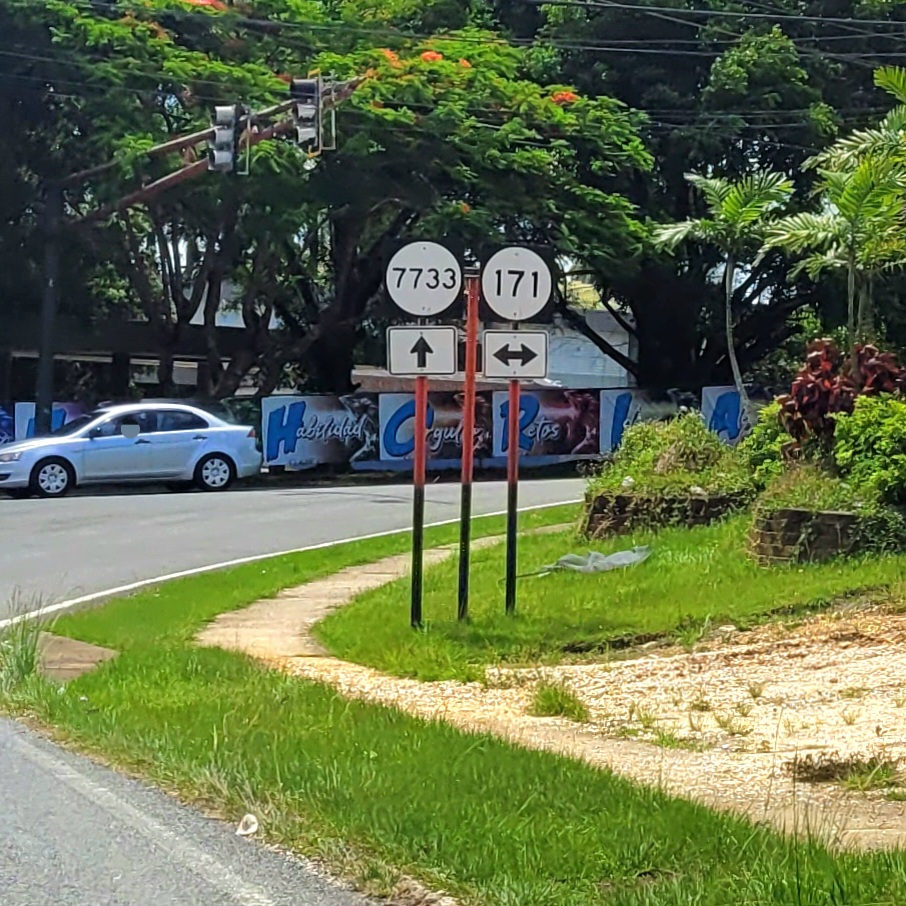
PR-7733 west at PR-171 junction in Sud, Cidra

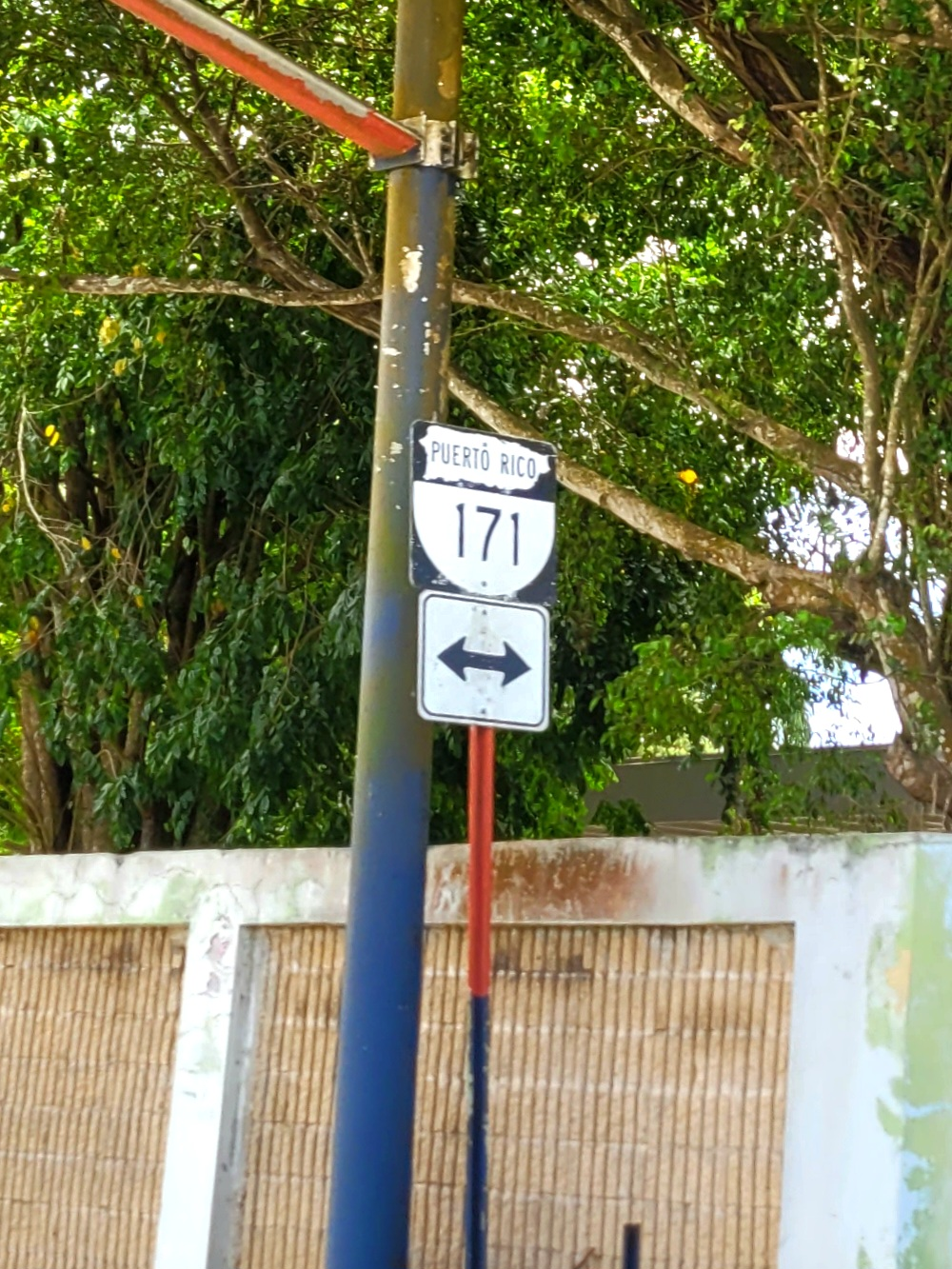
Sign for PR-171 at PR-7733 junction in Sud, Cidra

Municipality	Location	km	mi	Destinations	Notes
Cayey	Cayey barrio-pueblo	8.3	5.2	PR-14 – Cayey	Southern terminus of PR-171
Cayey	Rincón	6.1	3.8	PR-7731 – Rincón	
Cidra	Rincón	5.4	3.4	PR-7731 – Rincón	
Cidra	Rincón	4.6	2.9	PR-709 – Nogueras	
Cidra	Rincón	4.2– 4.1	2.6– 2.5	PR-733 – Rincón	
Cidra	Sud	0.6	0.37	PR-7733 (Avenida de la Eterna Primavera) – Cidra	
Cidra	Cidra barrio-pueblo	0.0	0.0	PR-172 / PR-734 south (Calle José de Diego) – Comerío, Caguas, Cayey	Northern terminus of PR-171
1.000 mi = 1.609 km; 1.000 km = 0.621 mi

== See also ==
- 1953 Puerto Rico highway renumbering
