= Puerto Rico Highway 172 =

Highway in Puerto Rico

Highway 172
- Ruta 172

Route information
- Maintained by Puerto Rico DTPW
- Length: 28.3 km (17.6 mi)
- Existed: 1953–present

Major junctions
- West end: PR-156 in Naranjo
- PR-7774 in Vega Redonda; PR-7733 in Río Abajo–Ceiba–Rabanal; PR-173 in Cidra barrio-pueblo; PR-171 / PR-734 in Cidra barrio-pueblo; PR-7733 in Bayamón–Arenas; PR-787 in Arenas–Bayamón; PR-785 in Cañaboncito; PR-784 in Cañaboncito; PR-52 in Turabo–Cañaboncito; PR-32 in Cañaboncito–Turabo
- East end: PR-1 in Caguas barrio-pueblo

Location
- Country: United States
- Territory: Puerto Rico
- Municipalities: Comerío, Cidra, Caguas

Highway system
- Roads in Puerto Rico; List
| ← PR-171 | → PR-173 |

Puerto Rico Highway 172 (PR-172) is a secondary highway that connects Caguas, Puerto Rico at PR-1 to downtown Cidra, Puerto Rico and continues its way to its end at Puerto Rico Road 156 in Comerío, Puerto Rico. It is a two-lane per direction road from Caguas to its border point to Cidra and rural all the way to Comerío.

== Route description ==
=== Dangerous highway ===
Puerto Rico Highway 172 has about 4 kilometers going uphill. One side of the road is extremely close to the blasted mountain (See Blasting), meaning that landslides would fall in the right lane of the direction close to it; the other side is near a precipice, with barriers that are not safe. The two directions are not divided, and cars can easily collide head-on. Several people have died on this highway, including cars which have been hit by heavy-weight trucks coming down the hill, with brakes that malfunction or in the case of not having enough time to stop. A death occurred on August 16, 2014. There is one emergency ramp which was built to provide safety for the lane going down the mountain.

=== Rural road in Cidra ===
Similar to other highways in Puerto Rico which become rural after entering another town from the town of origin, PR-172 becomes rural and enters downtown Cidra before continuing to its end at PR-156 in Comerío. It is mainly flat, and there are no precipices found on the rest of the highway.

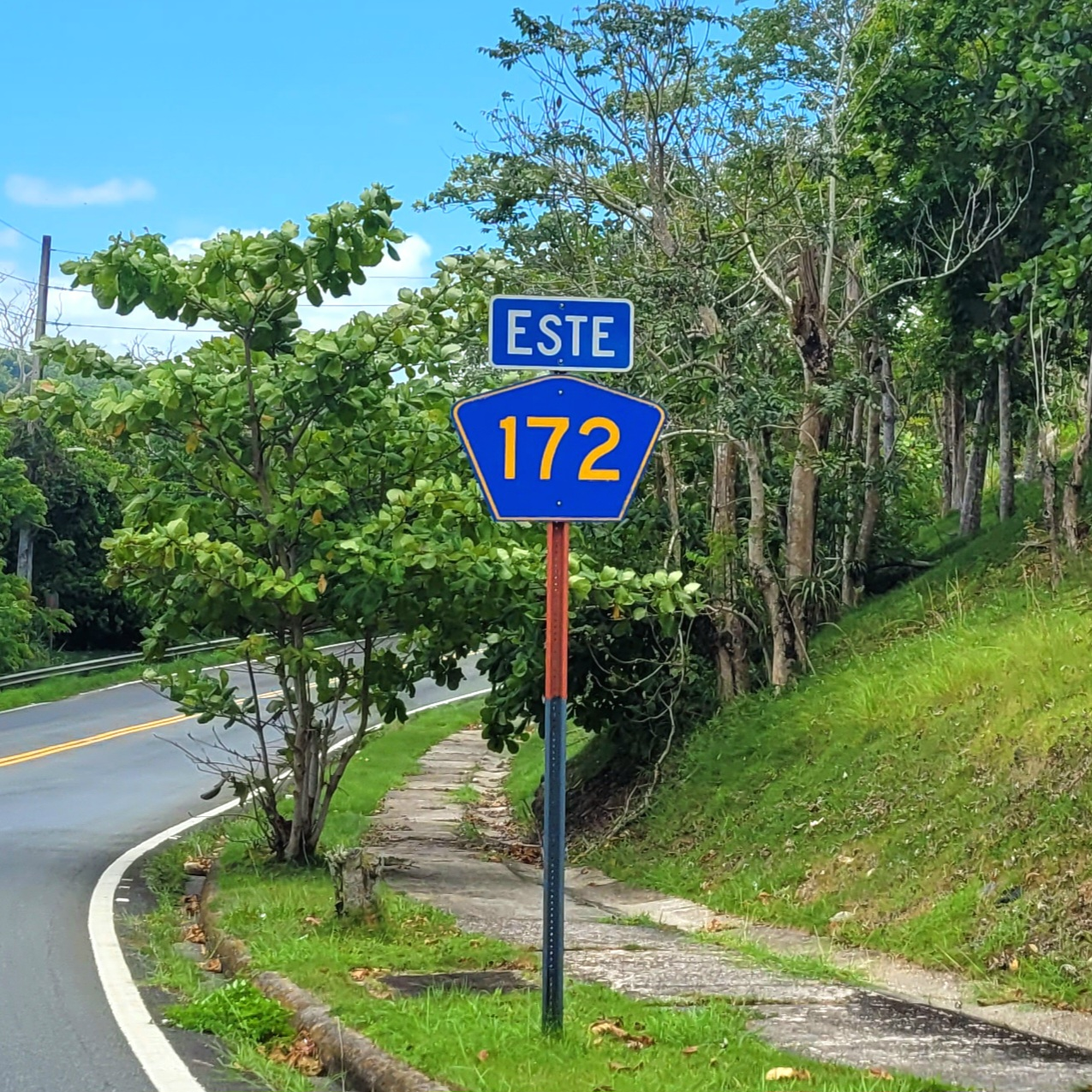
PR-172 east in Bayamón barrio

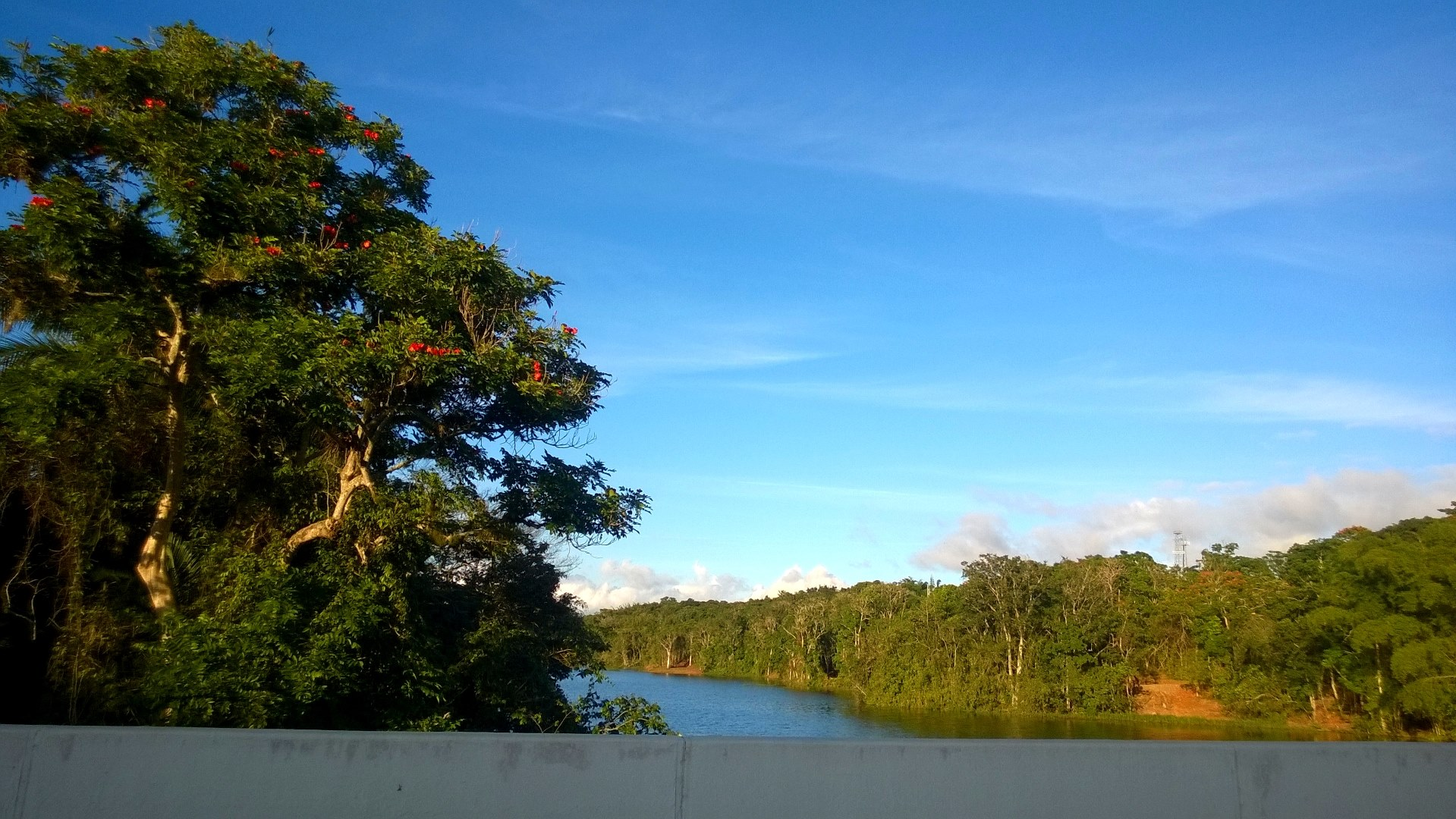
View of Lago de Cidra from PR-172 bridge

== Major intersections ==
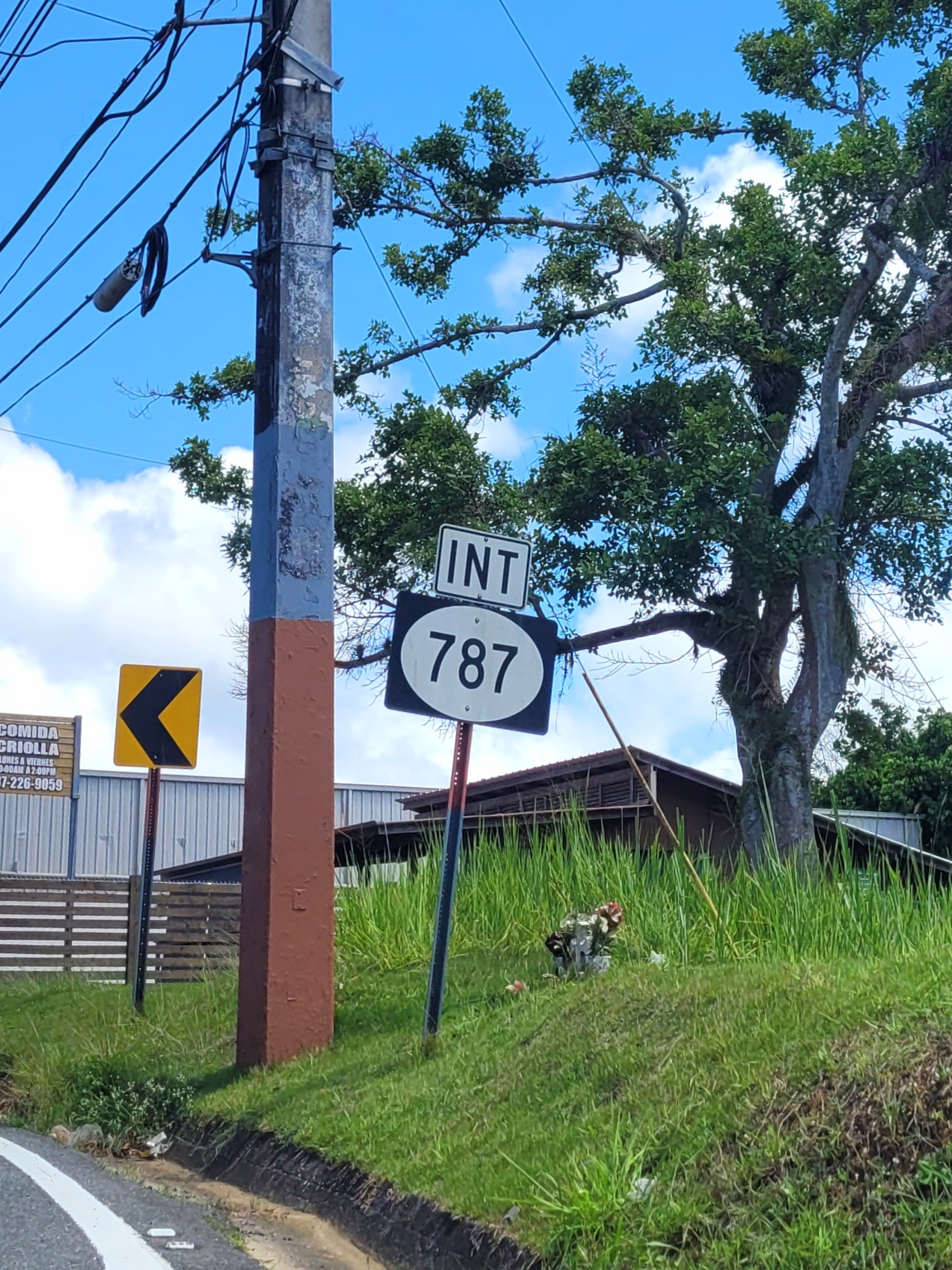
PR-172 west approaching PR-787 intersection in Bayamón, Cidra

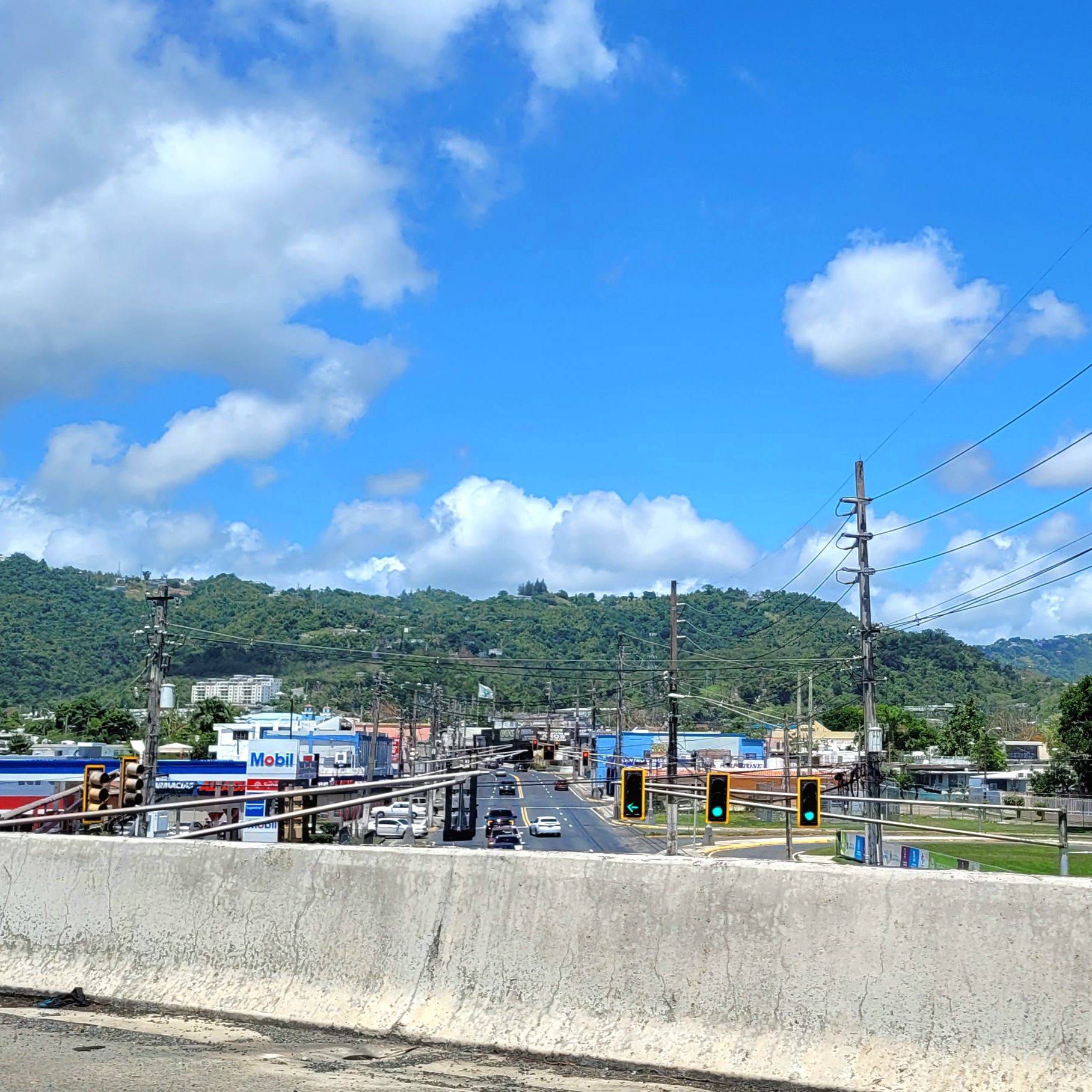
PR-172 west at PR-52 interchange between Turabo and Cañaboncito barrios in Caguas

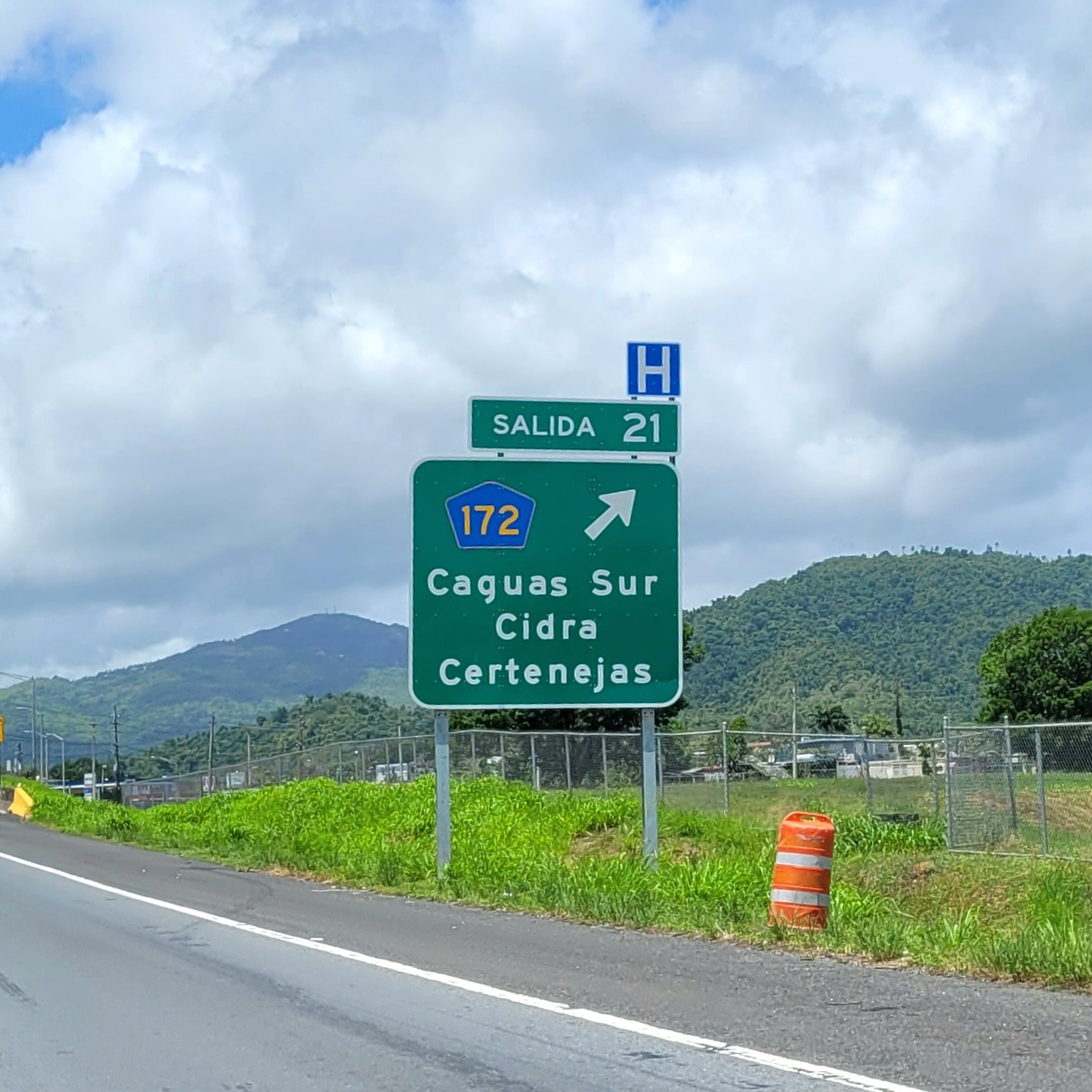
PR-52 south at exit 21 to PR-172 in Cañaboncito, Caguas

| Municipality | Location | km | mi | Destinations | Notes |
|---|---|---|---|---|---|
| Comerío | Naranjo | 0.0 | 0.0 | PR-156 – Comerío, Aguas Buenas | Western terminus of PR-172 |
| Comerío | Vega Redonda | 3.6– 3.7 | 2.2– 2.3 | PR-791 – Cejas | |
| Comerío | Vega Redonda | 5.4 | 3.4 | PR-7774 west – Comerío | |
| Cidra | Río Abajo | 9.4 | 5.8 | PR-7775 – Rabanal | |
| Cidra | Río Abajo–Ceiba– Rabanal tripoint | 11.5 | 7.1 | PR-7733 east (Avenida de la Eterna Primavera) – Aibonito, Cayey | |
| Cidra | Cidra barrio-pueblo | 12.2 | 7.6 | PR-173 south (Calle José Gautier Benítez) – Aibonito | Western terminus of PR-173 concurrency; one-way street |
| Cidra | Cidra barrio-pueblo | 12.3 | 7.6 | PR-173 north (Calle Román Baldorioty de Castro) – Aguas Buenas | Eastern terminus of PR-173 concurrency; one-way street; northbound access via Calle José Gautier Benítez or Calle Santiago R. Palmer |
| Cidra | Cidra barrio-pueblo | 12.4– 12.5 | 7.7– 7.8 | PR-171 (Calle Luis Muñoz Rivera) / PR-734 south (Calle José de Diego) – Cayey | One-way streets; PR-734 access via Calle Miguel Planellas or Calle Vicente Muñoz Barrios |
| Cidra | Bayamón–Arenas line | 13.6 | 8.5 | PR-7733 west (Avenida de la Eterna Primavera) – Cayey, Aibonito | |
| Cidra | Bayamón–Arenas line | 13.9 | 8.6 | PR-787 – Las Cruces | |
| Caguas | Cañaboncito | 20.9 | 13.0 | PR-785 – Hormigas | |
| Caguas | Cañaboncito | 22.2 | 13.8 | PR-784 – Cañaboncito | |
| Caguas | Turabo–Cañaboncito line | 26.4 | 16.4 | PR-7784 – Caguas | |
| Caguas | Turabo–Cañaboncito line | 27.5 | 17.1 | PR-52 (Autopista Luis A. Ferré) – San Juan, Ponce | PR-52 exit 21; diamond interchange |
| Caguas | Turabo–Cañaboncito line | 27.7 | 17.2 | PR-32 north (Avenida Luis Muñoz Marín) – Caguas | |
| Caguas | Caguas barrio-pueblo | 28.3 | 17.6 | PR-1 (Avenida José Gautier Benítez) – Caguas, Cayey | Eastern terminus of PR-172 |
1.000 mi = 1.609 km; 1.000 km = 0.621 mi: Concurrency terminus; Incomplete access

== See also ==
- 1953 Puerto Rico highway renumbering
