= Rincón, Cayey, Puerto Rico =

Barrio of Puerto Rico

Rincón
- Barrio
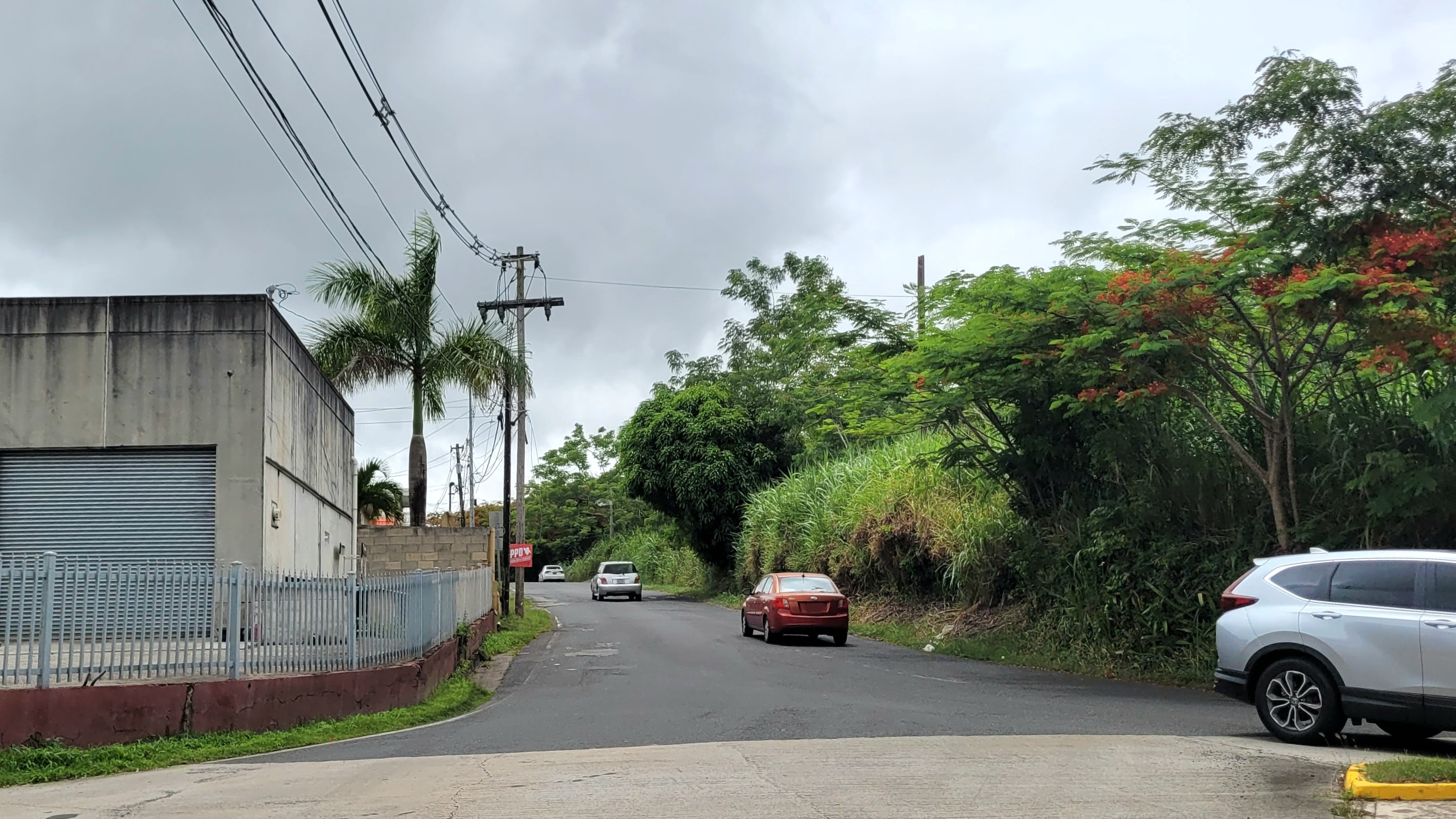
- Puerto Rico Highway 171 between Cayey barrio-pueblo and Rincón

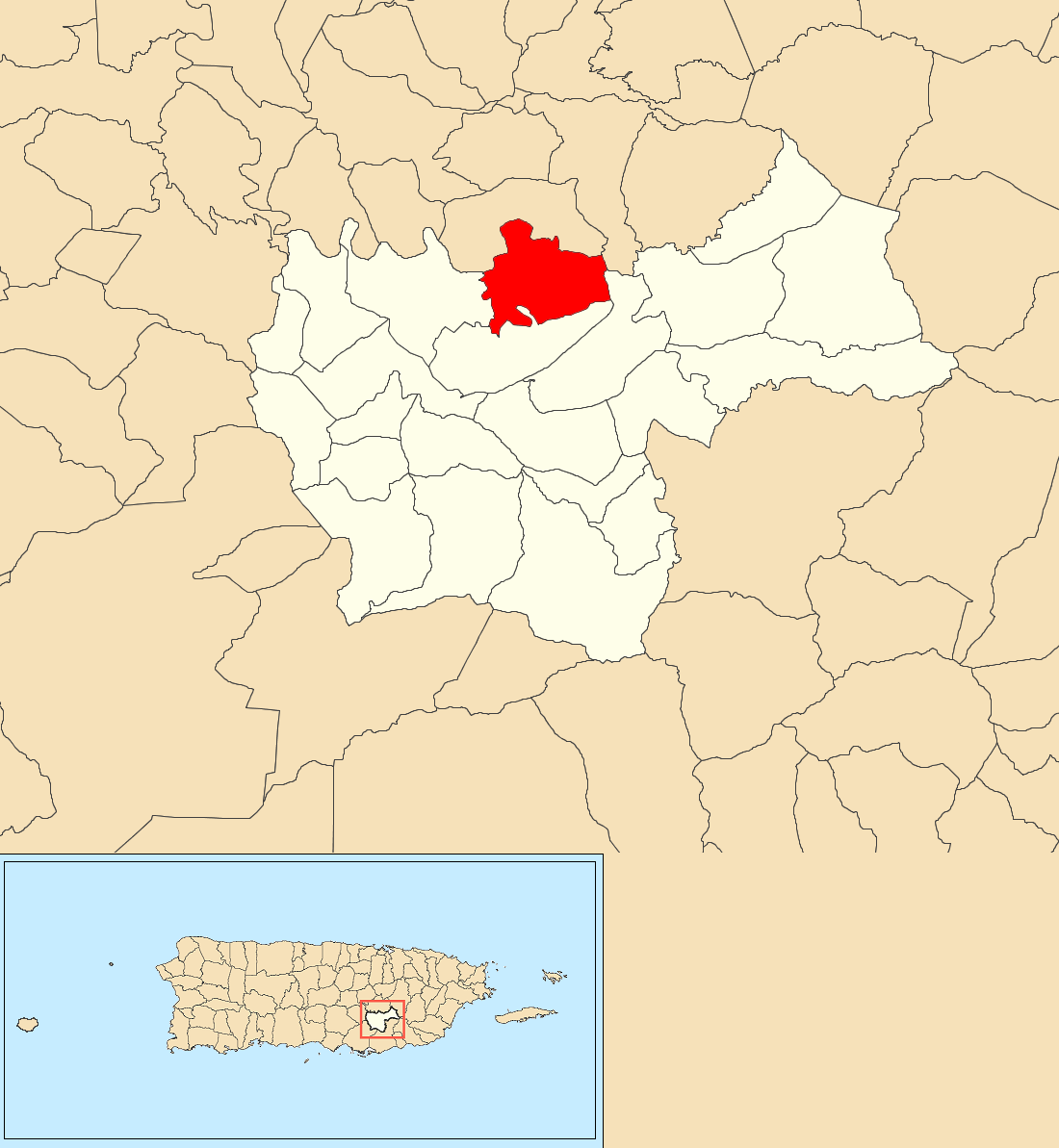
- Location of Rincón within the municipality of Cayey shown in red

- Location of Puerto Rico
- Coordinates: 18°07′30″N 66°09′16″W
- Commonwealth: Puerto Rico
- Municipality: Cayey

Area
  - Total: 2.38 sq mi (6.2 km^{2})
  - Land: 2.37 sq mi (6.1 km^{2})
  - Water: 0.01 sq mi (0.026 km^{2})
- Elevation: 1,283 ft (391 m)

Population (2010)
  - Total: 6,764
  - Density: 2,854/sq mi (1,102/km^{2})
- Source: 2010 Census
- Time zone: UTC−4 (AST)

Rincón is a barrio in the municipality of Cayey, Puerto Rico. Its population in 2010 was 6,764.

== History ==
Rincón was in Spain's gazetteers until Puerto Rico was ceded by Spain in the aftermath of the Spanish–American War under the terms of the Treaty of Paris of 1898 and became an unincorporated territory of the United States. In 1899, the United States Department of War conducted a census of Puerto Rico finding that the combined population of Rincón and Monte Llano barrios was 1,374.

Historical population
Census	Pop.	Note	%±
1910	925		—
1920	1,557		68.3%
1930	2,361		51.6%
1940	2,360		0.0%
1950	1,992		−15.6%
1960	1,791		−10.1%
1970	0		−100.0%
1980	2,336		—
1990	4,936		111.3%
2000	5,909		19.7%
2010	6,764		14.5%
U.S. Decennial Census; 1900 (N/A) 1910-1930; 1930-1950 1980-2000 2010

== See also ==
- List of communities in Puerto Rico
