= Monte Llano, Cayey, Puerto Rico =

Barrio of Puerto Rico

Monte Llano
- Barrio
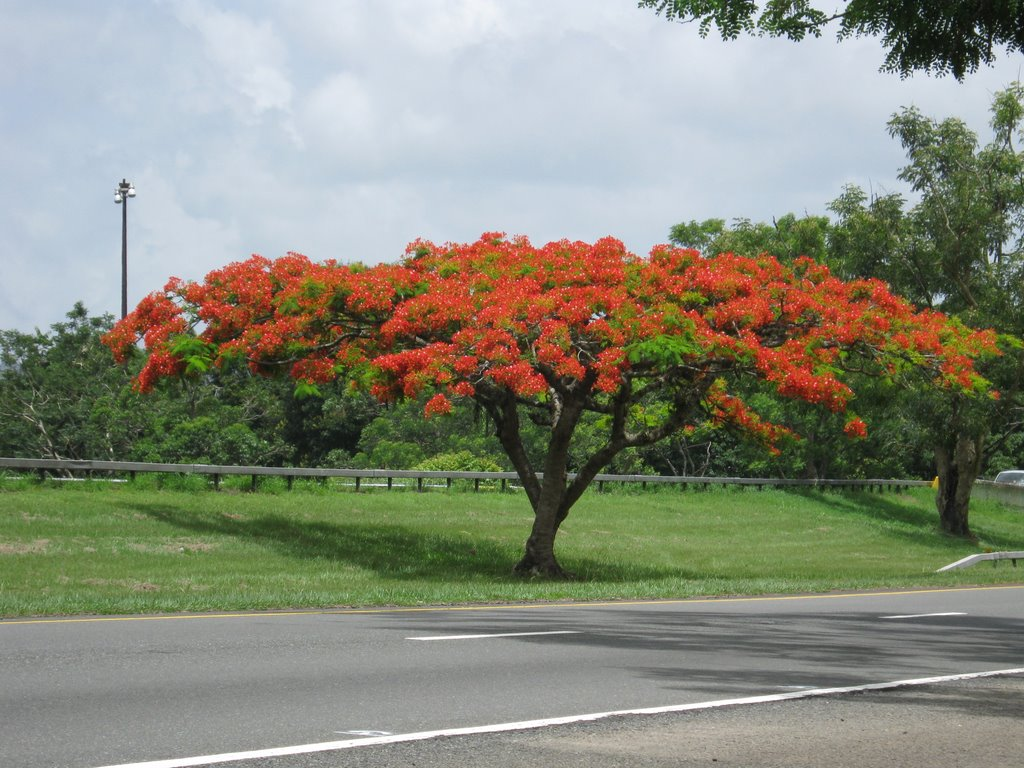
- Flamboyant on PR-52 in Monte Llano

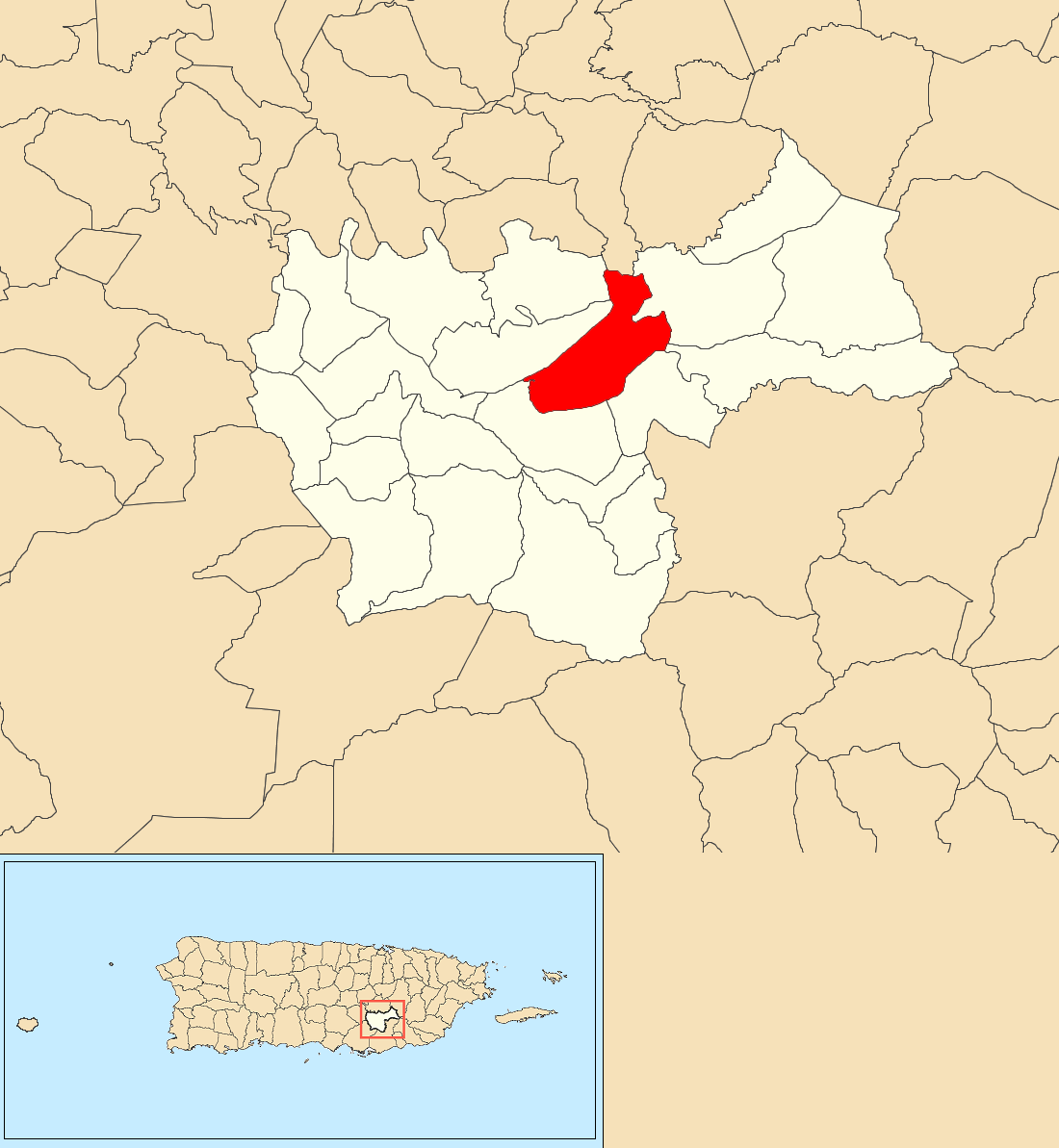
- Location of Monte Llano within the municipality of Cayey shown in red

- Location of Puerto Rico
- Coordinates: 18°06′50″N 66°08′21″W
- Commonwealth: Puerto Rico
- Municipality: Cayey

Area
  - Total: 2.6 sq mi (6.7 km^{2})
  - Land: 2.6 sq mi (6.7 km^{2})
  - Water: 0 sq mi (0 km^{2})
- Elevation: 1,312 ft (400 m)

Population (2010)
  - Total: 3,302
  - Density: 1,274.9/sq mi (492.2/km^{2})
- Source: 2010 Census
- Time zone: UTC−4 (AST)

Monte Llano is a barrio in the municipality of Cayey, Puerto Rico. Its population in 2010 was 3,302.

== History ==
Monte Llano was in Spain's gazetteers until Puerto Rico was ceded by Spain in the aftermath of the Spanish–American War under the terms of the Treaty of Paris of 1898 and became an unincorporated territory of the United States. In 1899, the United States Department of War conducted a census of Puerto Rico finding that the combined population of Monte Llano and Rincón barrios was 1,374.

Historical population
Census	Pop.	Note	%±
1910	1,397		—
1920	2,171		55.4%
1930	2,810		29.4%
1940	4,022		43.1%
1950	1,390		−65.4%
1960	1,160		−16.5%
1970	0		−100.0%
1980	2,597		—
1990	3,373		29.9%
2000	3,874		14.9%
2010	3,302		−14.8%
U.S. Decennial Census; 1900 (N/A) 1910-1930; 1930-1950 1980-2000 2010

== Gallery ==
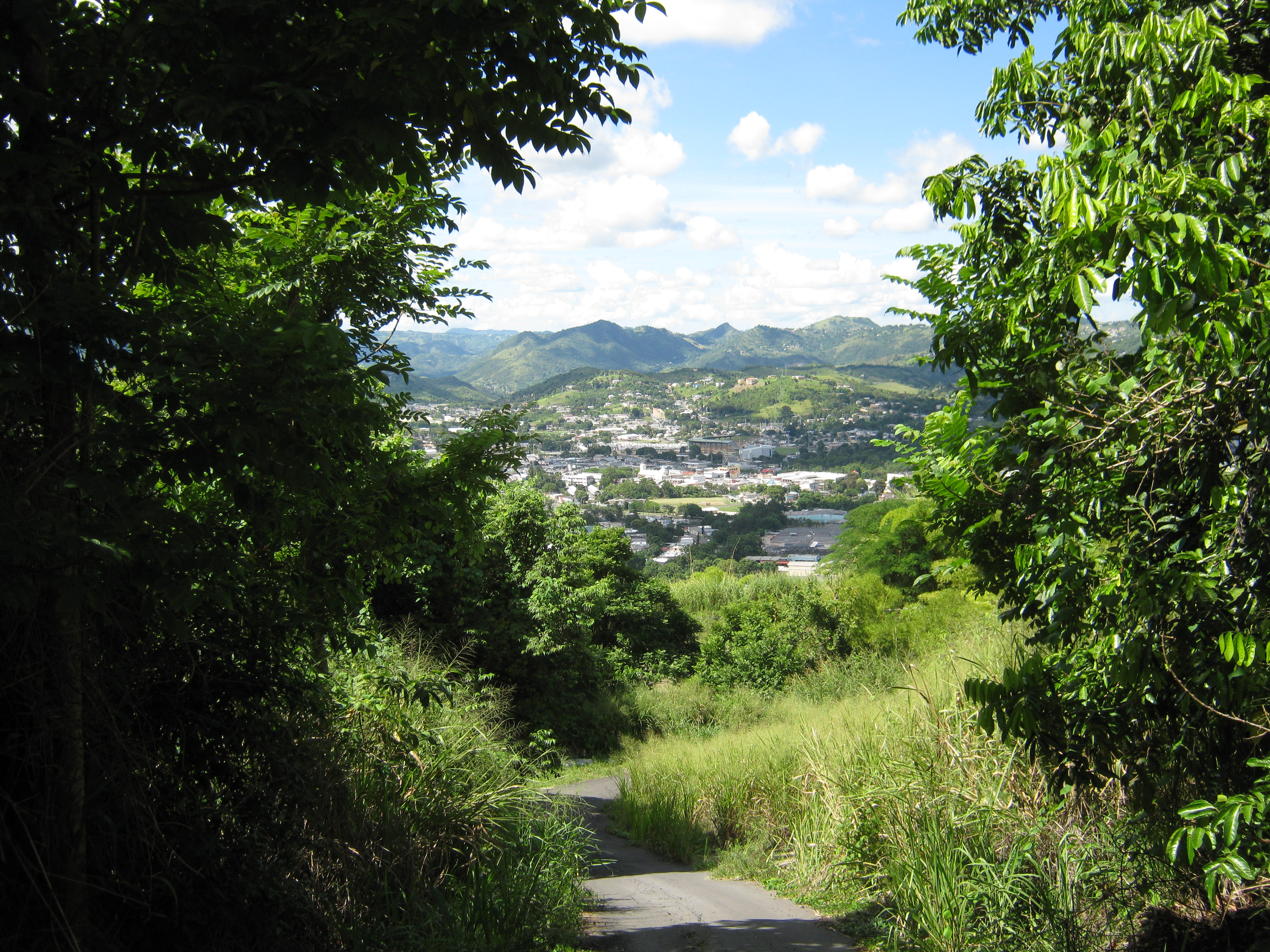
View of Cayey Pueblo from Monte Llano

== See also ==
- List of communities in Puerto Rico
