= Puerto Rico Highway 170 =

Highway in Puerto Rico

Highway 170
- Ruta 170
- Avenida Roberto Díaz

Route information
- Maintained by Puerto Rico DTPW
- Length: 2.3 km (1.4 mi)
- Existed: 1953–present

Major junctions
- South end: PR-206 in Matón Arriba
- North end: PR-14 / PR-731 in Cayey barrio-pueblo

Location
- Country: United States
- Territory: Puerto Rico
- Municipalities: Cayey

Highway system
- Roads in Puerto Rico; List
| ← PR-169 | → PR-171 |

Puerto Rico Highway 170 (PR-170) is a road located in Cayey, Puerto Rico. This highway begins at its intersection with PR-14 and PR-731 in downtown Cayey and ends at its junction with PR-1 and PR-206 in Matón Arriba.

== Major intersections ==
The entire route is located in Cayey.

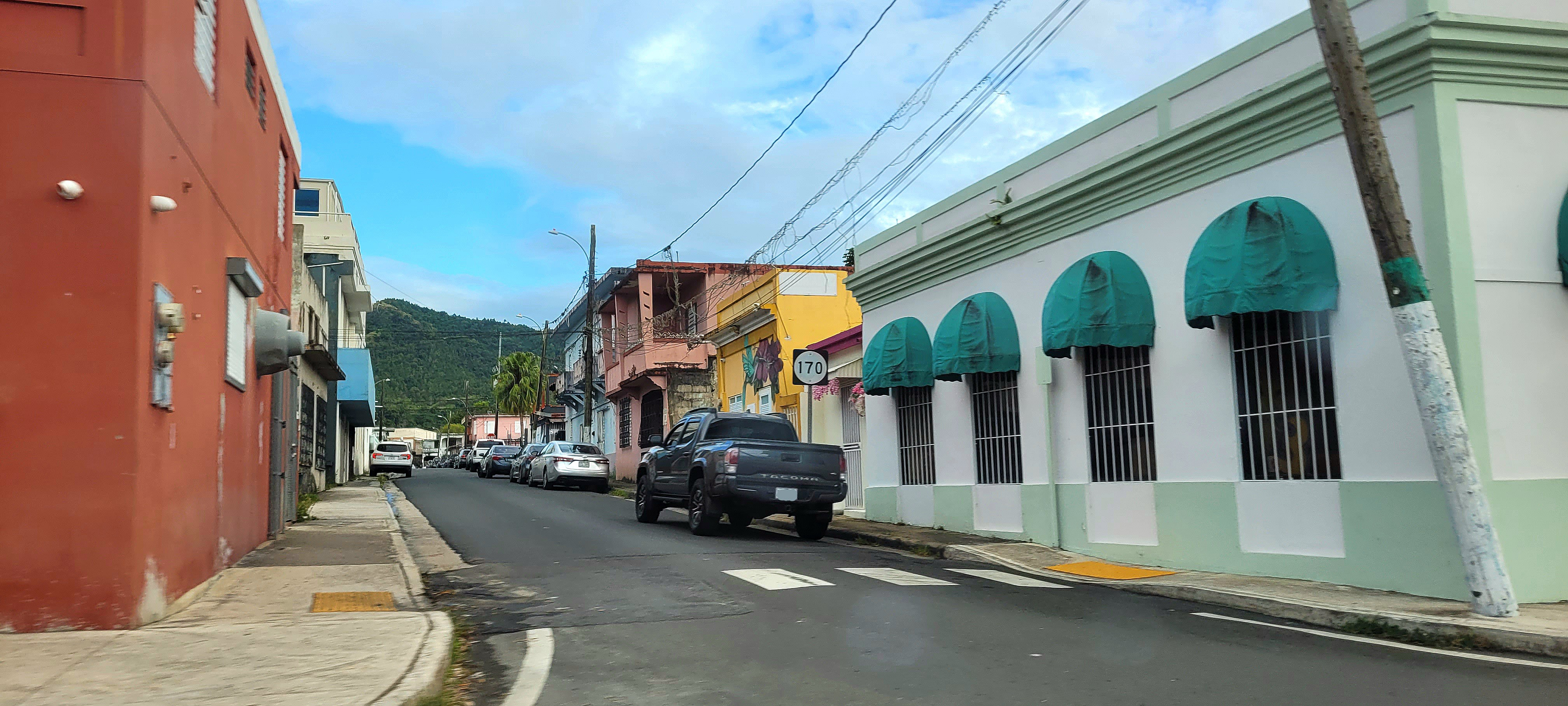
PR-170 in downtown Cayey, looking south

| Location | km | mi | Destinations | Notes |
|---|---|---|---|---|
| Matón Arriba | 0.0 | 0.0 | PR-206 to PR-1 – Cayey, Salinas | Southern terminus of PR-170 |
| Cayey barrio-pueblo | 2.1– 2.2 | 1.3– 1.4 | Avenida Miguel Meléndez Muñoz | Right turn only; no access across Avenida Miguel Meléndez Muñoz |
| Cayey barrio-pueblo | 2.3 | 1.4 | PR-14 / PR-731 (Calle Luis Muñoz Rivera) – Cayey, Aibonito | Northern terminus of PR-170 and southern terminus of PR-731; northbound access via Calle Lucía Vázquez and Calle Román Baldorioty de Castro |
1.000 mi = 1.609 km; 1.000 km = 0.621 mi: Incomplete access

== See also ==
- 1953 Puerto Rico highway renumbering
