= Puerto Rico Highway 206 =

Highway in Puerto Rico

Highway 206
- Ruta 206

Route information
- Maintained by Puerto Rico DTPW
- Length: 1.8 km (1.1 mi)

Major junctions
- South end: PR-1 in Matón Arriba
- PR-170 in Matón Arriba
- North end: PR-14 in Cayey barrio-pueblo

Location
- Country: United States
- Territory: Puerto Rico
- Municipalities: Cayey

Highway system
- Roads in Puerto Rico; List
← PR-205	→ PR-208

Puerto Rico Highway 206 (PR-206) is a connector in Cayey, Puerto Rico that bypasses the downtown area of Cayey, making easier for drivers who do not want to access the congested area of the business center to directly go from Puerto Rico Highway 1 to Puerto Rico Highway 14 to Aibonito, Puerto Rico. Like Puerto Rico Highway 203 and future Puerto Rico Highway 204, PR-206 has two lanes per direction and is about 1.8 km long.

== Major intersections ==
The entire route is located in Cayey.

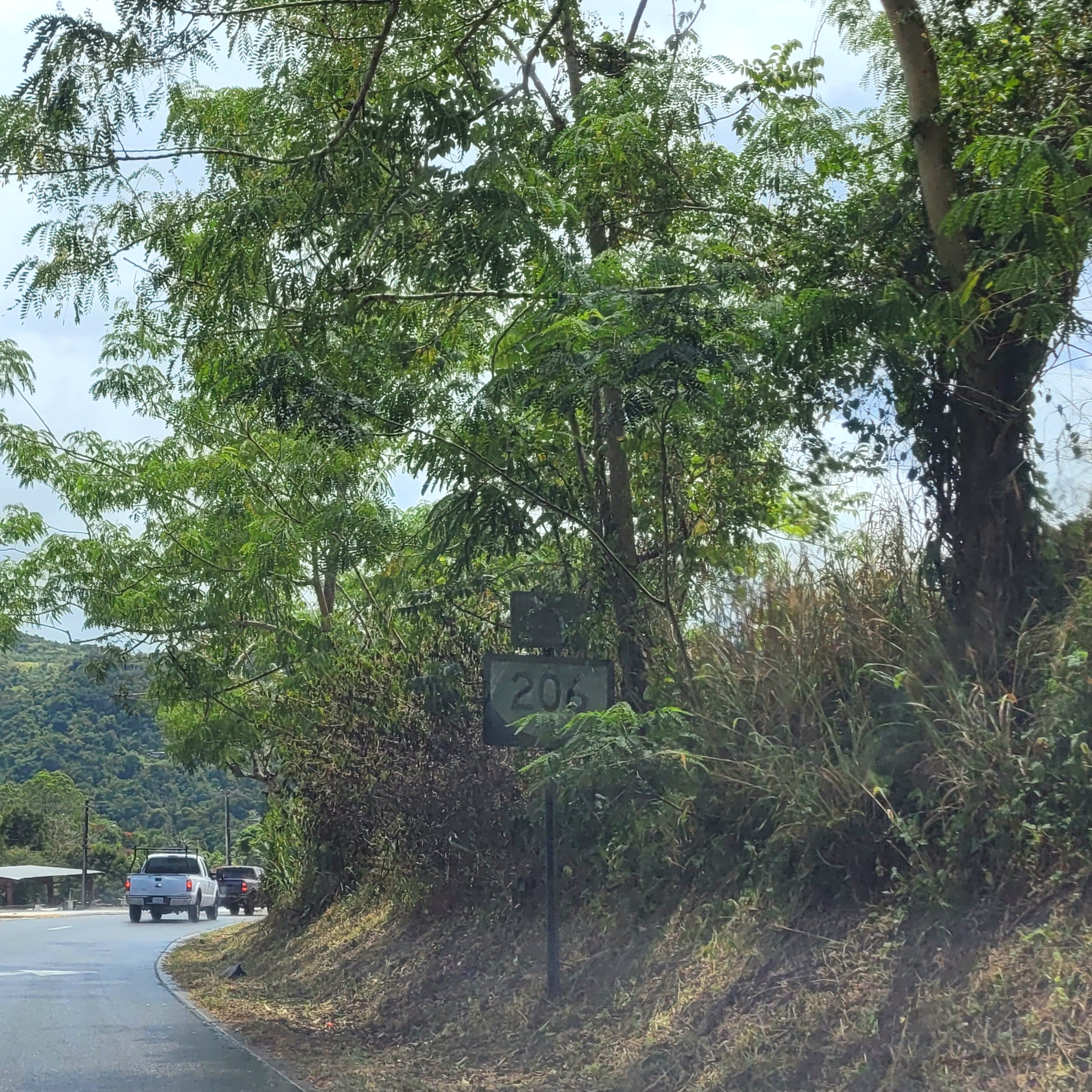
PR-1 south approaching PR-206 intersection in Matón Arriba

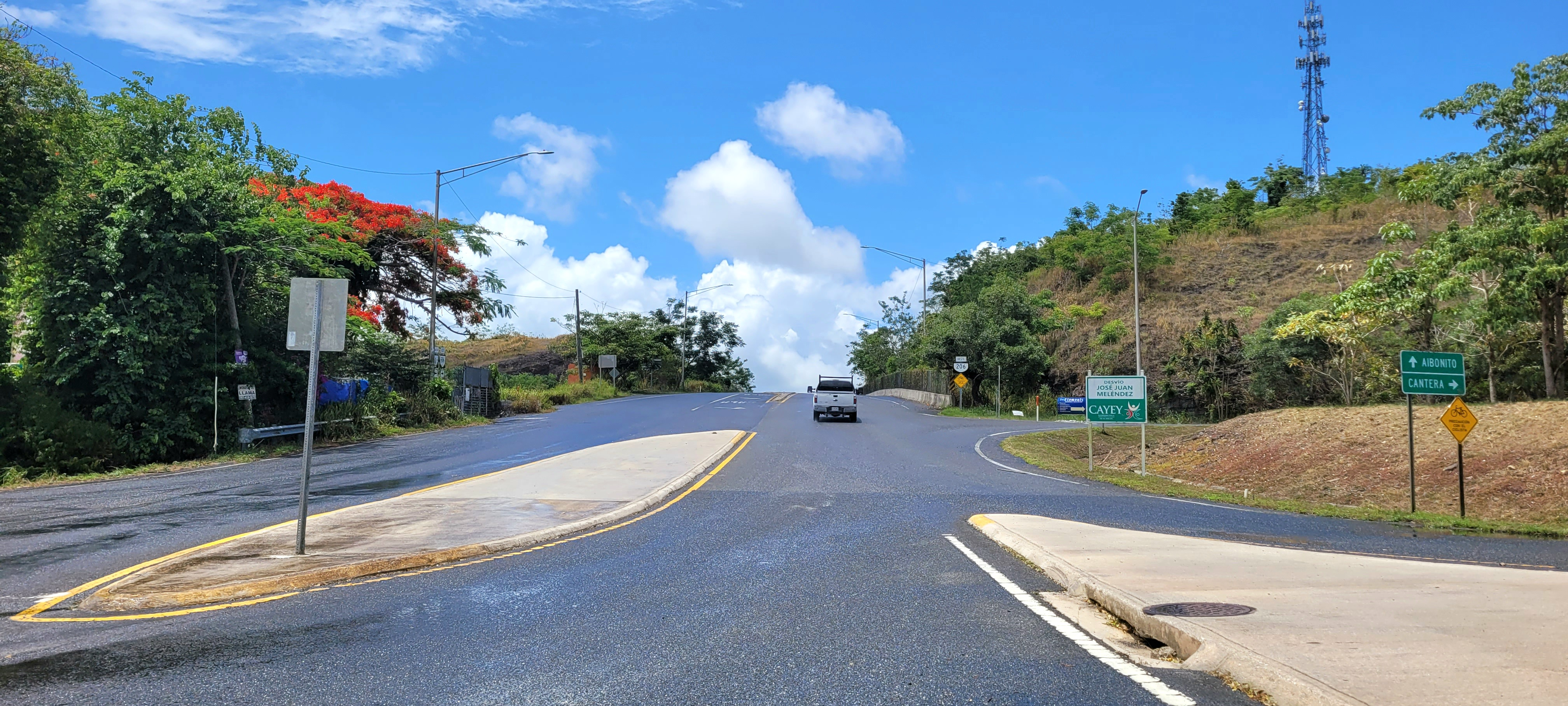
PR-206 north at PR-170 intersection in Matón Arriba

Location	km	mi	Destinations	Notes
Matón Arriba	0.0	0.0	PR-1	Seagull intersection; southern terminus of PR-206; access to Caguas and Salinas
Matón Arriba	0.0– 0.1	0.0– 0.062	PR-170 – Cantera	Southern terminus of PR-170; access to Cayey Centro; unsigned
Cayey barrio-pueblo	1.8	1.1	PR-14	Northern terminus of PR-206; access to Cayey Centro and Aibonito
1.000 mi = 1.609 km; 1.000 km = 0.621 mi
