= Arroyata River =

River of Puerto Rico

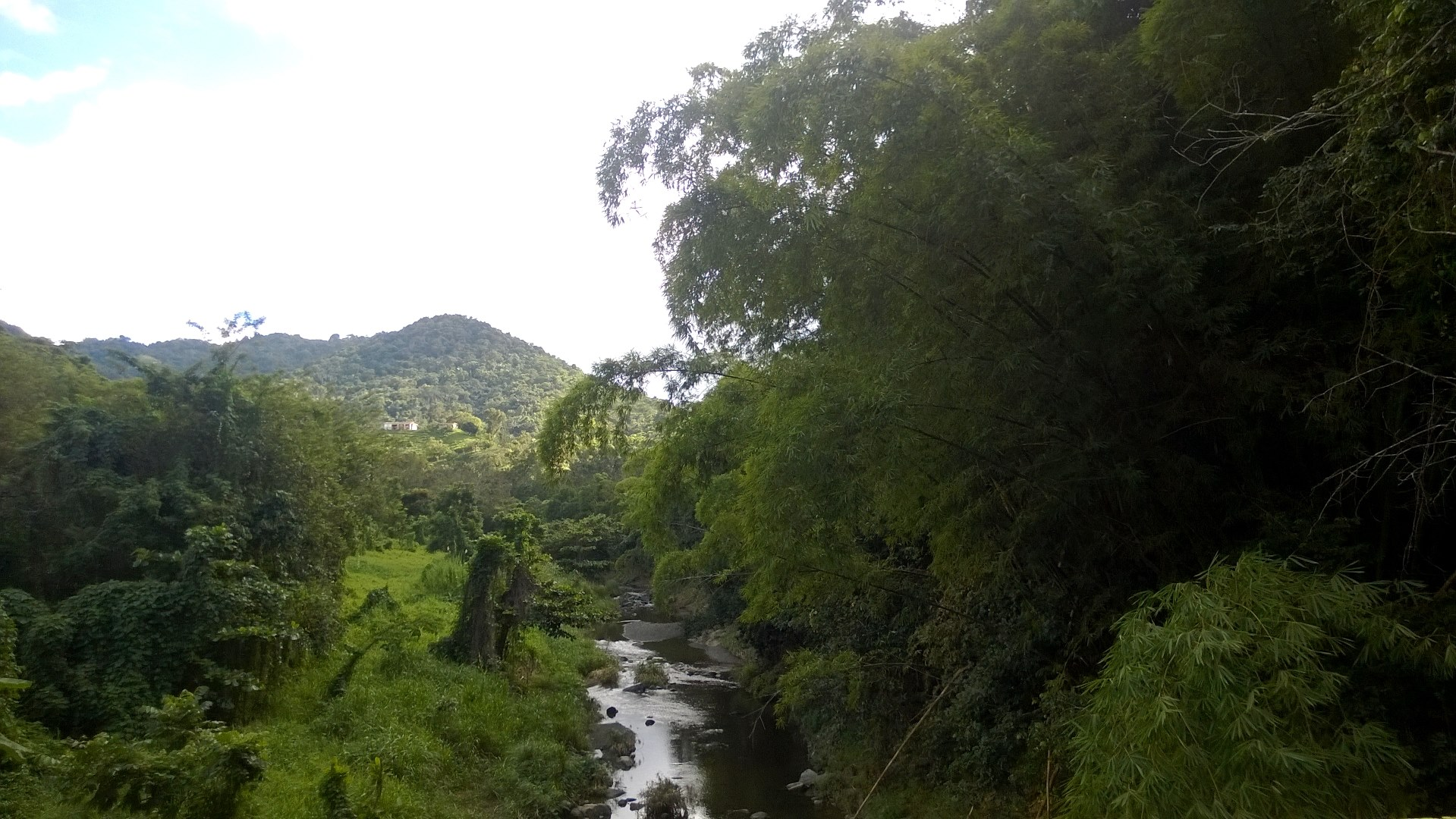
- Arroyata River in Vega Redonda barrio in Comerío
- Native name: Río Arroyata (Spanish)

Location
- Commonwealth: Puerto Rico
- Municipality: Cidra and Comerío

Physical characteristics
- Source
  - location: Sud, Cidra
- Mouth
  - location: La Plata River in Naranjo, Comerío
  - coordinates: 18.2394000°N 66.2087789°W

The Arroyata River (Spanish: Río Arroyata) is a tributary of La Plata River, located in the municipalities of Cidra and Comerío, Puerto Rico. The river has its source in the hills just south of Cidra Pueblo, in the Sud barrio of that municipality, and flows northwestwardly through Comerío, where it meets La Plata River at Naranjo barrio.

Portions of the Arroyata River have been designated an Important Bird Area by BirdLife International since 2007.

== See also ==
- List of rivers of Puerto Rico
