= Rincón, Cidra, Puerto Rico =

Barrio of Puerto Rico

Rincón
- Barrio
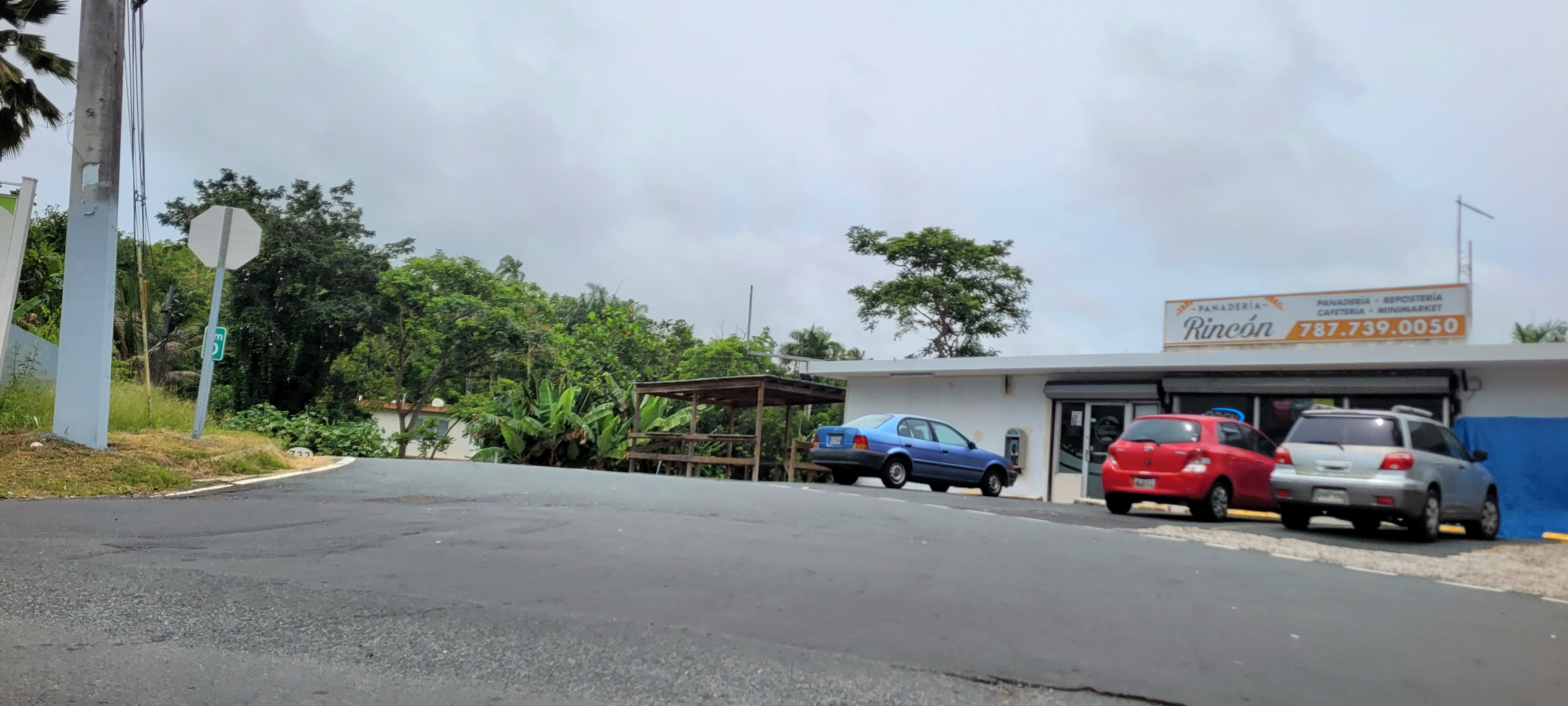
- Puerto Rico Highway 733 in Rincón

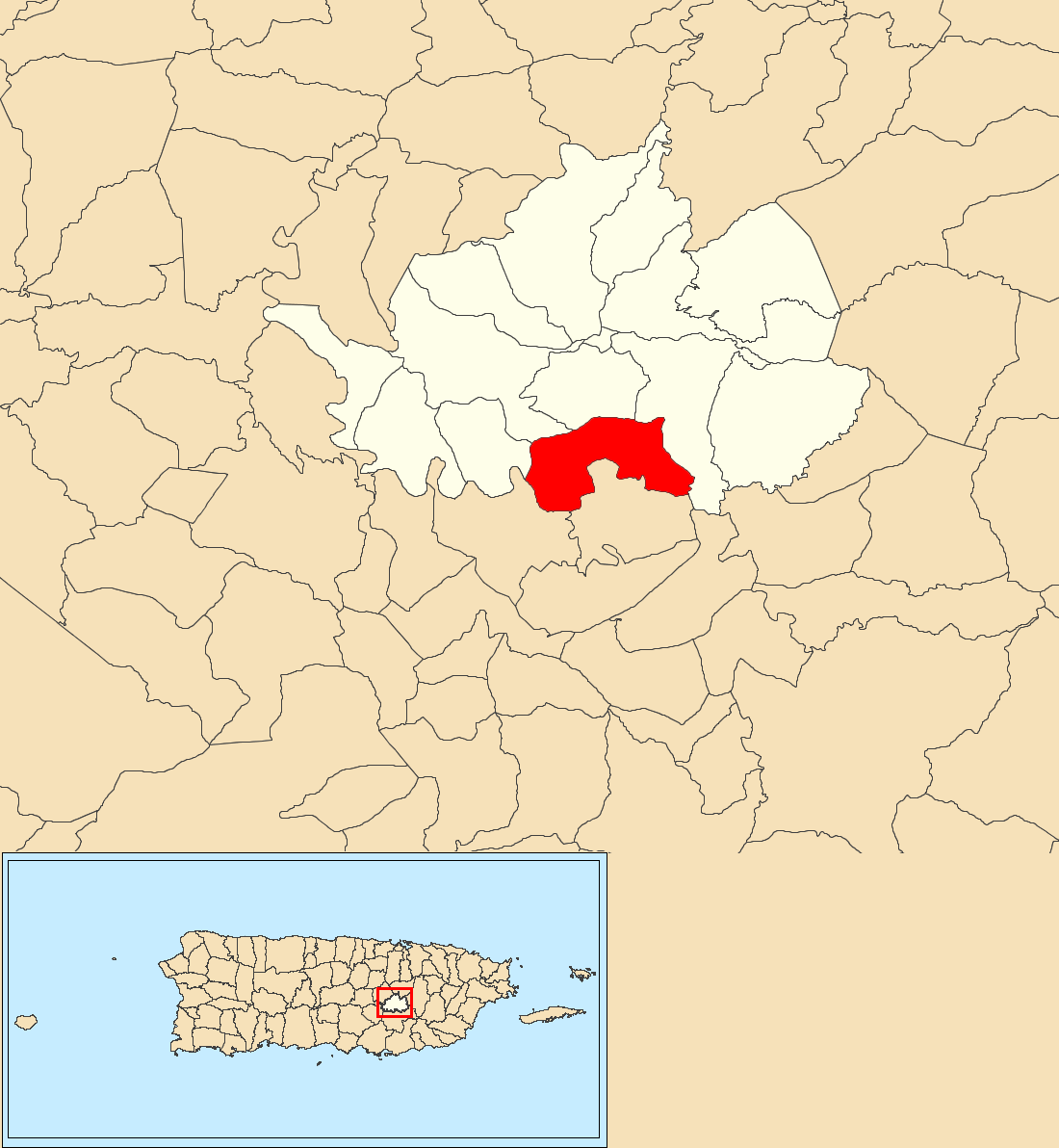
- Location of Rincón within the municipality of Cidra shown in red

- Location of Puerto Rico
- Coordinates: 18°08′58″N 66°09′44″W
- Commonwealth: Puerto Rico
- Municipality: Cidra

Area
  - Total: 2.55 sq mi (6.6 km^{2})
  - Land: 2.55 sq mi (6.6 km^{2})
  - Water: 0 sq mi (0 km^{2})
- Elevation: 1,430 ft (440 m)

Population (2010)
  - Total: 4,332
  - Density: 1,698.8/sq mi (655.9/km^{2})
- Source: 2010 Census
- Time zone: UTC−4 (AST)
- ZIP Code: 00739
- Area code: 787/939

Rincón is a barrio in the municipality of Cidra, Puerto Rico. Its population in 2010 was 4,332.

== History ==
Rincón was in Spain's gazetteers until Puerto Rico was ceded by Spain in the aftermath of the Spanish–American War under the terms of the Treaty of Paris of 1898 and became an unincorporated territory of the United States. In 1899, the United States Department of War conducted a census of Puerto Rico finding that the combined population of Rincón and Sur barrios was 901.

Historical population
Census	Pop.	Note	%±
1910	887		—
1920	910		2.6%
1930	1,287		41.4%
1940	1,377		7.0%
1950	1,237		−10.2%
1960	1,623		31.2%
1970	1,691		4.2%
1980	2,228		31.8%
1990	3,265		46.5%
2000	4,286		31.3%
2010	4,332		1.1%
U.S. Decennial Census; 1900 (N/A) 1910-1930; 1930-1950 1980-2000 2010

== Sectors ==
Barrios (which are, in contemporary times, roughly comparable to minor civil divisions) in turn are further subdivided into smaller local populated place areas/units called sectores (sectors in English). The types of sectores may vary, from normally sector to urbanización to reparto to barriada to residencial, among others.

The following sectors are in Rincón barrio:

Barriada I, Barriada II, Candelas, Chichón, Cotto, Entrada Capilla, García I, García II, La Herradura, La Línea, La Veguita, Los López, Nogueras, Rancho Díaz, Rafael Berríos, Torres, Villa Rosa, and Vitín La Torre.

== See also ==
- List of communities in Puerto Rico
- List of barrios and sectors of Cidra, Puerto Rico
