= Vega Redonda, Comerío, Puerto Rico =

Barrio of Puerto Rico

Vega Redonda
- Barrio
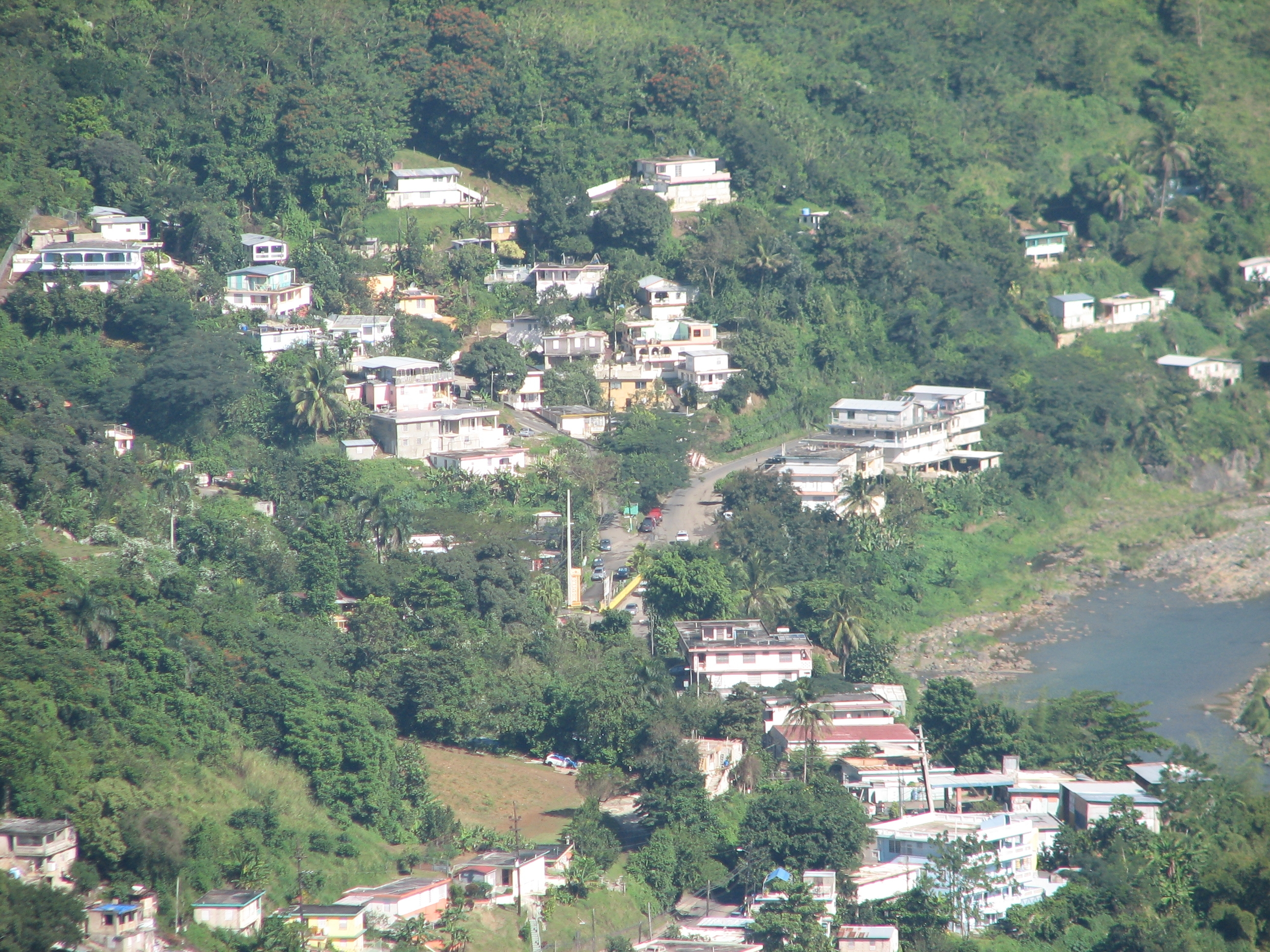
- View from Vega Redonda

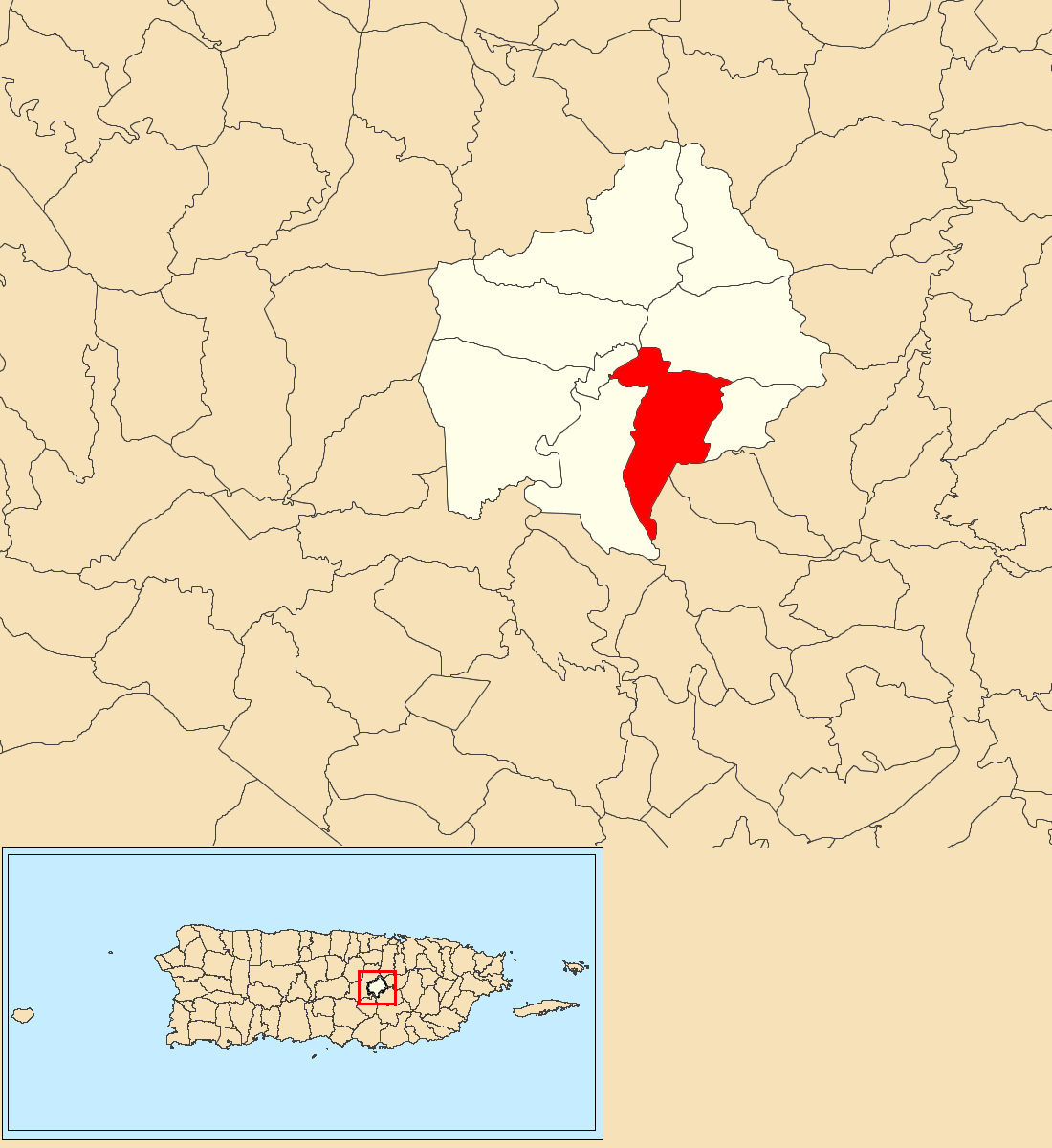
- Location of Vega Redonda within the municipality of Comerío shown in red

- Location of Puerto Rico
- Coordinates: 18°12′23″N 66°12′34″W
- Commonwealth: Puerto Rico
- Municipality: Comerío

Area
  - Total: 2.83 sq mi (7.3 km^{2})
  - Land: 2.83 sq mi (7.3 km^{2})
  - Water: 0 sq mi (0 km^{2})
- Elevation: 928 ft (283 m)

Population (2010)
  - Total: 1,197
  - Density: 423/sq mi (163/km^{2})
- Source: 2010 Census
- Time zone: UTC−4 (AST)
- ZIP Code: 00782
- Area code: 787/939

Vega Redonda is a barrio in the municipality of Comerío, Puerto Rico. Its population in 2010 was 1,197.

== Sectors and demographics ==
Barrios (which are roughly comparable to minor civil divisions) in turn are further subdivided into smaller local populated place areas/units called sectores (sectors in English). The types of sectores may vary, from normally sector to urbanización to reparto to barriada to residencial, among others.

The following sectors are located in Vega Redonda:

Apartamentos Amelia, Apartamentos El Español, Carretera 791, Sector La Mora Arriba, Sector Las Polleras, Sector Los Reyes, Sector Quebrada Adentro, and Sector Sabana.

Historical population
Census	Pop.	Note	%±
1910	1,089		—
1920	1,380		26.7%
1930	1,322		−4.2%
1940	1,426		7.9%
1950	1,314		−7.9%
1960	1,250		−4.9%
1970	1,029		−17.7%
1980	545		−47.0%
1990	1,151		111.2%
2000	1,020		−11.4%
2010	1,197		17.4%
U.S. Decennial Census; 1900 (N/A) 1910-1930; 1930-1950 1980-2000 2010

== History ==
Vega Redonda was in Spain's gazetteers until Puerto Rico was ceded by Spain in the aftermath of the Spanish–American War under the terms of the Treaty of Paris of 1898 and became an unincorporated territory of the United States. In 1899, the United States Department of War conducted a census of Puerto Rico finding that the combined population of Vega and Piñas barrios was 1,373.

== Gallery ==
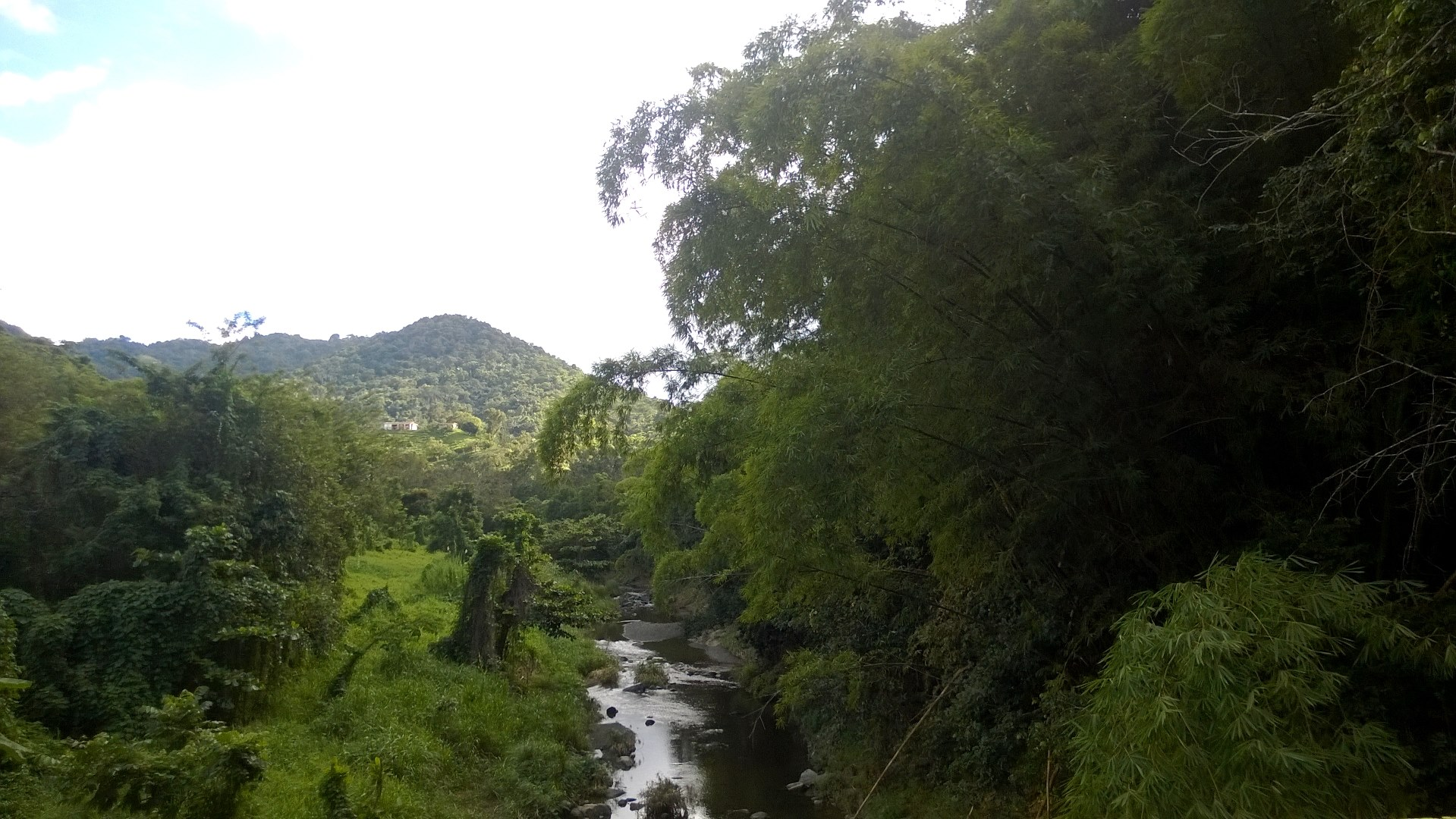
Arroyata River in Vega Redonda

== See also ==
- List of communities in Puerto Rico
