= Sud, Cidra, Puerto Rico =

Barrio of Puerto Rico

Sud Sur
- Barrio
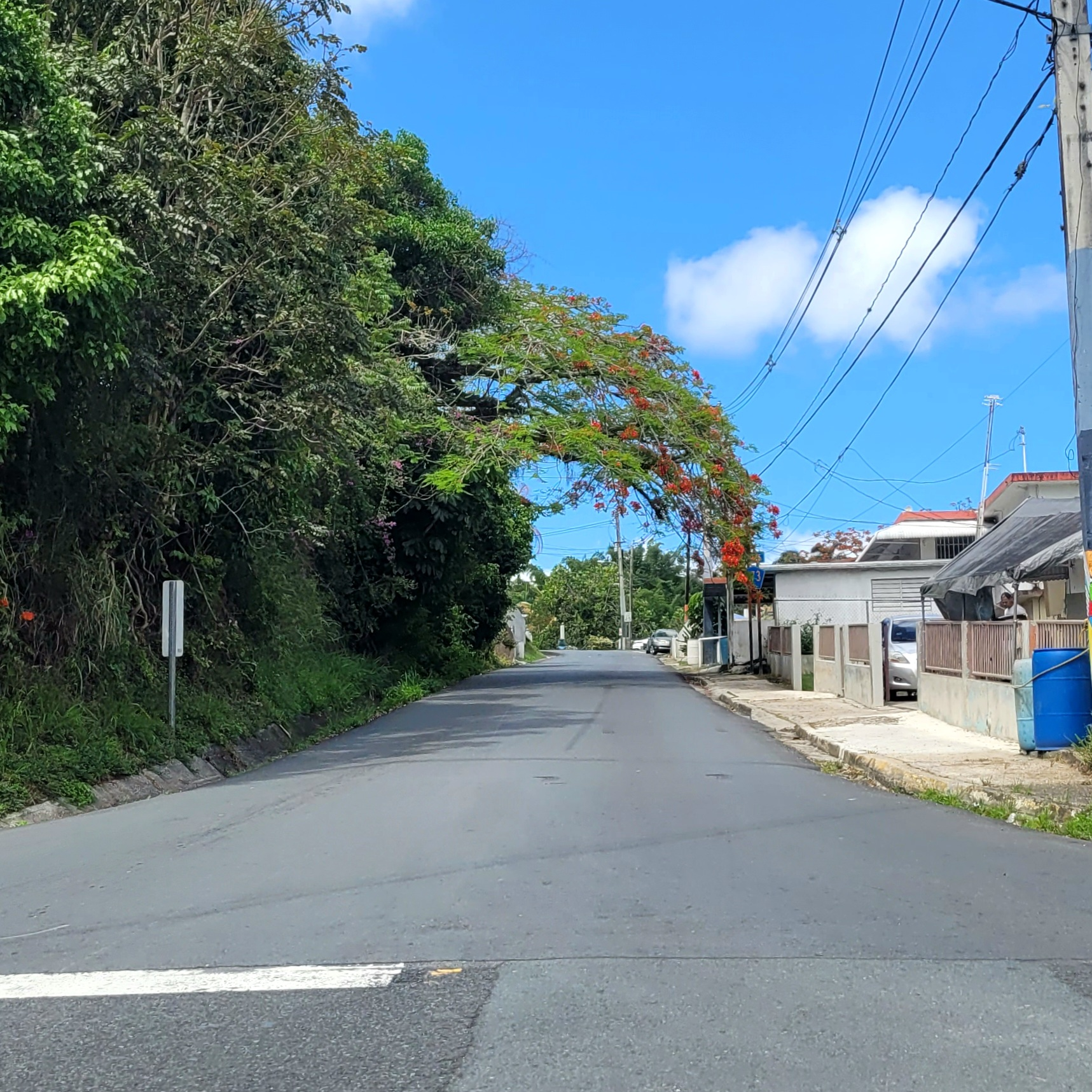
- Puerto Rico Highway 173 between Rabanal and Sud barrios

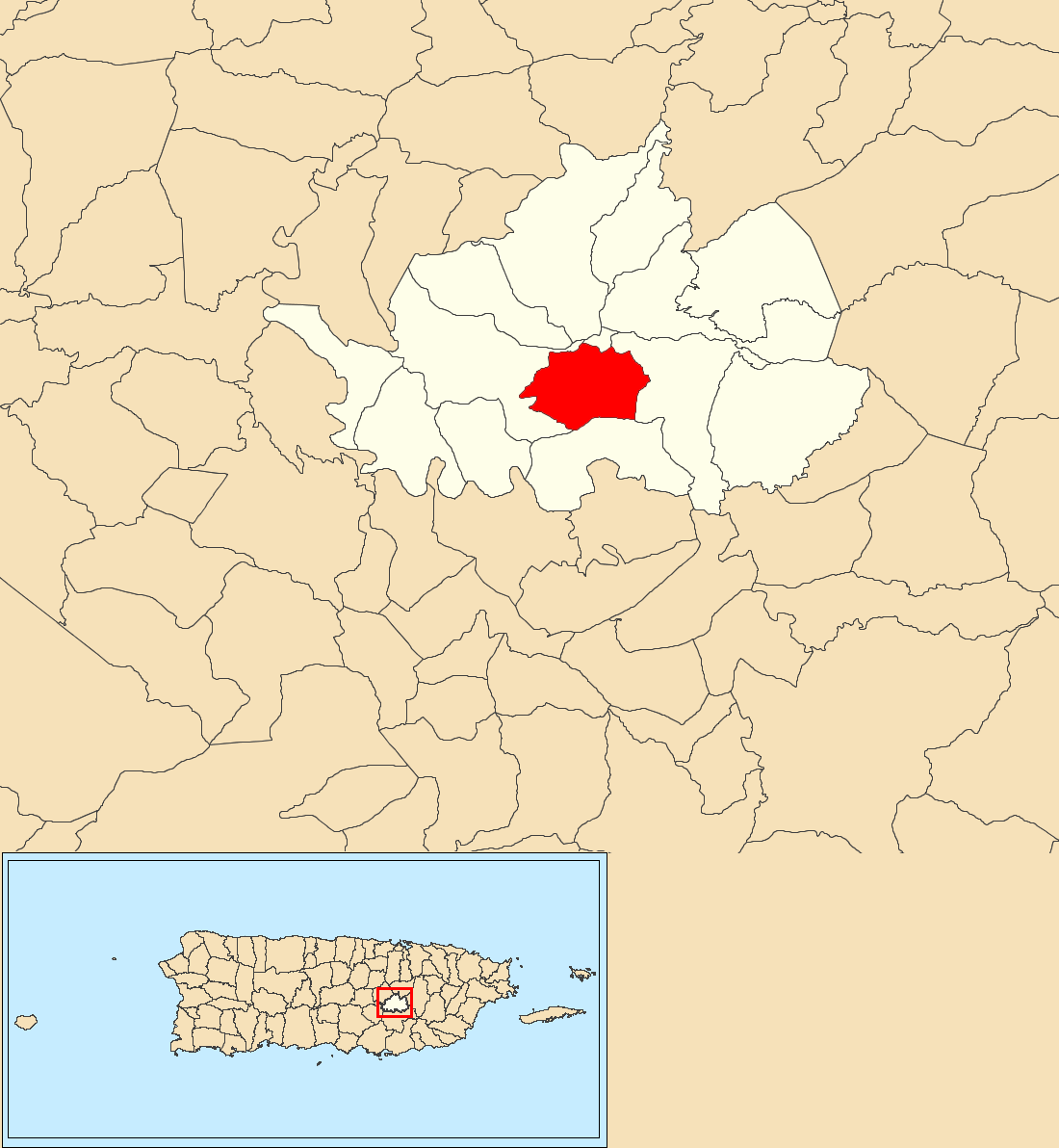
- Location of Sud within the municipality of Cidra shown in red

- Location of Puerto Rico
- Coordinates: 18°09′53″N 66°09′55″W
- Commonwealth: Puerto Rico
- Municipality: Cidra

Area
  - Total: 1.98 sq mi (5.1 km^{2})
  - Land: 1.98 sq mi (5.1 km^{2})
  - Water: 0 sq mi (0 km^{2})
- Elevation: 1,535 ft (468 m)

Population (2010)
  - Total: 3,714
  - Density: 1,875.8/sq mi (724.3/km^{2})
- Source: 2010 Census
- Time zone: UTC−4 (AST)
- ZIP Code: 00739
- Area code: 787/939

Sud is a barrio in the municipality of Cidra, Puerto Rico. Its population in 2010 was 3,714.

== History ==
Sud was in Spain's gazetteers until Puerto Rico was ceded by Spain in the aftermath of the Spanish–American War under the terms of the Treaty of Paris of 1898 and became an unincorporated territory of the United States. In 1899, the United States Department of War conducted a census of Puerto Rico finding that the combined population of Sud and Rincón barrios was 901.

Historical population
Census	Pop.	Note	%±
1910	542		—
1920	911		68.1%
1930	1,227		34.7%
1940	1,482		20.8%
1950	1,171		−21.0%
1960	1,055		−9.9%
1970	0		−100.0%
1980	3,085		—
1990	3,666		18.8%
2000	3,906		6.5%
2010	3,714		−4.9%
U.S. Decennial Census; 1900 (N/A) 1910-1930; 1930-1950 1980-2000 2010

== Sectors ==
Barrios (which are roughly comparable to minor civil divisions) in turn are further subdivided into smaller local populated place areas/units called sectores (sectors in English). The types of sectores may vary, from normally sector to urbanización to reparto to barriada to residencial, among others.

The following sectors are in Sud barrio:

Residencial Cidra Housing, Residencial Práxedes Santiago, Salida para Arenas, Sector Anaya, Sector Baltazar Rodríguez, Sector Casillas, Sector Collazo, Sector El Tamarindo, Sector Flores, Sector Franco, Sector Gallito, Sector González, Sector La Ceiba, Sector La Loma, Sector Los Hernández Arriba, Sector Montalván, Sector Palmasola, Sector Poldo Escribano, Sector Rodríguez, Sector Sud Arriba, Sector Tati Díaz (Sector Valle de Cidra), Sector Torres, Sector Vista Hermosa, Urbanización Colina del Paraíso, Urbanización Domingo Alejandro, Urbanización Ramos Antonini, Urbanización Valle Universitario, Urbanización y Extensión Villa del Carmen, Valles de Cidra, and Vistas de Cidra.

== See also ==
- List of communities in Puerto Rico
- List of barrios and sectors of Cidra, Puerto Rico
