= Cañaboncito, Caguas, Puerto Rico =

Barrio of Puerto Rico

Cañaboncito
- Barrio
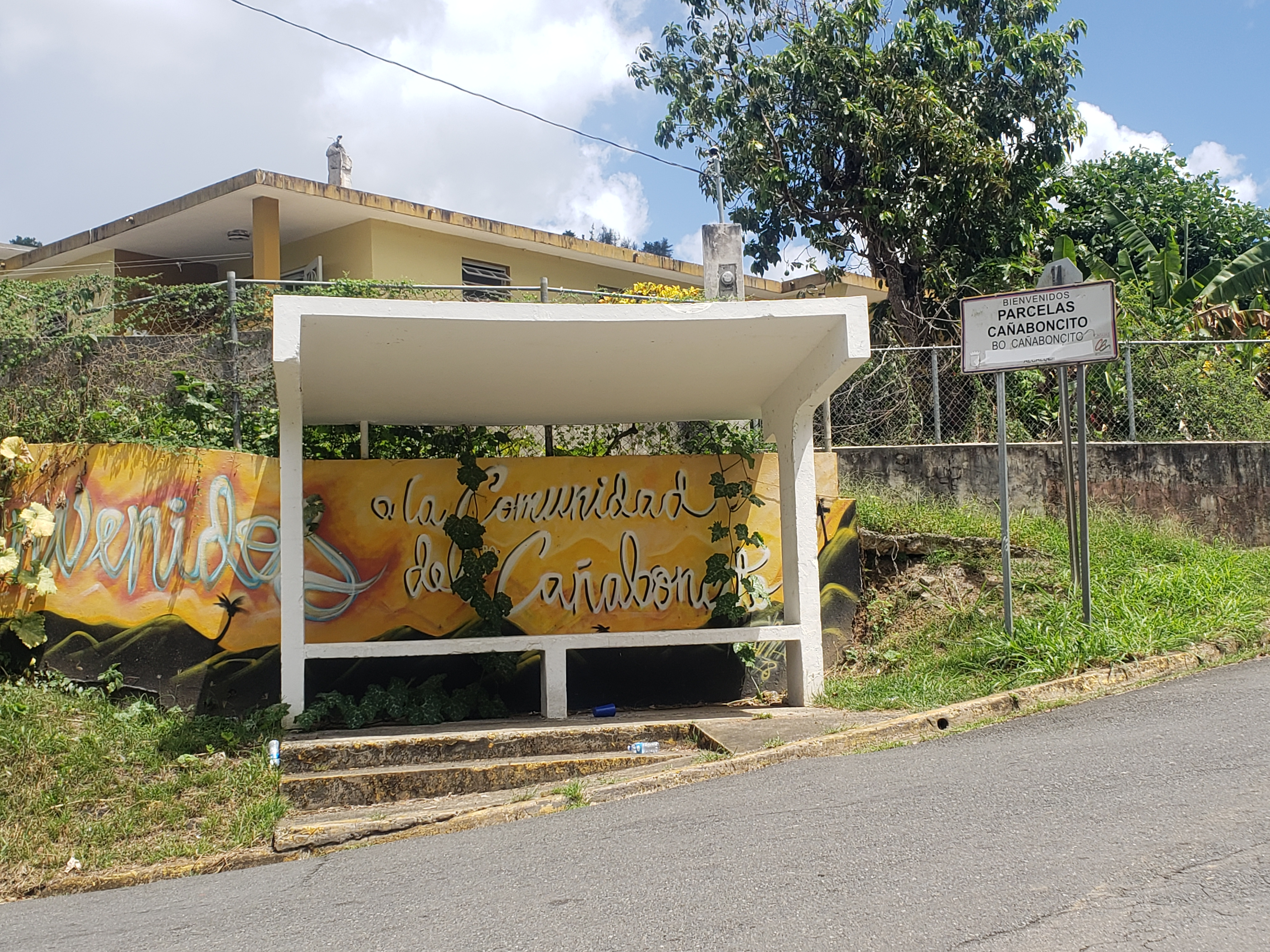
- Welcome sign at Parcelas Cañaboncito in Barrio Cañaboncito

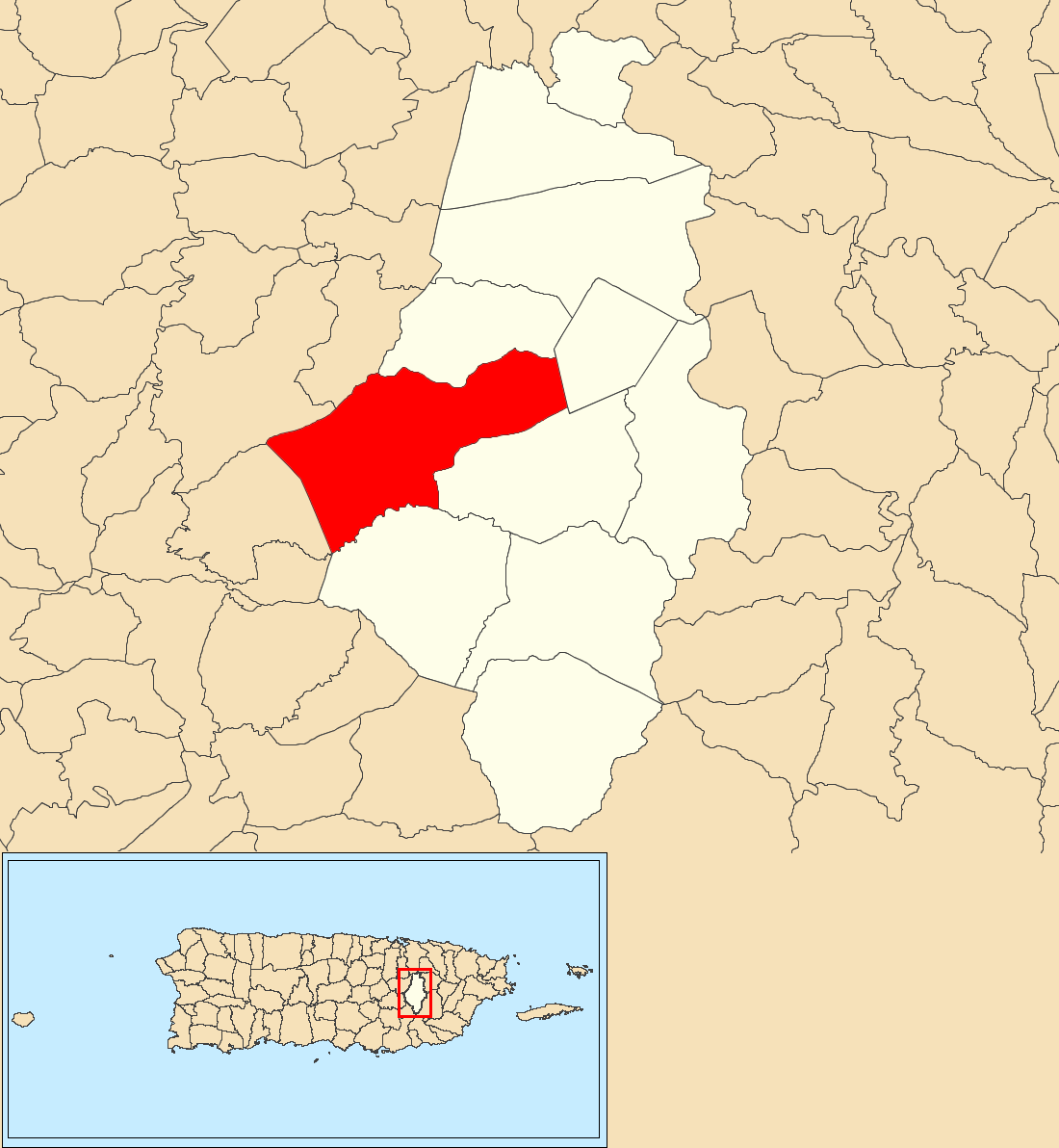
- Location of Cañaboncito within the municipality of Caguas shown in red

- Location of Puerto Rico
- Coordinates: 18°12′52″N 66°04′54″W
- Commonwealth: Puerto Rico
- Municipality: Caguas

Area
  - Total: 7.61 sq mi (19.7 km^{2})
  - Land: 7.61 sq mi (19.7 km^{2})
  - Water: 0 sq mi (0 km^{2})
- Elevation: 636 ft (194 m)

Population (2010)
  - Total: 27,464
  - Density: 3,608.9/sq mi (1,393.4/km^{2})
- Source: 2010 Census
- Time zone: UTC−4 (AST)
- ZIP code: 00725, 00726, 00727
- Area codes: 787, 939

Cañaboncito is a barrio in the municipality of Caguas, Puerto Rico. Its population in 2010 was 27,464. The barrio has over 90 sectors.

== History ==
Cañaboncito has 90 sectors.

Cañaboncito was in Spain's gazetteers until Puerto Rico was ceded by Spain in the aftermath of the Spanish–American War under the terms of the Treaty of Paris of 1898 and became an unincorporated territory of the United States. In 1899, the United States Department of War conducted a census of Puerto Rico finding that the population of Cañaboncito barrio was 1,400.

Historical population
| Census | Pop. | Note | %± |
|---|---|---|---|
| 1900 | 1,400 | | — |
| 1910 | 1,492 | | 6.6% |
| 1920 | 2,208 | | 48.0% |
| 1930 | 3,357 | | 52.0% |
| 1940 | 3,526 | | 5.0% |
| 1950 | 3,285 | | −6.8% |
| 1960 | 5,727 | | 74.3% |
| 1970 | 0 | | −100.0% |
| 1980 | 24,170 | | — |
| 1990 | 26,453 | | 9.4% |
| 2000 | 28,669 | | 8.4% |
| 2010 | 27,464 | | −4.2% |
U.S. Decennial Census; 1899 (shown as 1900) 1910-1930; 1930-1950 1980-2000 2010

== See also ==
- List of communities in Puerto Rico
