= Cayey barrio-pueblo =

Historical and administrative center (seat) of Cayey, Puerto Rico

Cayey barrio-pueblo Pueblo de Cayey
- Municipality Seat
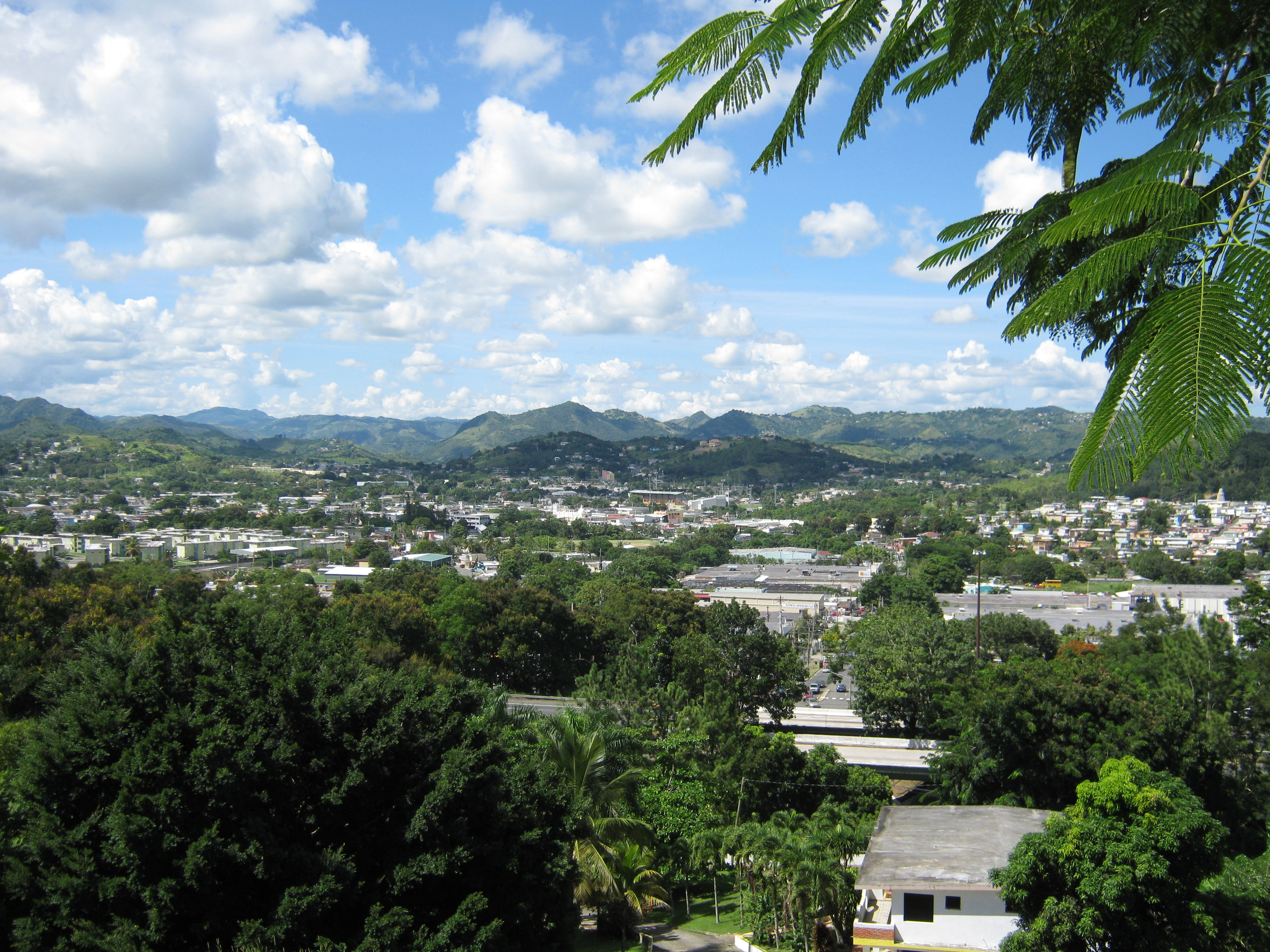
- Pueblo of Cayey from PR-15

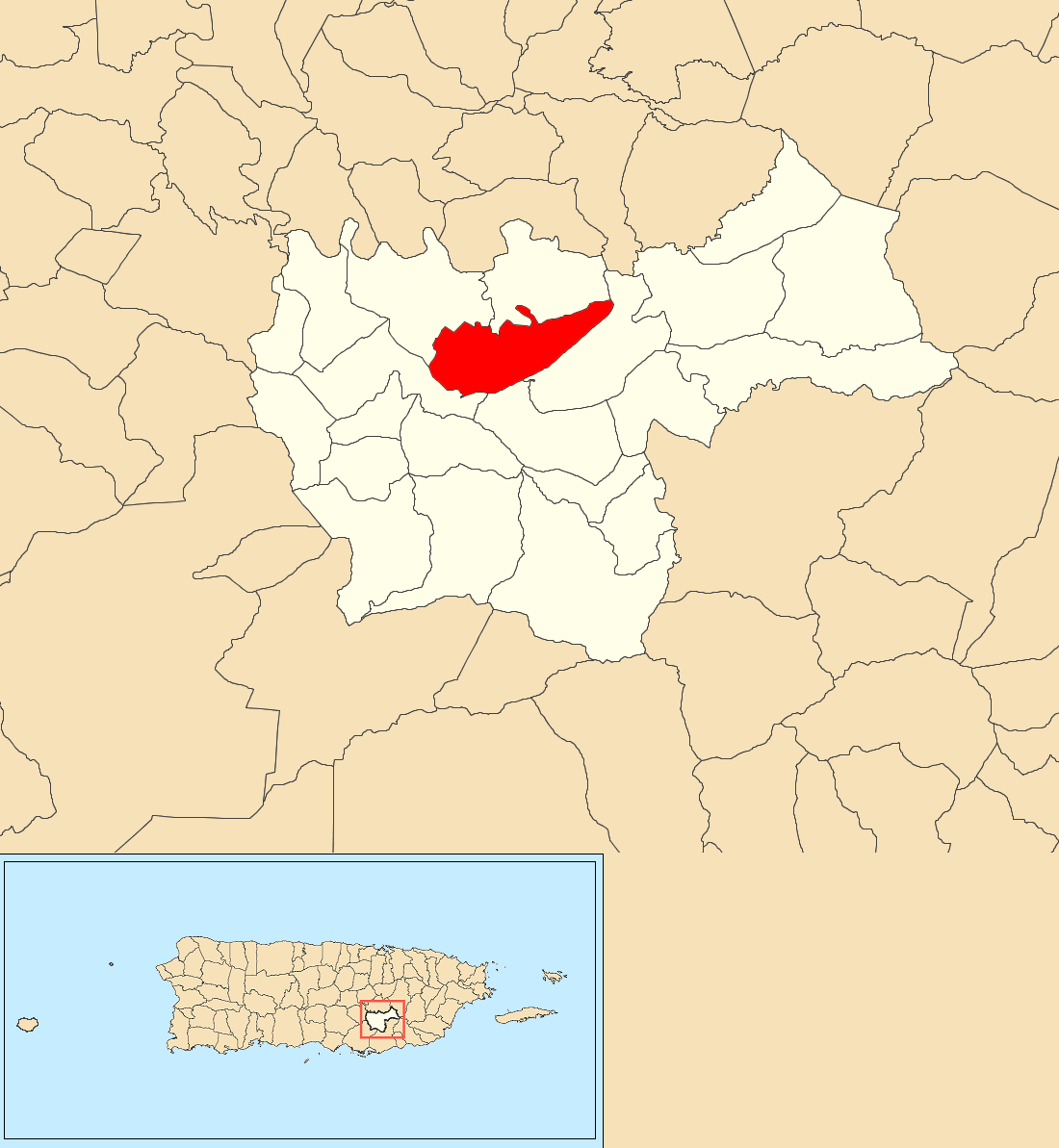
- Location of Cayey barrio-pueblo within the municipality of Cayey shown in red

- Location of Puerto Rico
- Coordinates: 18°06′53″N 66°09′44″W
- Commonwealth: Puerto Rico
- Municipality: Cayey

Area
  - Total: 2.45 sq mi (6.3 km^{2})
  - Land: 2.45 sq mi (6.3 km^{2})
  - Water: 0 sq mi (0 km^{2})
- Elevation: 1,319 ft (402 m)

Population (2010)
  - Total: 15,298
  - Density: 6,244.1/sq mi (2,410.9/km^{2})
- Source: 2010 Census
- Time zone: UTC−4 (AST)

Cayey barrio-pueblo is a barrio and the administrative center (seat) of Cayey, a municipality of Puerto Rico. Its population in 2010 was 15,298.

As was customary in Spain, in Puerto Rico, the municipality has a barrio called pueblo which contains a central plaza, the municipal buildings (city hall), and a Catholic church. Fiestas patronales (patron saint festivals) are held in the central plaza every year.

== The central plaza and its church ==
The central plaza, or square, is a place for official and unofficial recreational events and a place where people can gather and socialize from dusk to dawn. The Laws of the Indies, Spanish law, which regulated life in Puerto Rico in the early 19th century, stated the plaza's purpose was for "the parties" (celebrations, festivities) (Spanish: a propósito para las fiestas), and that the square should be proportionally large enough for the number of neighbors (Spanish: grandeza proporcionada al número de vecinos). These Spanish regulations also stated that the streets nearby should be comfortable portals for passersby, protecting them from the elements: sun and rain.

Located across the central plaza in Cayey barrio-pueblo is the Parroquia Nuestra Señora de la Asunción, a Roman Catholic church.

Cayey established an open-air museum at its public plaza in 2021.

== History ==
Cayey barrio-pueblo was in Spain's gazetteers until Puerto Rico was ceded by Spain in the aftermath of the Spanish–American War under the terms of the Treaty of Paris of 1898 and became an unincorporated territory of the United States. In 1899, the United States Department of War conducted a census of Puerto Rico finding that the population of Cayey Pueblo was 3,763.

Historical population
Census	Pop.	Note	%±
1900	3,763		—
1910	4,498		19.5%
1920	5,243		16.6%
1930	5,953		13.5%
1940	5,622		−5.6%
1950	18,429		227.8%
1960	19,738		7.1%
1970	0		−100.0%
1980	19,805		—
1990	18,951		−4.3%
2000	15,706		−17.1%
2010	15,298		−2.6%
U.S. Decennial Census; 1899 (shown as 1900) 1910-1930; 1930-1950 1980-2000 2010

== Gallery ==
Places in Cayey barrio-pueblo:

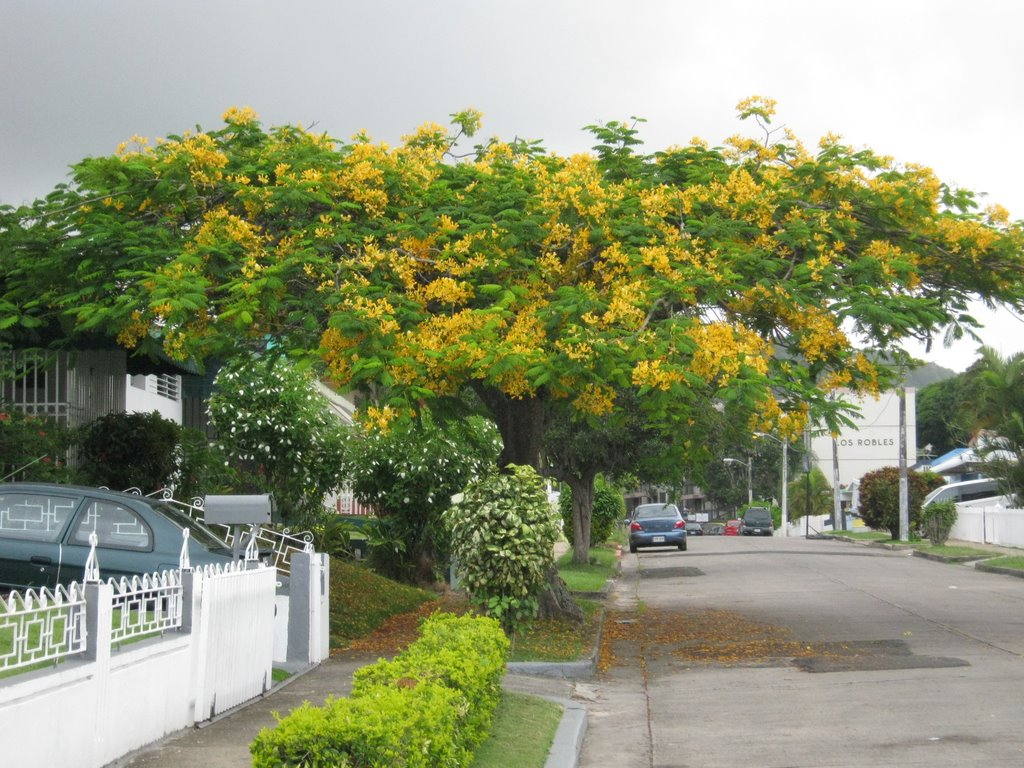
Yellow-flowering flamboyant on Calle Flamboyan

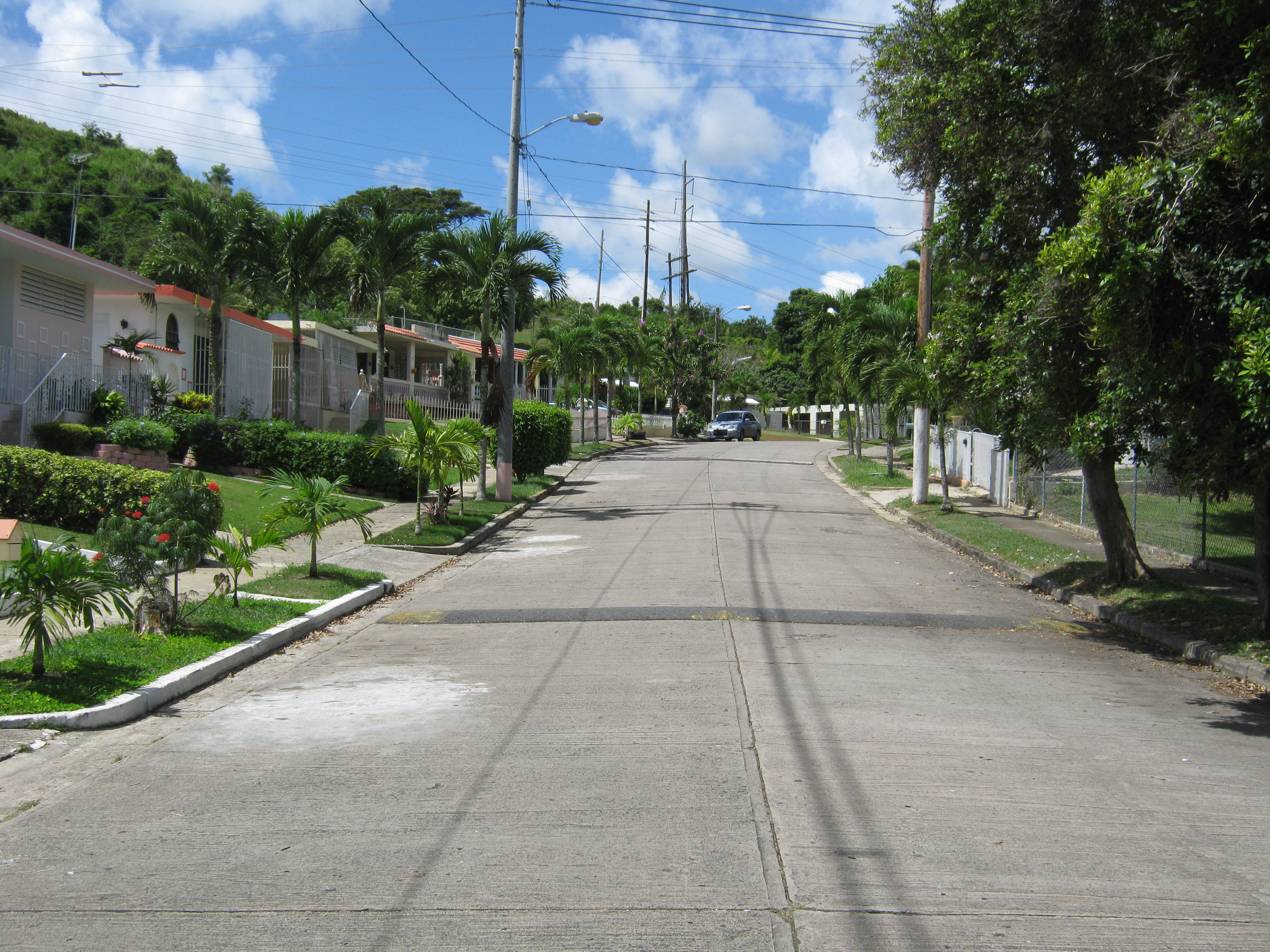
Calle Almendros in Urbanización Echevarria

== See also ==
- List of communities in Puerto Rico
