= Barrios of Puerto Rico =

Local level of territorial organization in Puerto Rico

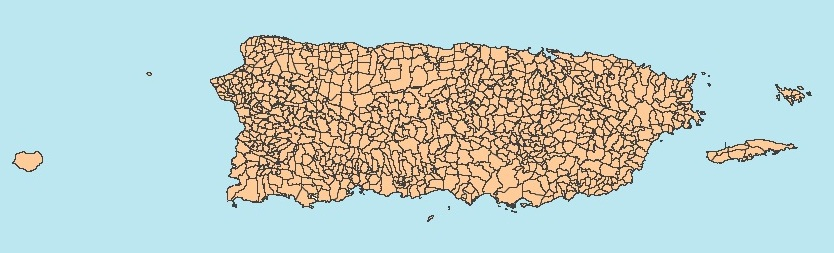
- Map of Puerto Rico by barrios
- Location: Commonwealth of Puerto Rico
- Number: 902
- Government: Under jurisdiction of municipal governments

The barrios of Puerto Rico are the third-level administrative divisions defined with geographic boundaries serving as the primary legal subdivisions of the 78 municipalities in the archipelago and island of Puerto Rico, an unincorporated territory of the U.S. Amounting to 902 wards or boroughs equivalent to minor civil divisions in the U.S., Such as cities, townships, and parishes, barrios are under the governmental authority of the popularly elected strong mayor and unicameral legislature governing the municipality within which they are located. Barrios are subdivided into numerous subbarrios, districts, communities, and/or sectors.

Except for San Juan, Ponce, Florida, and Vieques, all municipalities have a barrio equivalent to a downtown area in the U.S. called pueblo, officially known as barrio-pueblo (literally "neighborhood-town"), which typically is the site of the historic Spanish colonial settlement, administrative center, and urban core of the municipality. Of the 902 barrios proper, 828 are barrios and 74 barrios-pueblos.

== History ==
The history of the creation of the barrios of Puerto Rico can be traced to the 19th century, when historical documents first mention them. Historians have speculated that their creation may have been related to the Puerto Rican representation at the Cortes of Cádiz. The names of barrios in Puerto Rico come from various sources, mostly from Spanish or Indigenous origin. One barrio in each municipality (except for Florida, Ponce, and San Juan) is identified as the barrio-pueblo. It is differentiated from other barrios in that it is the historical center of the municipality and the area that represented the seat of the municipal government at the time Puerto Rico formalized the municipio and barrio boundaries in the late 1940s. From time to time barrios are created, broken up, or merged. The downtown district of each town was called pueblo until 1990, when they began to be referred to as barrio-pueblo in the US Census, and contains the plaza, municipal buildings and a Roman Catholic church.

In 1832 there were 490, in 1878 there were 841, in 1990 there were 899 barrios.

== Classification ==
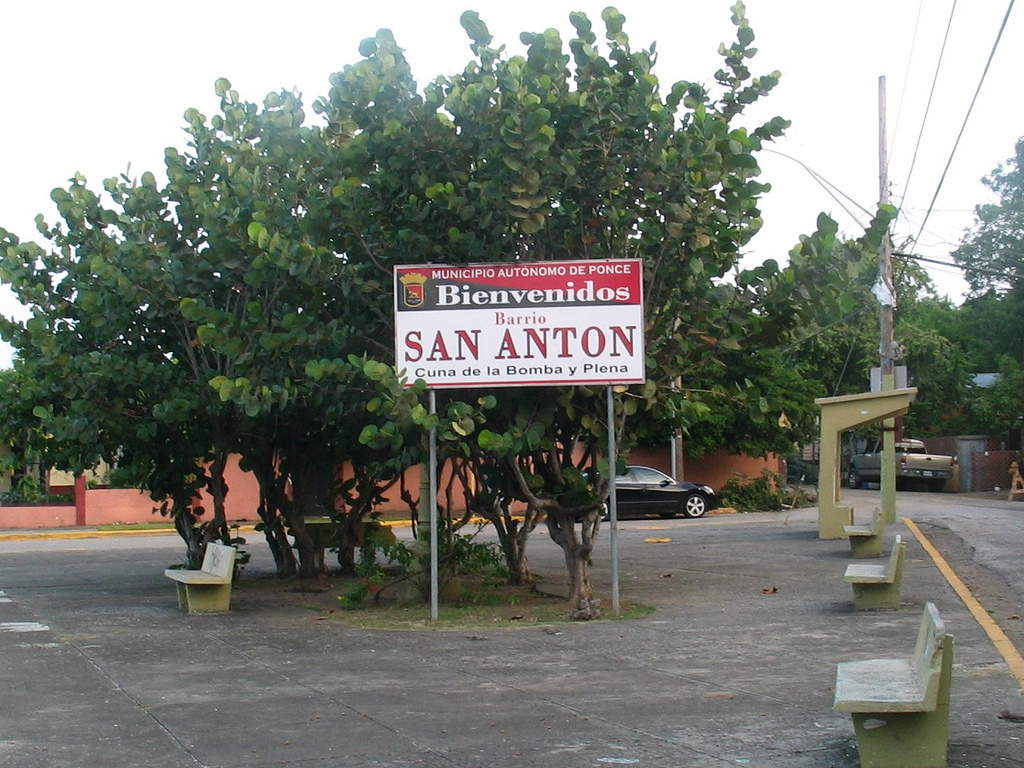
Sign showing entrance to Barrio San Antón, in Ponce, Puerto Rico

The United States Census Bureau recognizes 902 barrios in Puerto Rico. The US classifies barrios as minor civil divisions for statistical purposes. As components of each municipality, each municipality has one or more barrios. Every municipality has at least one barrio called barrio Pueblo which is home to the largest urban area of the municipality, and the political seat of the municipality. Most municipalities have a single barrio named barrio Pueblo while others, most prominently the larger municipalities like the municipality of Ponce, may have a barrio Pueblo that is made of several barrios. Florida is the municipality with the fewest barrios, while Ponce, at 31, has the most.

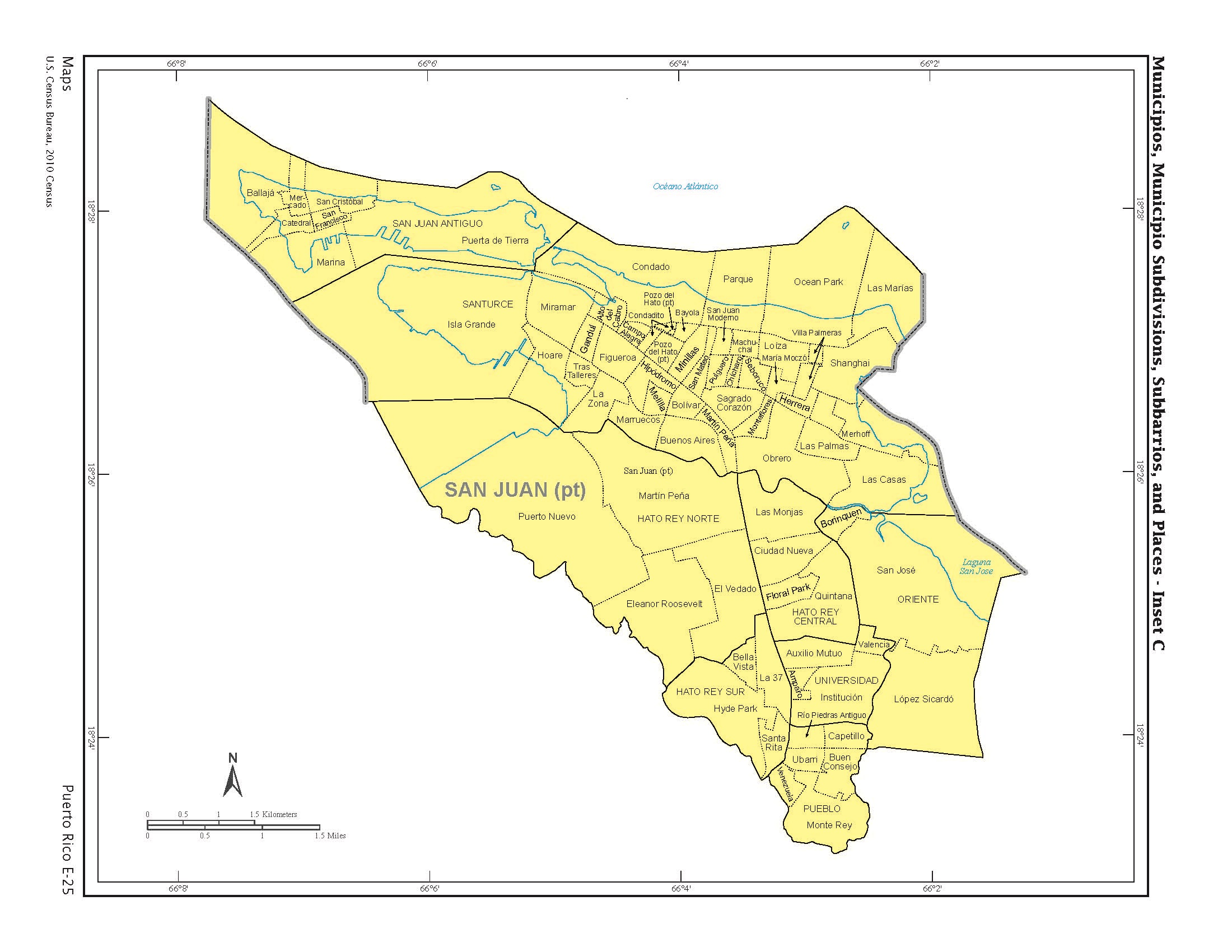
The municipality of San Juan has 18 barrios.

The US Census Bureau further breaks down some barrios in Puerto Rico into subbarrios. One such example is Santurce (in San Juan) which has 40 subbarrios. Another example is barrio Segundo in Ponce which consists of subbarrios Clausells and Baldorioty de Castro (commonly shortened to Baldorioty). With over 24 square miles (62 km^{2}), barrio Lapa in the northeast area of the municipality of Salinas, has the largest territorial area of any barrio in Puerto Rico, being larger in size than 10 of Puerto Rico's municipalities.

Another subdivision that may exist within a barrio is a comunidad, as seen in Census data. Esperanza is a comunidad in Vieques and an example of a subdivision of a barrio which is not called a subbarrio but is called instead a comunidad. Outside of the Census data and in Puerto Rico barrios are divided by sectors. Municipios list their barrios and the sectors within them. Cañaboncito barrio in Caguas, for example, has over 90 sectors. The types of sectors (sectores) may vary, from normally sector to urbanización to reparto to barriada to residencial, among others.

== Significance ==
While in the past, barrios in Puerto Rico had political authority, each with their own elected mayor and "barrio councils", currently barrios in Puerto Rico are no longer vested with any political authority. Their purpose was originally for the collection of taxes, but during the 1800s any political authority barrios had been centralized in the municipal governments. In 1880 Spain's Nomenclature of its Territories publication, it is stated that the municipalities were subdivided, as needed, to facilitate voting and to ease the administration of each municipality. An analysis of the 1899 Puerto Rican and Cuban census, published by the War Department and Inspector General of the United States in 1900 listed the census population numbers by barrios of Puerto Rico.

Barrio names continue to be an essential point of reference for purposes of municipal and state government property management, including land surveying and property sale, purchase, and ownership. Land and property deeds and surveys are all performed with barrio names as a mandatory reference. For example, official legal matters dealing with land and property issues are heard on the basis of municipal locations relative to the officially recognized barrios and barrio boundaries.

== Problems ==
=== Non-official usage ===
The 902 barrios of Puerto Rico represent officially established primary legal divisions of the seventy-eight municipalities that contain unique and permanent geographical land boundaries. Puerto Rico Act 68 of 7 May 1945 (Ley Num. 68 de 7 de mayo de 1945), ordered the commonwealth's Planning Board to prepare a map of each of the municipalities and each of the barrios within said municipalities and the corresponding barrio names. Said map and list of barrio names constitute the officially established primary legal barrio divisions.

However, often the word "barrio" is also (mistakenly) used in Puerto Rico in an unofficial manner to represent a populated sector within a barrio, and in this latter case the name of the sector can be—and most often is—different from the official barrio where it is located. An example of this non-official usage is the reference to Puerto Rican nationalist Don Pedro Albizu Campos as having been born in barrio Tenerias in Ponce yet, there has never been a barrio Tenerias in Ponce; Tenerias is a populated sector—a settlement—of barrio Machuelo Abajo. The problem is that populated places have been adopting names for themselves that do not appear in the official government maps, because such maps have not been updated, and there is no system in place for such updates.

=== Quality control and GPS plotting ===
Puerto Rico barrio boundaries were established using landmarks such as "the top of a mountain", "the lot owned by Franscico Mattei", "the peak of a mountain ridge", "an almond tree" (árbol de húcar), and "to origin of Loco River". (Note: For numerous examples of this usage, see "Mapa de Municipios y Barrios: Ponce, Memoria Num. 27." Estado Libre Asociado de Puerto Rico. Oficina del Gobernador. Junta de Planificacion. Santurce, Puerto Rico. Rafael Pico, Presidente. 1953.) When describing the boundaries of Las Piedras, the official 1952 document by the Puerto Rico Planning Board stated "the border continues through Cándido Márquez's and Jesús Barrio's farms until reaching a mamey tree. This tree is about 50 meters south of Leoncio Rivera's home..." As these descriptors tended to lend themselves to ambiguity and other problems, there was a 2002 initiative by the University of Puerto Rico to describe boundaries using GPS technology. The GPS coordinates of barrios of Puerto Rico are available via a Puerto Rico government portal.

== See also ==
- Barrios of San Juan, Puerto Rico
- List of communities in Puerto Rico
- List of barrios of Ponce, Puerto Rico
- Pueblos in Puerto Rico
