= Baquero =

Baquero is a surname. Notable people with the surname include:

- Andrés Baquero (1853–1916), Spanish writer and academic
- Andy Baquero (born 1994), Cuban footballer
- Gastón Baquero (1916–1997), Cuban poet and writer
- Gloria E. Baquero Lleras, Puerto Rican educator and university administrator
- Gustavo Baquero, Venezuelan engineer, academic and executive
- Ivana Baquero (born 1994), Spanish actor
- Lynda Baquero (born 1967), American journalist
- Mariano Baquero (1838–c. 1890), Spanish painter
- Martha Fierro Baquero (born 1977), Ecuadorian chess player
- Pedro Baquero (born 1980), Spanish footballer
- Pedro Centeno Baquero (born 1970), Filipino clergyman

== See also ==
- Vaquero (disambiguation)
