= APA International Humanitarian Award =

The APA International Humanitarian Award is an award of the American Psychological Association that "recognizes extraordinary humanitarian service and activism by a psychologist or a team of psychologists, including professional and/or volunteer work conducted primarily in the field with underserved populations."

== Recipients ==
Source: APA

- 1998/1999 Nila Kapor-Stanulovic
- 2001 Karen L. Hanscom
- 2002 Elizabeth Lira
- 2004 Chris E. Stout
- 2005 Eduardo Almeida
- 2006 Center for Victims of Torture -- Guinea International Mental Health Team
- 2007 Gerard A. (Jerry) Jacobs
- 2008 Joseph Prewitt Diaz, Gundelina Velazco
- 2009 Michael Wessells
- 2012 John Thoburn
- 2013 M. Brinton Lykes
- 2014 Malcolm MacLachlan
- 2015 Sunil Bhatia
- 2016 Alan Poling
- 2017 Kathryn L. Norsworthy
- 2018 Guerda M. Nicolas
- 2019 Gargi Roysircar
- 2020 Niels Peter Rygaard
- 2021 Bhava Nath Poudya
- 2022 Lucy Wairimu Mukuria
- 2023 Garth Neufeld
- 2024 Jafar Ahmad and Zeinab Musavi

== See also ==
- List of psychology awards
