= Fred Crespo =

American politician

Member of the Illinois House of Representatives from the 44th district
- Incumbent
- Assumed office January 2007
- Preceded by: Terry R. Parke

Personal details
- Born: 1957 or 1958 (age 67–68)
- Party: Democratic (suspended: 2025–present)
- Spouse: Dorothy
- Education: Loyola University, Chicago (BS); Illinois Institute of Technology

Fred Crespo (born 1957/1958) is a Democratic member of the Illinois House of Representatives, representing the 44th district since 2007. This district lies entirely within Cook County and includes all of Streamwood, approximately half of Hoffman Estates and Hanover Park, and portions of Schaumburg, Elgin, and Bartlett.

== Early life, education and career ==
Crespo attended Loyola University, Chicago.

== Illinois General Assembly ==
Crespo has been a member of the following Legislative Committees:

- Appropriations for General Services, Chair
- Education Policy, Chair
- Elementary and Secondary Education, Vice Chair
- Mass Transit, Member
- Public Utilities, Member
- Small Business Empowerment and Workforce Development, Member
- Subcommittee on Mandates, Member
- Tourism and Conventions, Member

== Achievements ==
Crespo provided assistance for the construction of the much-needed Alexian Brothers Women's and Children's Hospital in the Northwest Suburbs of Chicago.

Crespo worked with the Village of Hoffman Estates to secure funding for a full interchange at Interstate 90 and Barrington Road which, which was completed in 2016.

Crespo worked collaboratively with the Village of Hanover Park, Harper Community College and Elgin Community College to open the Work and Education Center in Hanover Park in 2014.

In 2018, then-Governor-elect J. B. Pritzker appointed Crespo to the Educational Success transition committee, which is responsible for state education policy.

== Electoral history ==
Illinois 44th State House District General Election, 2006
Party	Candidate	Votes	%
Democratic	Fred Crispo	10,292	52.33
Republican	Terry R. Parke (incumbent)	9,377	47.67
Total votes		19,669	100.0

Illinois 44th State House District General Election, 2008
Party	Candidate	Votes	%
Democratic	Fred Crespo (incumbent)	22,323	68.34
Republican	Margaret M. "Peggy" Brothman	10,344	31.66
Total votes		32,667	100.0

Illinois 44th State House District General Election, 2010
Party	Candidate	Votes	%
Democratic	Fred Crespo (incumbent)	11,321	53.38
Republican	Billie D. Roth	9,886	46.62
Total votes		21,207	100.0

Illinois 44th State House District General Election, 2012
Party	Candidate	Votes	%
Democratic	Fred Crespo (incumbent)	19,808	63.85
Republican	Joann Franzen	11,217	36.15
Total votes		31,025	100.0

Illinois 44th State House District General Election, 2014
Party	Candidate	Votes	%
Democratic	Fred Crespo (incumbent)	10,715	54.72
Republican	Ramiro Jaurez	8,866	45.28
Total votes		19,581	100.0

Illinois 44th State House District General Election, 2016
Party	Candidate	Votes	%
Democratic	Fred Crespo (incumbent)	22,102	62.79
Republican	Katy Dolan Baumer	13,098	37.21
Total votes		35,200	100.0

Illinois 44th State House District General Election, 2018
Party	Candidate	Votes	%
Democratic	Fred Crespo (incumbent)	18,028	65.59
Republican	Katy Dolan Baumer	9,459	34.41
Total votes		27,487	100.0

== Awards and recognition ==
Crespo was recognized with the Illinois Office of Tourism Lincoln Award for his commitment to economic development in the State of Illinois.

Crespo has been recognized for his ongoing commitment and contributions to mental health concerns with the Legislator of the Year Award from the Illinois Psychological Association, the Illinois Hero Award from the National Association of Mental Illness (NAMI) and the Legislator of the Year Award from the National Association of Anorexia Nervosa and Associated Disorders (ANAD). Women In Need Growing Stronger (WINGS) recognized Crespo for his efforts to end domestic violence, including his strong support for Civil Order of Protection laws in the State.

== Personal life ==
Crespo and his wife Dorothy have two children.
