= Chris Stout (psychologist) =

American psychologist

Dr Chris E. Stout
- Born: Dallas, Texas
- Education: Purdue University; The University of Chicago’s Graduate School of Business; Forest Institute
- Occupation: Clinical psychologist
- Known for: Founding director of the Center for Global Initiatives.
- Spouse: Dr. Karen Beckstrand
- Children: Grayson; Annika

Dr. Chris E. Stout is a licensed clinical psychologist who has a varied background in multiple domains. He is the founding director of the Center for Global Initiatives (CGI) which was ranked as a Top Healthcare Nonprofit by GreatNonprofits. His entrepreneurial experience is demonstrated in multiple ventures that include the areas of financial management, healthcare start-ups, engineering, two dot-coms, real estate, and executive coaching. He currently is Vice President of the Department of Research at ATI Physical Therapy, a national Sports Medicine and Rehabilitation organization.

== Career ==
Dr. Stout currently is the Vice President of the Department of Research and Data Analytics at ATI Physical Therapy, a national Sports Medicine and Rehabilitation organization. He is also a clinical full professor in the College of Medicine at the University of Illinois at Chicago, Department of Psychiatry; an advisory board member to the College of Medicine’s Center for Global Health; a fellow in the School of Public Health Leadership Institute, and was a core faculty at the International Center on Responses to Catastrophes at the University of Illinois-Chicago. He held an academic appointment in the Northwestern University Feinberg School of Medicine’s Department of Psychiatry and Behavioral Sciences’ Mental Health Services and Policy Program, and was a visiting professor in the Department of Health Systems Management at Rush University. He served as a non-governmental organization special representative to the United Nations.

He has served as Chief of Psychology, Director of Research, and Senior VP of an integrated behavioral healthcare system during a 15-year tenure. He served as Illinois’ first Chief of Psychological Services for the Department of Human Services/Division of Mental Health–having made him the highest ranking psychologist in the State of Illinois and a committed reformer of psychology within the governmental setting. He also served as Chief Clinical Information Officer for the State’s Division of Mental Health in 2004–a Cabinet-level position. He is the first psychologist to have an invited appointment to the Lake County Board of Health. He was elected to APA’s Committee on International Relations in Psychology and served three years, one of which as Co-Chair.

He was appointed by the Secretary of the US Department of Commerce to the Board of Examiners for the Malcolm Baldrige National Quality Award. He is on the Advisory Board of the American Board of Independent Medical Examiners, as well as numerous other organizations. He is one of 100 world-wide leaders appointed to the World Economic Forum’s (WEF) Global Leaders of Tomorrow 2000 – joining the ranks of Tony Blair, Jody Foster, Bill Gates, J.K. Rowling, and Lance Armstrong, and he was an Invited Faculty at the Annual Meeting in Davos.

He was invited by the Club de Madrid and Safe-Democracy to serve on the Madrid-11 Countering Terrorism Task Force. He is the founder of GordianKnot, LLC, an executive leadership and startup advisory.

Dr. Stout is a Fellow in three Divisions of the American Psychological Association, past-President of the Illinois Psychological Association, and is a Distinguished Practitioner in the National Academies of Practice. He was appointed as a Special (Citizen) Ambassador and Delegation Leader to South Africa and Eastern Europe by the Eisenhower Foundation. He serves as Acquisitions Editor for the Journal of Disability Medicine, and is the Series Editor of Contemporary Psychology (Praeger) and “Getting Started” (Wiley & Sons). He produced the critically acclaimed four volume set The Psychology of Terrorism and more recently, the highly praised and award–winning three volume set, The New Humanitarians, and is an Amazon.com Best Selling Author (reaching a #11 ranking).

He has been awarded the APA International Humanitarian Award by the American Psychological Association.
