= Carmen Z. Claudio =

Puerto Rican academic administrator (born 1947)

- Born: December 29, 1947 (age 78); San Lorenzo, Puerto Rico
- Education: Interamerican University of Puerto Rico (EdD)
- Occupations: Educator; university administrator

Carmen Zoraida Claudio (December 29, 1947, San Lorenzo, Puerto Rico) is a Puerto Rican educator and university administrator. Claudio is the president of Thomas Alva Edison School. She was the president of National University College where she serves on the board of trustees. She is a graduate in Doctor of Education (EdD), Planning and Evaluation from the Interamerican University of Puerto Rico. Claudio was succeeded by Gloria E. Baquero Lleras. She has worked in education for over 40 years. Claudio was the president of the Asociación de Educación Privada de Puerto Rico.

== See also ==
- List of women presidents or chancellors of co-ed colleges and universities
