= Aderlin Rodríguez =

Dominican baseball player (born 1991)

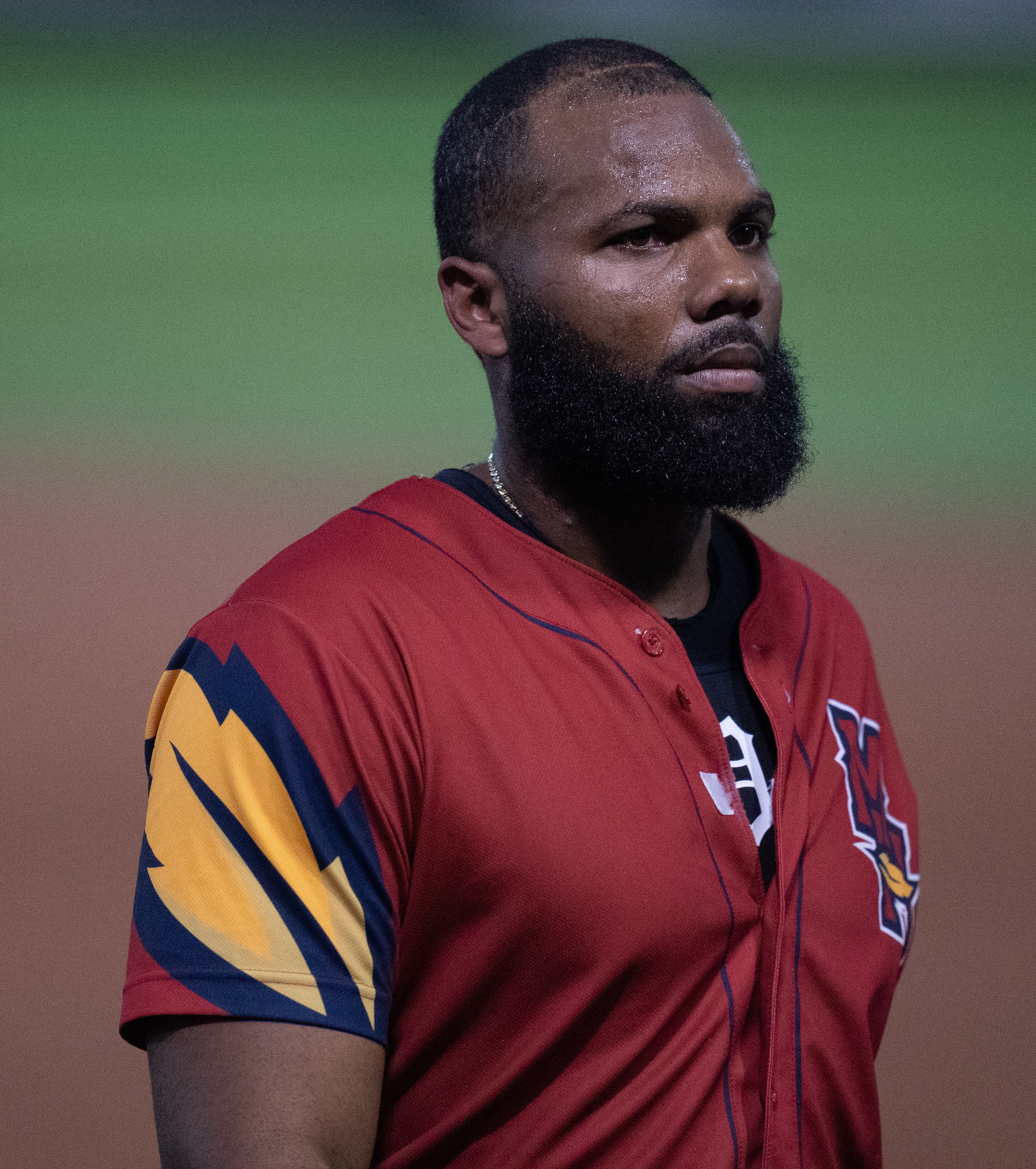
- Rodríguez with the Toledo Mud Hens in 2021

Bravos de León – No. 19
- First baseman / Third baseman
- Born: November 18, 1991 (age 34); Santo Domingo, Dominican Republic
- Bats: Right Throws: Right

Professional debut
- NPB: June 19, 2020, for the Orix Buffaloes
- KBO: May 5, 2026, for the Kia Tigers

NPB statistics (through 2022 season)
- Batting average: .202
- Home runs: 8
- Runs batted in: 34

KBO statistics (through 2026 season)
- Batting average: .264
- Home runs: 10
- Runs batted in: 31
- Stats at Baseball Reference

Teams
- Orix Buffaloes (2020); Hanshin Tigers (2022); Kia Tigers (2026)

Aderlin Rodríguez (born November 18, 1991), nicknamed "A-Rod", is a Dominican professional baseball corner infielder for the Bravos de León of the Mexican League. He has previously played in Nippon Professional Baseball (NPB) for the Orix Buffaloes and Hanshin Tigers, and in the KBO League for the Kia Tigers.

== Career ==
=== New York Mets ===
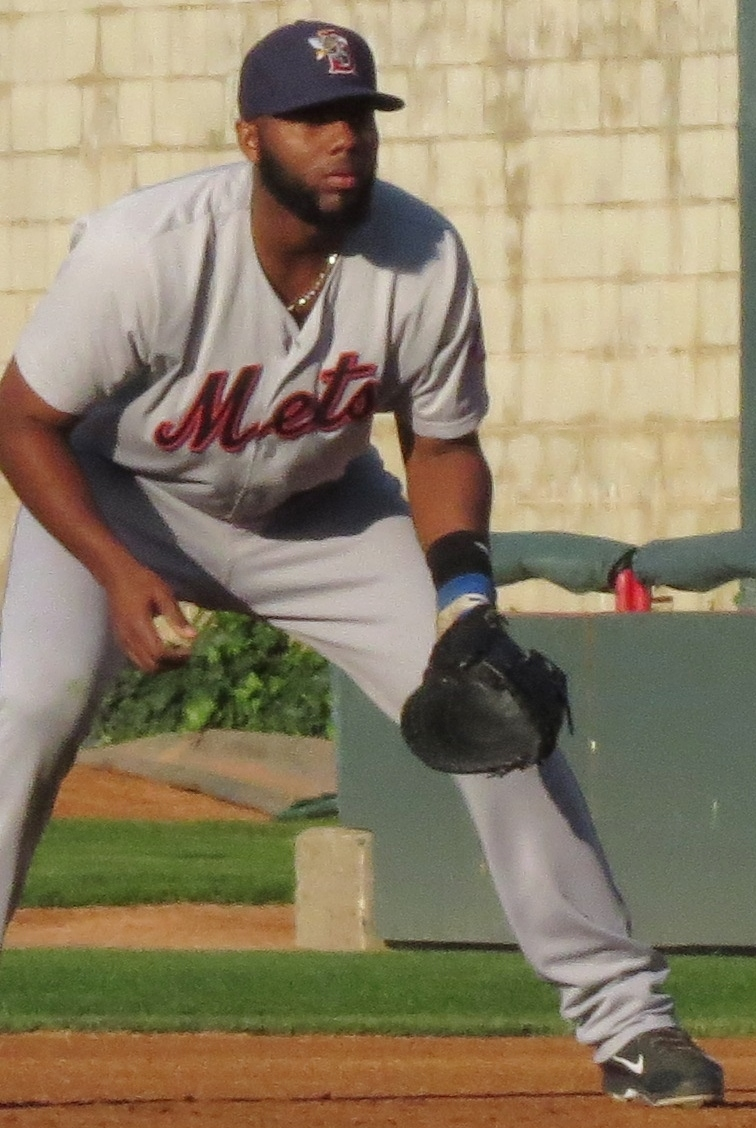
Rodríguez with the Binghamton Mets in 2015

On July 2, 2008, Rodríguez signed a minor league contract with the New York Mets organization that included a $600,000 signing bonus. He made his professional debut with the rookie-level Gulf Coast League Mets in 2009. Rodríguez split the next year with the rookie-level Kingsport Mets and Single-A Savannah Sand Gnats, slashing a combined .300/.350/.532 with 14 home runs and 59 RBI. He remained in Single-A for the 2011 season, hitting .221/.265/.372 with 17 home runs and 78 RBI in 131 games for Savannah.

The next year, Rodríguez split the season between Savannah and the High-A St. Lucie Mets, batting .263/.321/.476 with 24 home runs and 83 RBI in 125 contests. He remained in St. Lucie in 2013, slashing .260/.295/.427 with 9 home runs and 41 RBI in 264 plate appearances. In 2014, Rodríguez slashed .242/.284/.366 in 89 games for St. Lucie. He began the 2015 season in Double-A with the Binghamton Mets, but was released on July 15, 2015, after batting .253/.288/.461 in 63 games.

=== Seattle Mariners ===
On July 21, 2015, Rodríguez signed a minor league contract with the Seattle Mariners organization. He made 44 appearances for the Double-A Jackson Generals, batting .206/.262/.335 with three home runs and 16 RBI. Rodríguez elected free agency following the season on November 6.

=== Baltimore Orioles ===
On January 18, 2016, Rodríguez signed a minor league deal with the Baltimore Orioles and received an invitation to Spring Training. He did not make the club out of spring and was assigned to the High-A Frederick Keys. He was named a Carolina League all-star in 2016, and batted .304/.359/.532 with 26 home runs and 93 RBI on the season.

In 2017, Rodríguez played for the Double-A Bowie Baysox, hitting .279/.341/.471 with 22 home runs and 76 RBI in 125 games for the club. Rodríguez elected free agency following the season on November 6.

On December 22, 2017, Rodríguez re-signed with the Orioles on a new minor league contract. He spent the 2018 season with Bowie, hitting .286/.335/478 in 128 contests. On November 2, 2018, Rodríguez elected free agency.

=== San Diego Padres ===
On December 21, 2018, Rodríguez signed a minor league contract with the San Diego Padres and received an invitation to Spring Training. Rodríguez did not make the major league club and was reassigned to the Triple–A El Paso Chihuahuas, with whom he would spend the entire season, slashing .321/.363/.634 with 19 home runs and 64 RBI. He elected free agency following the season on November 4, 2019.

=== Orix Buffaloes ===
On December 23, 2019, Rodríguez signed with the Orix Buffaloes of the Nippon Professional Baseball (NPB). On June 19, 2020, Rodríguez made his NPB debut. Rodríguez batted .218/.280/.363 with 6 home runs and 25 RBI in 59 games for the Buffaloes in 2020. On December 2, 2020, he became a free agent.

=== Detroit Tigers ===
On January 16, 2021, Rodríguez signed a minor league contract with the Detroit Tigers. Rodríguez was named Triple-A East Region MVP for the 2021 season, hitting .290 with 29 home runs and 94 RBI in 116 games. On November 9, Rodríguez declined a minor league assignment and became a free agent.

=== San Diego Padres (second stint) ===
On March 13, 2022, Rodríguez signed a minor league contract with the San Diego Padres. In 45 appearances for the Triple-A El Paso Chihuahuas, he batted .272/.342/.538 with 12 home runs and 46 RBI. Rodríguez was released by the Padres organization on June 15.

=== Hanshin Tigers ===
On July 11, 2022, Rodríguez signed with the Hanshin Tigers of Nippon Professional Baseball. He made 24 appearances for Hanshin down the stretch, batting .154/.200/.277 with two home runs and nine RBI. Rodríguez became a free agent following the season.

=== Toros de Tijuana ===
On May 5, 2023, Rodriguez signed with the Toros de Tijuana of the Mexican League. In 78 games for Tijuana, he slashed .311/.383/.608 with 25 home runs and 77 RBI.

Rodríguez made 46 appearances for Tijuana in 2024, batting .216/.290/.463 with 10 home runs, 25 RBI, and three stolen bases. Rodríguez became a free agent following the season.

=== Bravos de León ===
On October 14, 2024, Rodríguez signed with the Bravos de León of the Mexican League. Rodríguez made 35 appearances for León in 2025, slashing .351/.374/.784 with 16 home runs and 31 RBI.

=== Toros de Tijuana (second stint) ===
On May 29, 2025, Rodríguez was traded to the Toros de Tijuana in exchange for Danny Ortiz, Andrew Bellatti, and Phillips Valdéz. He made 54 appearances for Tijuana during the remainder of the season, slashing .326/.366/.639 with 19 home runs, 65 RBI, and one stolen base.

Rodríguez played in seven games for the Toros in 2026, hitting .321/.387/.321 with no home runs and two RBI.

=== Kia Tigers ===
On May 4, 2026, Rodríguez signed a six-week contract with the Kia Tigers of the KBO League as an injury replacement for Harold Castro. In 31 appearances for the Tigers, he batted .274/.317/.573 with 10 home runs and 31 RBI. On June 12, Rodríguez opted not to sign a contract extension with Kia and became a free agent.

=== Toros de Tijuana (third stint) ===
On June 19, 2026, Rodríguez signed with the Toros de Tijuana of the Mexican League. He made 36 appearances for Tijuana, slashing .208/.255/.323 with four home runs and 20 RBI.

=== Bravos de León (second stint) ===
On August 4, 2026, Rodríguez and Luis Gutiérrez were traded to the Bravos de León of the Mexican League.
