= Raudy Read =

Dominican baseball player (born 1993)

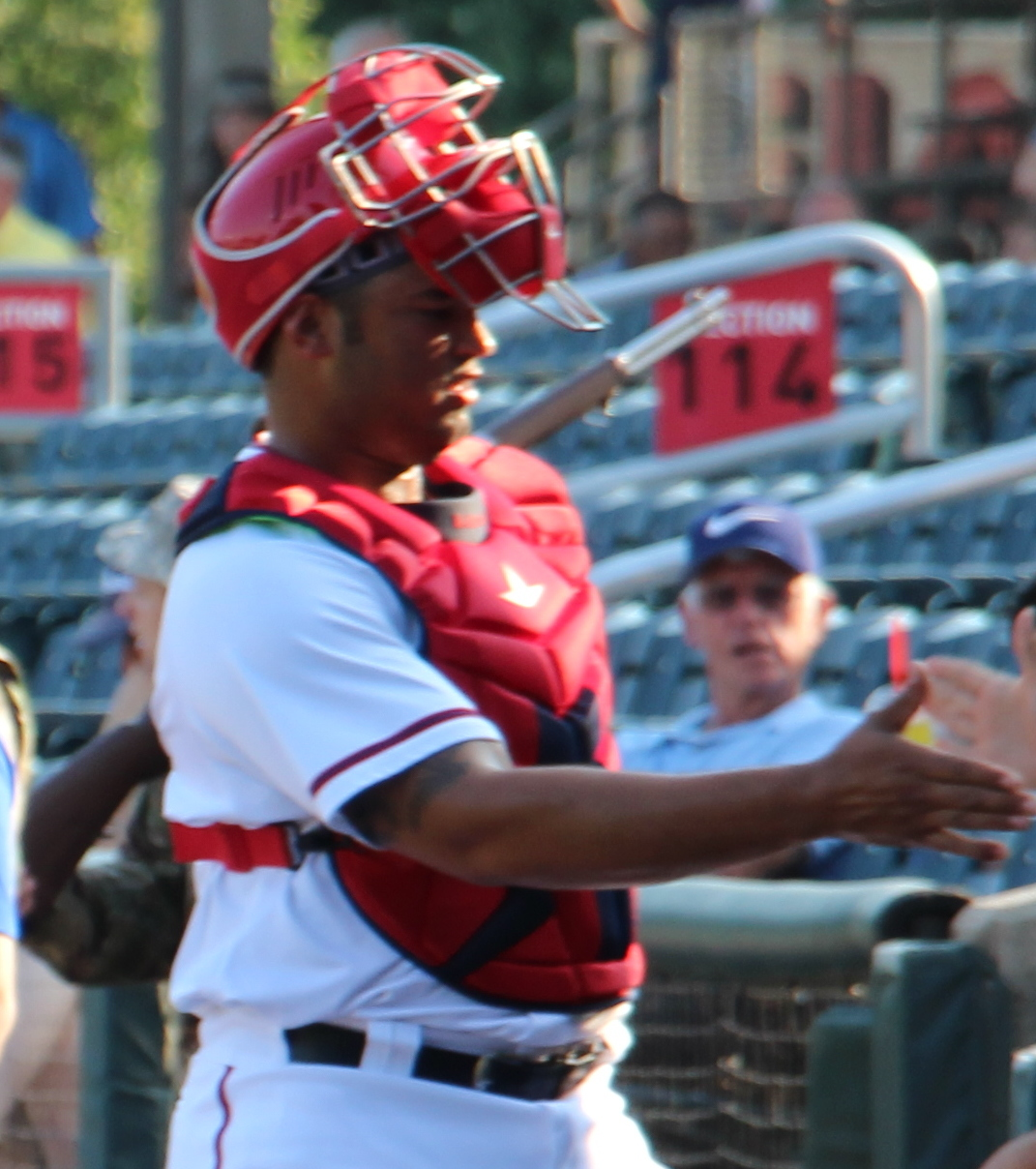
- Read with the Harrisburg Senators in 2018

Free agent
- Catcher
- Born: October 29, 1993 (age 32); San José de Ocoa, Peravia, Dominican Republic
- Bats: Right Throws: Right

MLB debut
- September 3, 2017, for the Washington Nationals

MLB statistics (through 2019 season)
- Batting average: .250
- Home runs: 0
- Runs batted in: 0
- Stats at Baseball Reference

Teams
- Washington Nationals (2017, 2019)

Raudy Miguel Read Placencia (born October 29, 1993) is a Dominican professional baseball catcher who is a free agent. He has previously played in Major League Baseball (MLB) for the Washington Nationals.

== Career ==
=== Washington Nationals ===
Read signed with the Washington Nationals as an international free agent on January 24, 2011. He spent the 2011 and 2012 seasons playing in the Dominican Republic with the Dominican Summer League Nationals in the rookie-level Dominican Summer League. He batted .157 with four home runs and 22 runs batted in (RBIs) in 42 games in 2011 and improved to .251 with nine home runs and 47 RBIs in 62 games in 2012.

In 2013, Read played in the rookie-level Gulf Coast League for the Gulf Coast League Nationals, who that year finished their regular season with a record of 49–9, giving them the highest winning percentage (.845) for a full regular season ever achieved by a minor-league baseball team based in the United States. The team then won all three of its playoff games, defeating the Gulf Coast League Pirates in a single-game semifinal playoff and sweeping the Gulf Coast League Red Sox in the best-of-three league championship series, to become the 2013 Gulf Coast League champions. Read appeared in 40 games during the championship season, batting .252 with two home runs, 17 RBIs, and two stolen bases. Read spent 2014 with the Auburn Doubledays of the Low-A New York-Penn League, appearing in 57 games and hitting .281 with six home runs and 32 RBIs. He continued to rise through the Washington Nationals's minor-league system, splitting 2015 between the Hagerstown Suns of the Single-A South Atlantic League and the Potomac Nationals of the High-A Carolina League, hitting .244 with five home runs and 36 RBIs in 82 games with the Suns and going 7-for-18 (.389) with two doubles and five RBIs in five games with Potomac. He spent all of 2016 with Potomac, playing in 101 games and hitting .262 with nine home runs and 41 RBIs.

The Nationals added Read to their 40-man roster after the season on November 18, 2016. Read was promoted to the Harrisburg Senators of the Double-A Eastern League for 2017. A right-handed hitter, he got off to a hot start at the Double-A level, hitting .345 with a pair of home runs in April before cooling off somewhat in May. Read was named to the Eastern League's All-Star roster for the Western Division in 2017.

Better regarded for his right-handed bat and arm strength than for his defense and blocking skills behind the plate, Read was described by Baseball America in 2017 as a team leader with a "take-charge" attitude. The publication ranked him in July 2017 as the Nationals' ninth-best prospect, while MLB Pipeline's midseason prospect ranking listed him at fourteenth-best in the organization. Both considered him the team's best overall catching prospect.

After hitting .265 with 17 home runs and 61 runs batted in 108 games for the Senators, Read was called up to the major leagues for the first time on September 1, 2017, when the Washington Nationals added him to the roster along with two minor-league pitchers when major-league rosters expanded for the last few weeks of the 2017 season. Read pinch-hit and grounded out on September 3, 2017, in his major-league debut against the Milwaukee Brewers. The next day, he hit an infield single deflected off the glove of Miami Marlins pitcher Jarlin García for his first major-league hit.

On February 7, 2018, Read became the first rostered player in Washington Nationals team history to be suspended for violating MLB's policy against the use of performance-enhancing drugs. He received an 80-game suspension due to a positive test for the steroid Boldenone during the 2017 season. He denied using steroids and said he would appeal the suspension. He was replaced on the Nationals' roster by utility infielder Matt Reynolds. Read would play in 53 minor league games split between Harrisburg and the Triple-A Syracuse Chiefs without appearing in a major league game due to his suspension.

Read spent the majority of the 2019 season with the Triple-A Fresno Grizzlies, batting .275/.317/.546 with 20 home runs and 60 RBI. He also made 6 appearances for the big league club, going 1-for-11 with a single. Read did not appear in a game for Washington in 2020. On October 13, 2020, Read was outrighted off of the Nationals’ 40-man roster. He split the 2021 season between Washington's rookie-league affiliate, the Single-A Fredericksburg Nationals, and the Triple-A Rochester Red Wings. In 28 total games, he hit .284/.361/.590 with 8 home runs and 21 RBI. He elected minor league free agency following the season on November 7, 2021.

=== Chicago White Sox ===
On February 11, 2022, Read signed a minor league contract with the Chicago White Sox. He was assigned to the Double-A Birmingham Barons to start the season. He appeared in 88 games split between Birmingham and the Triple-A Charlotte Knights, slashing .303/.396/.557 with 18 home runs and 71 RBI between the two affiliates. He was released by the organization on September 18.

=== Spire City Ghost Hounds ===
On February 20, 2023, Read signed with the Spire City Ghost Hounds of the Atlantic League of Professional Baseball. In 81 games for the Ghost Hounds, Read batted .305/.351/.551 with 20 home runs and 53 RBI.

=== Pericos de Puebla ===
On October 10, 2023, Read signed with the Pericos de Puebla of the Mexican League. On November 2, Read was drafted by the Southern Maryland Blue Crabs in the Ghost Hounds dispersal draft. In 71 games for Puebla in 2024, he slashed .290/.326/.577 with 17 home runs and 66 RBI.

=== Toros de Tijuana ===
On November 8, 2024, Read and Danny Ortiz were traded to the Toros de Tijuana of the Mexican League in exchange for Wendolyn Bautista. In 18 games for Tijuana, he hit .338/.411/.615 with three home runs, 15 RBI, and one stolen base. On February 5, 2026, Read was released by the Toros.

=== Leones de Yucatán ===
On June 25, 2026, Read signed with the Leones de Yucatán of the Mexican League. In 23 games he hit .247/.309/.438 with 3 home runs and 17 RBIs. He was released on August 1.

== Personal life ==
Read is from San José de Ocoa in the southern Dominican Republic, about 70 miles (112 km) from the capital of Santo Domingo. Prior to being called up to the major leagues on September 1, 2017, for a series at Miller Park against the Milwaukee Brewers, Read had never attended a regular-season Major League Baseball game.
