= Danny Ortiz (baseball) =

Puerto Rican baseball player (born 1990)

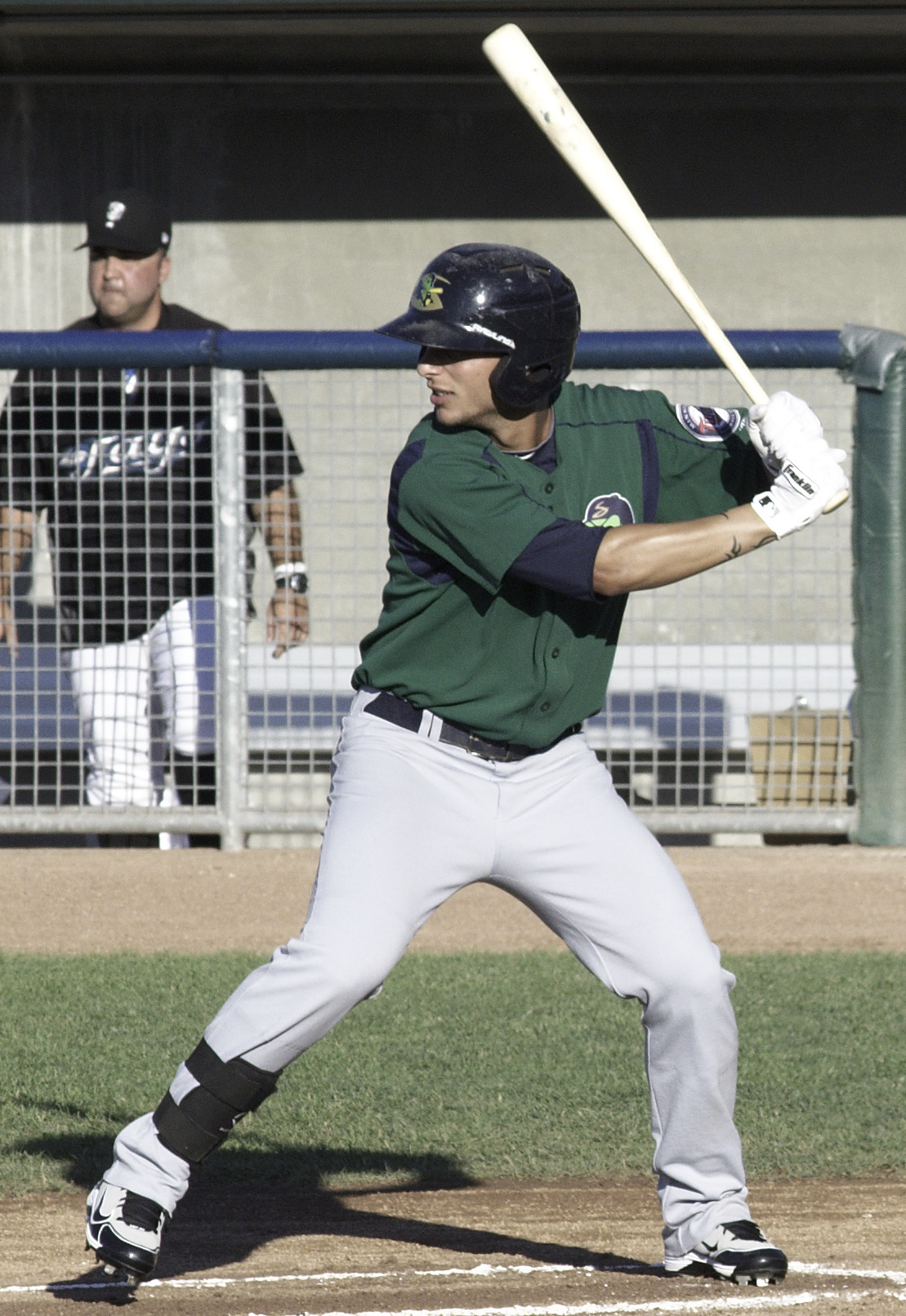
- Ortiz with the Beloit Snappers in 2011

Hagerstown Flying Boxcars – No. 20
- Outfielder
- Born: January 5, 1990 (age 36); Caguas, Puerto Rico
- Bats: Left Throws: Left

MLB debut
- April 29, 2017, for the Pittsburgh Pirates

MLB statistics (through 2017 season)
- Batting average: .083
- Home runs: 0
- Run batted in: 0
- Stats at Baseball Reference

Teams
- Pittsburgh Pirates (2017)

Daniel Ortiz (born January 5, 1990) is a Puerto Rican professional baseball outfielder for the Hagerstown Flying Boxcars of the Atlantic League of Professional Baseball. He has previously played in Major League Baseball (MLB) for the Pittsburgh Pirates.

== Career ==
=== Minnesota Twins ===
Ortiz was drafted in the fourth round (126th overall) by the Minnesota Twins in the 2008 MLB draft out of Benjamin Harrison School in Cayey, Puerto Rico. After signing for $253,000, Ortiz reported to the GCL Twins where batted .274 with two home runs and 27 runs batted in over 48 games. Daniel was forced to miss the 2009 season after undergoing left knee surgery during the offseason. Ortiz did little to change that perception over the next two years, hitting .259 with 11 homers and 43 runs batted in over 62 games with the Elizabethton Twins in 2010 and .239 with 10 homers and 71 runs batted in the following year with the Low-A Beloit Snappers. For the 2012 season, Ortiz began the year back with the Snappers but quickly proved that he was a changed player, hitting .299 with 8 runs and 13 runs batted in through only 22 games and earning himself a spot on the midseason Midwest League all-star team. Ortiz started the month of May with the High-A Fort Myers Miracle. Over the rest of the season, Ortiz continued to hit for both average and power, finishing with a .269 batting average, eight home runs and 35 runs batted in. Ortiz was promoted again to begin the 2013 year, playing for the Double-A New Britain Rock Cats. Ortiz hit a career high 12 home runs to go along with a .258 batting average and 60 runs batted in. In 2014 Ortiz remained with the Rock Cats for 48 games, and he owned a .500 slugging percentage, a .325 batting average, and 31 runs batted in before an early June call up to the Rochester Red Wings. In 55 games since his promotion, Ortiz hit 7 home runs, drove in 29 runs, recorded a slugging percentage of .456, and owned a .257 batting average.

=== Pittsburgh Pirates ===
Ortiz signed a minor league contract with the Pittsburgh Pirates on November 20, 2015. He spent the 2016 season in Triple-A with the Indianapolis Indians, batting .236/.275/.415 with 15 home runs and 61 RBI in 110 games. Ortiz elected free agency following the season on November 7, 2016.

On January 9, 2017, Ortiz re–signed with the Pirates organization on a minor league contract. The Pirates promoted him to the major leagues for the first time on April 29. Ortiz appeared in 9 games with the Pirates in 2017, notching one hit in 12-bats. On August 5, Ortiz was designated for assignment by the Pirates, who later sent him outright to Indianapolis on August 7. He elected free agency following the season on November 6.

=== Philadelphia Phillies ===
On January 3, 2018, Ortiz signed a minor league contract with the Philadelphia Phillies that included an invitation to spring training. He played in 118 games for the Triple–A Lehigh Valley IronPigs, hitting .232/.270/.398 with 15 home runs and 61 RBI. Ortiz elected free agency following the season on November 2.

=== Pericos de Puebla ===
On February 21, 2019, Ortiz signed with the Pericos de Puebla of the Mexican League. In 2019, he was a mid-season All-Star. Ortiz did not play in a game in 2020 due to the cancellation of the LMB season because of the COVID-19 pandemic.

In 2021, Ortiz played in 62 games for Puebla, he hit .294/.377/.580 with 16 home runs and 48 RBI. He made 86 appearances for the Pericos in 2022, batting .286/.351/.681 with 35 home runs and 102 RBI. Ortiz played in 87 games for Puebla in 2023, slashing .270/.325/.485 with 16 home runs and 61 RBI. With Puebla, Ortiz won the Serie del Rey.

Ortiz made 89 appearances for Puebla in 2024, he hit .283/.380/.605 with 28 home runs and 77 RBI.

=== Toros de Tijuana ===
On November 8, 2024, Ortiz and Raudy Read were traded to the Toros de Tijuana of the Mexican League in exchange for Wendolyn Bautista. He made 31 appearances for Tijuana in 2025, hitting .212/.286/.398 with five home runs, 21 RBI, and one stolen base.

=== Bravos de León ===
On May 29, 2025, Ortiz, Andrew Bellatti, and Phillips Valdéz were traded to the Bravos de León in exchange for Aderlin Rodríguez. Ortiz made 54 appearances for the Bravos, batting .291/.351/.511 with 10 home runs, 43 RBI, and three stolen bases.

=== Pericos de Puebla (second stint) ===
On January 14, 2026, Ortiz was traded back to the Pericos de Puebla of the Mexican League. In 18 appearances for the Pericos, he batted .220/.327/.488 with three home runs and 11 RBI.

=== Saraperos de Saltillo ===
On May 19, 2026, Ortiz was traded to the Saraperos de Saltillo of the Mexican League. In 24 appearances for Saltillo, he batted .237/.287/.349 with three home runs and 12 RBI. On June 21, Ortiz was released by the Saraperos.

=== Tigres de Quintana Roo ===
On June 27, 2026, Ortiz signed with the Tigres de Quintana Roo of the Mexican League. In 36 games he batted .250/.339/.354 with one home run, 9 RBIs and one stolen base.

=== Hagerstown Flying Boxcars ===
On August 19, 2026, Ortiz signed with the Hagerstown Flying Boxcars of the Atlantic League of Professional Baseball.

== See also ==
- List of Major League Baseball players from Puerto Rico
