= Vaquero (disambiguation) =

Vaquero is the Spanish word for cowherd, cattle-herder, cow-keeper, or cattle driver.

Vaquero may also refer to:

== Arts and entertainment ==
- Vaquero (film), a 2011 Argentine film
- Vaquero (band), a Mexican rock band fronted by Chetes
- Vaquero (album), a 2017 album by Aaron Watson
- Los Vaqueros, a 2006 album by Wisin & Yandel

== Geography and geology ==
- Los Vaqueros Reservoir, a man-made lake near Brentwood, California, US
- Vaquero Formation, a geologic formation in California, US, dating back to the Neogene period
- Vaqueros Formation, a sedimentary rock formation in southern California, US, of the Upper Oligocene and Lower Miocene

== People ==
- José Vaquero (1924–2006), Argentine politician
- Vaquero (wrestler), Juan Miguel Escalante Grande (born 1977), Mexican luchador enmascarado
- Vaqueiros de alzada, a northern Spanish nomadic people in the mountains of Asturias and León

== Sports teams ==
=== Professional ===
- Las Cruces Vaqueros, a baseball team in New Mexico, US
- Vaqueros F.C., a football club in Guadalajara, Jalisco, Mexico
- Vaqueros de Bayamón, a Puerto Rican basketball team
- Vaqueros de Bayamón (baseball), a Puerto Rican baseball club 1974–2003

=== Scholastic ===
- El Capitan High School Vaqueros, Lakeside, California, US
- Santa Barbara City College Vaqueros, California, US
- Texas–Rio Grande Valley Vaqueros, University of Texas Rio Grande Valley, US

== See also ==
- Buckaroo, derived from vaquero, an English word for a cowboy
- Charro a regionally specific term for vaqueros in certain parts of Latin America
- Ruger Vaquero, a single-action revolver developed by Ruger in 1993
- Vaquera
