= Joseph O. Prewitt Díaz =

Puerto Rican psychologist (born 1943)

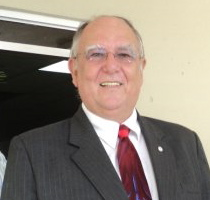
- Joseph O. Prewitt Díaz (2010) at his 50th High School Class Party
- Born: November 23, 1943 (age 82); Cayey, Puerto Rico
- Education: University of Puerto Rico (BA); University of Connecticut (Ph.D.)
- Occupation: psychologist

Notes
- Prewitt Díaz was the recipient of the American Psychological Association's 2008 International Humanitarian Award.

Joseph Orlando Prewitt Díaz (born November 23, 1943) is a retired psychologist who specialized in psychosocial theory. He received the APA International Humanitarian Award from American Psychological Association

== Early years ==
Prewitt Díaz was born in Cayey, Puerto Rico. In 1964 he represented Puerto Rico in the Encampment for Citizenship a summer youth program that encouraged volunteerism and sought to educate its participants about civic responsibility, and participation in government. Upon his return to Cayey, he joined Rev. Peter L. Pond, a theologist and community organizer and Dr. Samuel Silva Gotay, a liberation theologist in the development of VESPRA "Voluntarios en Servicio a Puerto Rico". He served as the training coordinator and outward bound instructor

== Civil Air Patrol ==
As a child he loved to fly. While in the Benjamin Harrison School in Cayey, P.R. his favorite class was aeronautics and as a result he joined the Civil Air Patrol (1956–1959). By the age of 15 he had soloed in a Piper Cub. His dream of flying "low and slow" was put on the back burner until 1988 when he rejoined the Pennsylvania Wing. He served the organization until 2000. He served as Squadron Commander, Red Cross Liaison, and Legislative Affairs Officer for the Pennsylvania Wing and achieved the rank of lieutenant colonel. During that period of time he went back to flying and achieved the Aeronautical Rating of Master Observer. He was awarded the Meritorious Service Medal and the Distinguished Service Medal for his services.

== Education ==
Prewitt Díaz completed his undergraduate studies and graduate studies in psychology and counseling psychology at the University of Puerto Rico. He completed two additional graduate degrees in the United States: educational psychology at Trinity College, and Pastoral Counseling and Spiritual Direction at Neumann College. He received his PhD degree from the University of Connecticut and pursued Post Doctoral studies at the Gestalt Institute of Cleveland.

== Fellowships ==
The World Education Fellowship 1975–1978 allowed him to study language development and cultural adjustment of Puerto Rican children in Connecticut. As a recipient of a W. K. Kellogg Foundation National Fellowship, he visited Brazil, Argentina and Mexico exploring the role of community health in improving the quality of life of resource-poor communities. A Woodrow Wilson Hispanic Fellowship resulted in the first draft of a 1994 book entitled The Psychology of Puerto Rican Migration, an ethnographic study.

== Hartford, Connecticut (1972–1979) ==
=== Bilingual Teacher Corps Project ===
He arrived in Hartford, Connecticut on December 26, 1972. He was invited to work as the In-Service Coordinator for the Teacher Corps program at the University of Hartford under the direction of Dr. Perry Zirkel. He had received a one-semester leave of absence from the University of Puerto Rico-Cayey; that was extended until August 1973. To become an In-service Coordinator for these potential teachers two things were necessary: (1) a curriculum that focused on the beginning and evolution of the Puerto Rican community in Hartford, and (2) exposure to professional Puerto Ricans who served as role models for these future teachers. During a six months period twenty-seven speakers, nine who came from Puerto Rico had the opportunity to interact with administrators, teachers, and other school personnel,

=== Project MAS ===
In July 1974, he was hired as the Acting Director of Project MAS, a special compensatory education project for limited English proficient students at Fox Elementary School, Quirk Middle School, and Hartford High School. In addition he had the additional responsibility of serving as a Bilingual School Psychologist system wide, As my tenure in Project MAS was coming to an end, Mr. Natividad Marques wrote a piece on the work that we had performed during that year.

=== Bulkeley High School ===
In October 22, 1975 he was appointed as Vice Principal at Bulkeley High School. By 1979 a team of bilingual teachers we began operating a New arrival's center for recently arrive students ages 15–18. Prof. Nestor Acevedo was the team leader of the three-person team. The goal of the program was to mainstream students. Once the student achieves in the 30th percentile of the Language Assessment Battery, they are placed in the mainstream classrooms with support Good things were happening in Bilingual Education.

By July 18, 1979, a study on the effectiveness of Bilingual Education for Puerto Rican students was able, through scientific research, to prove that students would achieve at a greater rate in the content areas if their home language were reinforced. The study discovered that without reinforcement, so-called bilingual students lost their mastery of Spanish and achieved more slowly in both languages.

== Academic Journey at Penn State University ==
Dr. Prewitt Diaz was hired as an Assistant Professor in September 1979; he remained at the University for twelve years. He resigned on September 15, 1992 with the rank of Associate Professor of Education and School Psychology. His research interests mirrored the current events reported about Puerto Ricans in the United States in the popular press, and journals. He began looking at the teaching of the English language to Puerto Rican children, and transitioned into psychometrics and the Puerto Rican child. Among his work is the translation, linguistic and cultural adaptation of several instruments Two examples are the Coppersmith Self Esteem Inventory translation and use cultural adaptation for Puerto Rican adolescents, and the translation, back translation and an interpretation of the MMPI. The composite results of these studies provided an important angle in working with Puerto Ricans in Puerto Rico and the United States: translation, back translation, and diverse meanings based on world views of people as seen in his research in the United States. His work in exploring the linguistically applicability of Standardized test, the mechanics of developing and translating test has been used in the fields of educational psychology and psychosocial support internationally

== Contributions to the Latino community in Pennsylvania ==
His weekly long trips from State College, PA to Bethlehem, Chester, Lancaster, and York provided a laboratory for graduate students, an opportunity for parents to seek advice on how to improve the academic and psychosocial well being of their children. In 1992 he was instrumental in the development of a Mental Health Clinic in Reading, Pennsylvania, affiliated to the Spanish Speaking Center. In September 1992 he left Reading, PA to serve in Hurricane Andrew in Florida and the North Eastern storm in New Jersey. He returned to Pennsylvania, this time to the Chester-Upland School District as a School Psychologist. As a result of his efforts with linguistically and behaviorally challenged children and their parents, he was awarded the 1998 Pennsylvania Education Association "Human and Civil Rights Award".

He served in the mid-1990s as a Pastor of the “El Mesías” United Methodist Church in Philadelphia, where he experienced first hand the emotional and spiritual challenges of non-English speaking people living in a large urban environment. This discernment period led him to a career change into the humanitarian assistance field with the American Red Cross International Services.

== American Red Cross volunteer and paid staff ==
Dr. Joseph O Prewitt Diaz served as volunteer for the American Red Cross since 1976, when he organized Blood drives at Bulkeley High School, Hartford, Connecticut. He served from 1992 to 2001 as a volunteer for Disaster Services of the American Red Cross.

=== American Red Cross volunteer for Disaster Services ===
During that period he served in 24 National Disaster Response operations as a mental health specialist and coordinator in floods, tornadoes, Hurricanes, air crashes, and hurricanes. Among the most prominent are Hurricane Andrew in 1992; the Los Angeles earthquake in 1994, the Oklahoma City bombing in 1995, in 1998 in Hurricane Georges as the East Region of Puerto Rico Coordinator. Following the September 11 attacks he served as a Disaster Mental Health coordinator of the Family Assistance Center in the recovery of United Airlines Flight 93 in Shanksville, PA.

=== American Red Cross International Services ===
Prewitt Diaz served as a paid staff with the American Red Cross for ten years. He was invited to become an International Delegate on August 5, 1998. He served as the Regional Program Coordinator for Central America, Global Psychosocial Advisor and the Head of Programs in India.

==== Central America ====
Prewitt Díaz helped to train Red Cross volunteers in mental health support in the wake of the January 2001 and February 2001 earthquakes. While in El Salvador he was awarded the American Red Cross Lifesaving Award.

==== South Asia ====
When the 2004 tsunami battered the shores of South Asian countries, the American Red Cross psychosocial support team based in India and led by disaster mental health expert, Joseph Prewitt Díaz, quickly responded to the devastated to Sri Lanka, the Maldives, and Indonesia to assist in developing programs. Prewitt Díaz made significant adaptations to the psychosocial support program on the basis of his extensive experience in Hurricane Mitch in Central America, the earthquake-affected area in Bhuj and the riot-torn camps in Gujarat. Part of the adaptation was to build a detailed career ladder of advanced training, enabling paid and volunteer local staff to build their knowledge and expertise over time in a well-structured process. According to Jacobs (2007) The work of Prewitt Díaz has been the foundation of a virtual quantum leap in psychological support in the South Asia region and have produced a second generation of psychological support programs.

In the critical early weeks following the tsunami, American Red Cross-trained volunteers in psychological first aid developed programs in Maldives, Sri Lanka, Indonesia and India. These psychosocial programs initiated by the American Red Cross team planned to provide service to the children and their families in communities and schools. Five years later psychosocial support services have been provided to more than 733,700 people). Dr. Prewitt Diaz served as the Global Psychosocial Support technical advisor since 2005. He developed the response strategy for the 2005 tsunami, and led a team of specialist in Indonesia, India, Maldives, and Sri Lanka. The project lasted five years, a meta-evaluation reports that "the PSP project was adapted to the local culture in each country. The impact was the large number of ordinary people, especially women, got involved in a project that brought hope, taught them new skills, and increased their feeling of self-efficacy. In the five-year duration the PSP program served 733,700 and trained over 29,000 PSP technicians

He represented the American Red Cross as a member of the team of 20 experts that drafted the Inter-Agency Standing Committee IASC Mental Health and Psychosocial Support International Guidelines. This effort earned Prewitt Díaz a Special Achievement Reward in recognition of the extraordinary results achieved through intensive problem solving, innovation and creativity. He was also awarded the Tiffany Award (the highest award given by the American Red Cross to an employee or volunteer).

== Honors and awards ==
Prewitt Díaz has been recognized for his outstanding achievements and contributions to the education and well-being marginalized children and youth by two Pennsylvania governors. He received the Pennsylvania Heritage Award from Governor Robert P. Casey in 1990, and the Latino Pride Award from Governor Tom Ridge in 1999. In 1996, he was presented the Adjunct Faculty Award while teaching Psychology at Alvernia College in Reading, PA PAGovernor Ella Grasso of Connecticut had honored him with an appointment as a trustee to the Regional Community Colleges on June 28, 1977. He is also recipient of the 2008 APA International Humanitarian Award, Volunteer of the Year Lancaster Chapter 1992, Tiffany Award (First Tier) 2006, Special Achievement Award.

== Publications ==
Prewitt Díaz has published extensively over his career. By 1997 he had published over one hundred refereed journal articles on assessment, migration, mental health and education of Puerto Rican children in the United States and Puerto Rico. In the latter part of his career he has authored or co-authored 32 books addressing the psychosocial needs of disaster affected people in Central and South America as well as South Asia (American Psychologist, 2008).

The following are selected books over a twenty-year period:

- Prewitt Díaz, J.O., Laksminarayana, R, & Murthy, R.S. (Eds.). (2006). Advances in mental health and psychosocial support. New Delhi, India: Voluntary Health Association of India.
- Prewitt Díaz, J.O. (2006). Psychosocial support programs: From theory to a systematized approach. New Delhi, India: Voluntary Health Association of India.
- Prewitt Díaz, J.O., Laksminarayana, R, & Murthy, R.S. (Eds.). (2004). Disaster mental health in India. New Delhi: Voluntary Health Association of India. ISBN 81-89113-00-3
- Prewitt Díaz, J.O. (2002). Apoyo psicosocial en desastres: Un modelo para Guatemala. Ciudad de Guatemala: Cruz Roja Guatemalteca.
- Prewitt Díaz, J.O. (2001). Primeros auxilios psicológicos. El Salvador, San Salvador: Cruz Roja Salvadoreña & USAID.
- Prewitt Díaz, J.O. & Speck, M. (2000). Programa de preparación para desastres en Centro América. Tegucigalpa, Honduras: Cruz Roja Hondurena y la Federacion Internacional de la Cruz Roja y la Media Luna Roja.
- Prewitt Díaz, J.O. & Saballos Ramírez, M. (2000) Salud psicosocial en un desastre complejo: El effecto del huracán Mitch en Nicaragua. Managua, Nicaragua: La Universidad para la Paz (Naciones Unidas).
- Prewitt Díaz, J.O. (1995). The psychology of Puerto Rican migration. Chester, PA: Linder Press.

He was the primary author (with Dr. Robert Trotter III and Victor Rivera) of a three-year study titled "The effects of migration on children. An ethnographic study". The study documents for the first time the existence of the "culture of migrancy" and its effects on children and their schooling. As a result of the unveiling of this study Pennsylvania served as a host to the first public hearings of the National Commission on Migrant Education chaired by attorney Linda Chavez on August 7, 1990 in Gettysburg, Pennsylvania.

== Newspaper testimonials ==
- Acevedo, M. (24 June 1990). Campus Life: Penn State Bilingual teachers air for posts as principals. The New York Times. New York. https://www.nytimes.com?1990/06/24/nyregion/campus-life-penn-state-bilingual-teachers-aim-for-posts-as-principals.html
- Alvarez Jaimes, Y. (March 13, 2011). Resistante a los desastres naturales: El sicologo humanitario Joseph Orlando Prewitt Díaz. "El Vocero". San Juan, Puerto Rico. http://www.vocero.com/category/corazon_boricua-es
- Mulero, L. (November 23, 2006). La cara amiga en la cruz del desastre. Vidas únicas—Joseph O. Prewitt Díaz. El Nuevo Día. San Juan, Puerto Rico. http://elnuevodia.com/
- Perez, I. (February 11, 2001) La búsqueda de la sanidad emocional después del sismo. El Diario de Hoy. San Salvador, República de El Salvador.http://www.elsalvador.com/noticias/2001/2/11/NACIONAL/nacio1.html
- Gibb, T. (September 15, 2001). "he heroes plane": Memories of brave passengers evoke grief and praise. Pittsburgh Post Gazette. http://www.post-gassette.com/headlines/20010915counsel0915p.4.asp.
- No author. (April 12, 1998). Doctor aides Red Cross in Mississippi. Sunday News. Lancaster, Pennsylvania. Accessed May 27, 2007.
- Figueroa-Turpack, M. (July 24, 1996). Hispanic Professor is recognized at Alvernia. La Voz Hispana. P.4. Lancaster, Pennsylvania.
- No author. (July 23, 1996). He listens so Flight 800 can heal. Lancaster New Era. Lancaster, Pennsylvania. Accessed May 27, 2007.
- No author. (July 19, 1996). Psychological first aid for TWA victims'families. Lancaster New Era. Lancaster, Pennsylvania. Accessed May 27, 2007.
- Hoffner, G.A. (April 26, 1995). Answering the call at bomb site area psychologist will counsel victims and rescue workers. Philadelphia Inquirer.
- Alexander, L. (April 23, 1993). 'Disaster Joe' available in times of need. Intelligencer Journal. Profile in the Lifestyle Section for the National Volunteer Week.
- Schmidt, P. (November 29, 1989). Researchers Propose National Curriculum To Ease Barriers Faced by Migrant Students. Education Week. Washington, D.C.
- Márquez, N. (May 9, 1975). Loa a un Jibaro. Estampas Típicas: Joseph O. Prewitt Díaz. La Prensa Grafica. Hartford, Connecticut.

== See also ==
- List of Puerto Ricans
- Puerto Rican scientists and inventors
- American Red Cross

== Notes ==
1. "International humanitarian award: Joseph Orlando Prewitt Díaz". American Psychologist: 818–820. November 2008.
2. nps.gov
3. www.upr.clu.edu/exegesis/33/garciaLeduc.html
4. http://home.coqui.net/fundesco/_pages/historial.htm
5. "Latino Leaders will be honored by Gov. Ridge". (Lancaster. PA, April 5, 1999)
6. Trustees appointed to the Board for Regional Community Colleges (Hartford Courant, June 29, 1977).
7. Jaquemet, Iolanda. "Psychological support: luxury or necessity?". Red Cross Red Crescent. Retrieved October 28, 2010.
8. Personal Conversation with Mr. Israel Zuniga, Regional Director Central America Regional Delegation, American Red Cross, July 28, 2010.
9. Bulletin of the World Health Organization 85 (11): 822. November 2007.
10. Jacobs, G. (2007). The development and maturation of humanitarian psychology. American Psychologist, 62, 929–941.
11. American Red Cross (2009). Tsunami Recovery Program: Five-year report. Washington, DC: American Red Cross. Retrieved November 4, 2010.
12. IFRC (2009). Tsunami Five-Year Progress Report 2004–2009. Geneva, Switzerland: IFRC. Retrieved November 4, 2010
13. Rivera, M. (1997). An annotated bibliography of published materials on Puerto Ricans. Working Paper # 30. East Lansing, MI: Julian Samora Research Institute, Michigan State University.
