= Terry R. Parke =

American politician (born 1944)

Terry R. Parke (born February 21, 1944, in Pittsfield, Illinois)

Parke was born in Pittsfield, Illinois. He served in the United States Army. Parke graduated from Southern Illinois University with a bachelor's degree in education. Parke was an insurance agent. Parke served as a Republican member of the Illinois House of Representatives representing the 44th district, where he served for 22 years from 1985 to 2007. On November 7, 2006, Parke lost his reelection bid to Democrat Fred Crespo. Parke previously served as Schaumburg Township Trustee from 1981 to 1984, and Schaumburg Township School Trustee from 1979 to 1981. As a member of the Illinois House of Representatives, Parke served on seven committees: Insurance, Consumer Protection, Environment and Energy, Labor, Telecommunications, Environmental Health, and Commission on Governmental Forecasting and Accountability.
