= Benjamin Harrison School =

Public school in Cayey, Puerto Rico

Coordinates: 18.114167°N 66.169587°W

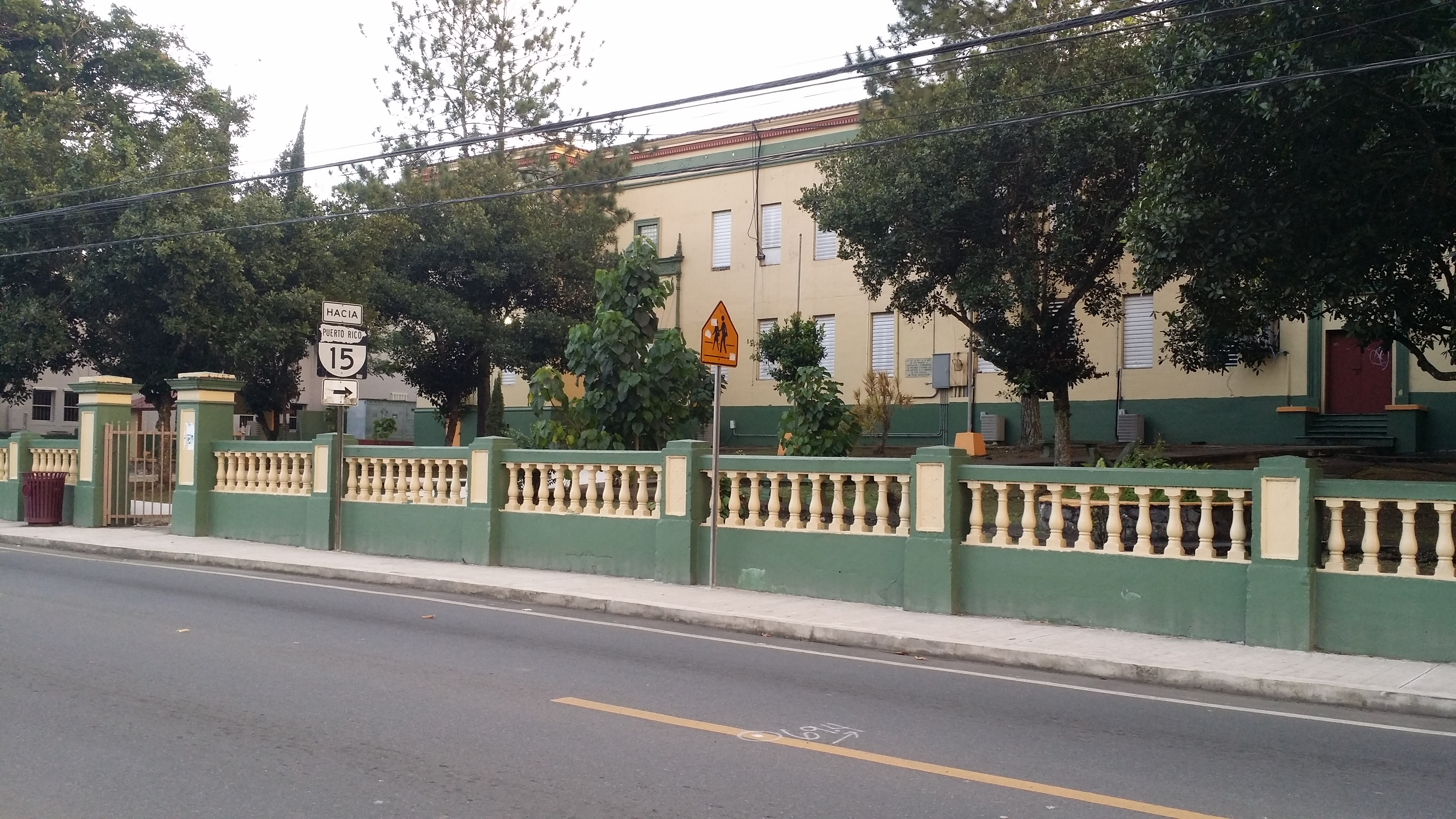
Benjamin Harrison School

The Benjamin Harrison School in Cayey is a school in the Puerto Rico public school system.

== Location ==
Now named Benjamin Harrison Vocational School, it is located on PR-14, José de Diego Avenue in Cayey.

== History ==
After the occupation of the United States in Puerto Rico and identifying illiteracy as one of the main problems in the island, the government developed a program for the construction of schools among other projects.

The Benjamin Harrison School was finished by October 23, 1902, with a total cost of $8,600.00 invested in its construction ($315,300 2024 dollars).

== Architecture ==
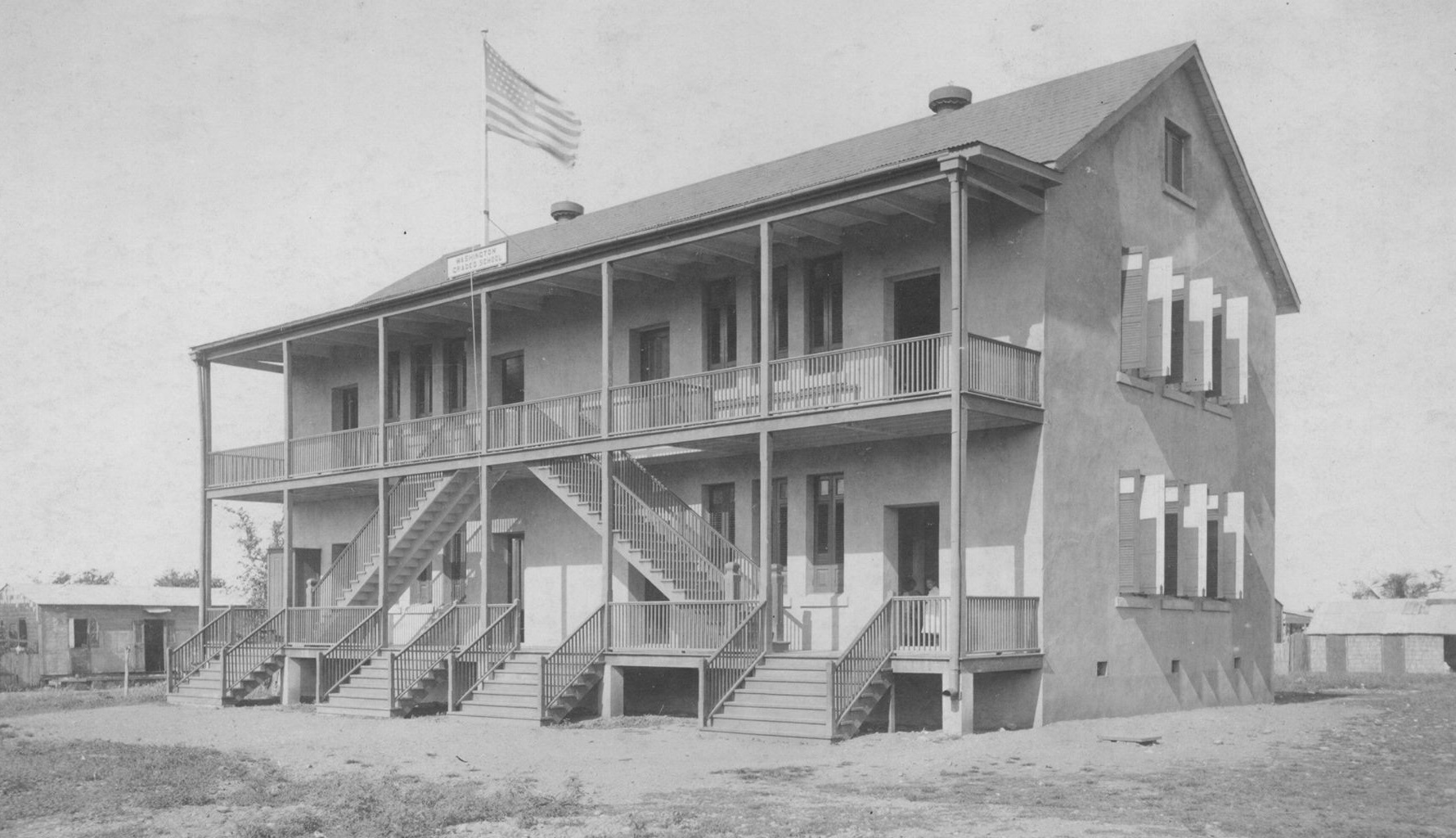
Benjamin Harrison School had a similar architecture to Washington's Graduate School in Guayama, Puerto Rico.

The original design of the school was a two-floor building in a rectangular shape with a gabled roof, similar to Washington's Graduate School from Guayama.

It had four classrooms, a basement, and an attic. The attic was built in order to get the best of the space beneath the gabled roof. In the front, it had two stairways providing an enormous balcony connecting two upstairs classrooms. The first floor had a carcade (corridor) or a hallway that connected the front yard through four stairways. The school had an enormous backyard and its sanitary facilities were a latrine.

== Notable alumni ==
- Gloria E. Baquero Lleras
- Danny Ortiz (baseball)
- José Ortiz (basketball)
- Rolando Ortiz Velázquez
- Miguel Pereira Castillo
- Joseph O. Prewitt Díaz
