= Andrew Bellatti =

American baseball player (born 1991)

- Pitcher
- Born: August 5, 1991 (age 35); San Diego, California, U.S.
- Batted: Right Threw: Right

MLB debut
- May 9, 2015, for the Tampa Bay Rays

Last MLB appearance
- September 11, 2023, for the Philadelphia Phillies

MLB statistics
- Win–loss record: 8–5
- Earned run average: 3.83
- Strikeouts: 125
- Stats at Baseball Reference

Teams
- Tampa Bay Rays (2015); Miami Marlins (2021); Philadelphia Phillies (2022–2023)

Andrew James Bellatti (born August 5, 1991) is an American former professional baseball pitcher. He played in Major League Baseball (MLB) for the Tampa Bay Rays, Miami Marlins, and Philadelphia Phillies. Bellatti was drafted by the Rays in the 12th round of the 2009 MLB draft, and made his MLB debut in 2015.

== Career ==
=== Tampa Bay Rays ===
Bellatti was drafted by the Tampa Bay Rays in the 12th round, 379th overall, of the 2009 Major League Baseball draft out of Steele Canyon High School in Spring Valley, California. He made his professional debut with the GCL Rays, and played for the rookie ball Princeton Rays in 2010. In November 2010 he was sentenced to jail for a fatal car crash that he was involved with in January 2010. He had collided head on with an oncoming driver after illegally crossing a double-yellow line and speeding, killing the other driver and injuring the driver's passenger and the passenger in the car with Bellatti. He had been sentenced to eight months, but was released after less than 90 days due to a plea agreement and time served. After he was released from jail he returned to the pitching in the Rays organization.

In 2011, Bellatti played for the Low-A Hudson Valley Renegades, pitching to a 3–5 record and 2.63 ERA in 15 games. In 2012, he played for the Single-A Bowling Green Hot Rods, recording a 7–3 record and 2.97 ERA with 99 strikeouts 91.0 innings of work. The next year, he split the year between the Single-A Charlotte Stone Crabs and the Double-A Montgomery Biscuits, posting a 7–4 record and 4.30 ERA between the two clubs. In 2014, he spent the season in Montgomery, registering a 2–6 record and 3.68 ERA in 46 appearances. He was assigned to the Triple-A Durham Bulls to begin the 2015 season.

Bellatti was called up to the majors for the first time on May 9, 2015. He made his MLB debut the same day, earning the win after pitching 3 1/3 scoreless innings against the Texas Rangers. He finished his rookie season with a 2.31 ERA in 17 appearances.

Bellatti began the 2016 season with Durham, and was designated for assignment on June 24, 2016. He cleared waivers and was sent outright to Durham on July 4. Bellatti made 13 appearances split between Durham, Montgomery, and Charlotte, registering a cumulative 0–3 record and 6.91 ERA with 21 strikeouts across 14 1/3 innings pitched. He elected free agency following the season on November 7.

=== Baltimore Orioles ===
On March 14, 2017, Bellatti signed a minor league deal with the Baltimore Orioles. He was assigned to the High-A Aberdeen IronBirds but did not play in a game due to injury. He elected free agency following the season on November 6.

=== Sugar Land Skeeters ===
On April 15, 2019, Bellatti signed with the Sugar Land Skeeters of the Atlantic League of Professional Baseball. He pitched a scoreless inning for the club in his only appearance.

=== New York Yankees ===
On April 29, 2019, Bellatti's contract was purchased by the New York Yankees. Bellatti split time between the High-A Tampa Tarpons and the Double-A Trenton Thunder, accumulating a 3–0 record and 5.50 ERA in 25 appearances between the two teams. He was released by the Yankees on August 23, 2019.

=== Sugar Land Skeeters (second stint) ===
On February 26, 2020, Bellatti signed with the Sugar Land Skeeters of the Atlantic League of Professional Baseball. However, Bellatti did not play in a game for the team due to the cancellation of the ALPB season because of the COVID-19 pandemic. He became a free agent after the year.

=== Miami Marlins ===
On March 2, 2021, Bellati signed with the Tri-City ValleyCats of the Frontier League. However, on May 28, Bellatti signed a minor league contract with the Miami Marlins organization. He was assigned to the Double-A Pensacola Blue Wahoos and later received a promotion to the Triple-A Jacksonville Jumbo Shrimp, posting a 2.03 ERA in 12 appearances between the two teams. On July 19, Bellatti was selected to the active roster. That day, he made his first MLB appearance since 2015, but allowed 5 earned runs in an inning and a third against the Washington Nationals. Bellatti was designated for assignment by Miami on July 23 after struggling to a 19.29 ERA in 2 appearances. Bellatti was sent outright to Triple-A Jacksonville on July 26. Bellatti was selected to the 40-man roster on October 1. Bellatti elected free agency on October 21.

=== Philadelphia Phillies ===
On November 19, 2021, Bellatti signed a minor league contract with the Philadelphia Phillies. On April 14, 2022, he had his contract purchased from the Triple-A Lehigh Valley IronPigs. In the 2022 regular season with the Phillies, he was 4–4 with two saves and a 3.31 ERA in 59 games (one start) over 54.1 innings with 78 strikeouts.

In 2023, Bellatti pitched in 27 games for the Phillies, registering a 5.11 ERA with 25 strikeouts across 24 2/3 innings of work. He was designated for assignment by the Phillies on February 6, 2024. Bellatti cleared waivers and was sent outright to Triple–A on February 11. In 46 relief outings for Lehigh, he compiled a 4–2 record and 5.48 ERA with 42 strikeouts and 2 saves across 42 2/3 innings pitched. Bellatti elected free agency on October 10.

=== San Diego Padres ===
On March 10, 2025, Bellatti signed a minor league contract with the San Diego Padres. In five appearances for the Triple-A El Paso Chihuahuas, he struggled to an 11.57 ERA with five strikeouts across 4 2/3 innings pitched. Bellatti was released by the Padres organization on May 7.

=== Toros de Tijuana ===
On May 16, 2025, Bellatti signed with the Toros de Tijuana of the Mexican League. In four appearances for Tijuana, Bellatti struggled to a 6.75 ERA with one strikeout over 2 2/3 innings pitched.

=== Bravos de León ===
On May 29, 2025, Bellatti, Danny Ortiz, and Phillips Valdéz were traded to the Bravos de León in exchange for Aderlin Rodríguez. In 14 appearances for León, he struggled to an 0-1 record and 7.59 ERA with six strikeouts across 10 2/3 innings pitched. Bellatti was released by the Bravos on July 10.

=== Cleburne Railroaders ===
On April 1, 2026, Bellatti signed with the Cleburne Railroaders of the American Association of Professional Baseball. In three starts for Cleburne, he posted a 1–1 record with a 1.80 ERA and 15 strikeouts across 10 innings pitched. On May 28, Bellatti was released by the Railroaders.

On June 12, 2026, Bellatti announced his retirement from professional baseball, citing an ulnar collateral ligament tear suffered during his time with Cleburne.

== Personal life ==
Bellatti is not of Italian descent. The name comes from his paternal grandfather who was adopted by a stepfather of Italian descent. He is married to Kylee.
