= Phillips Valdéz =

Dominican baseball player (born 1991)

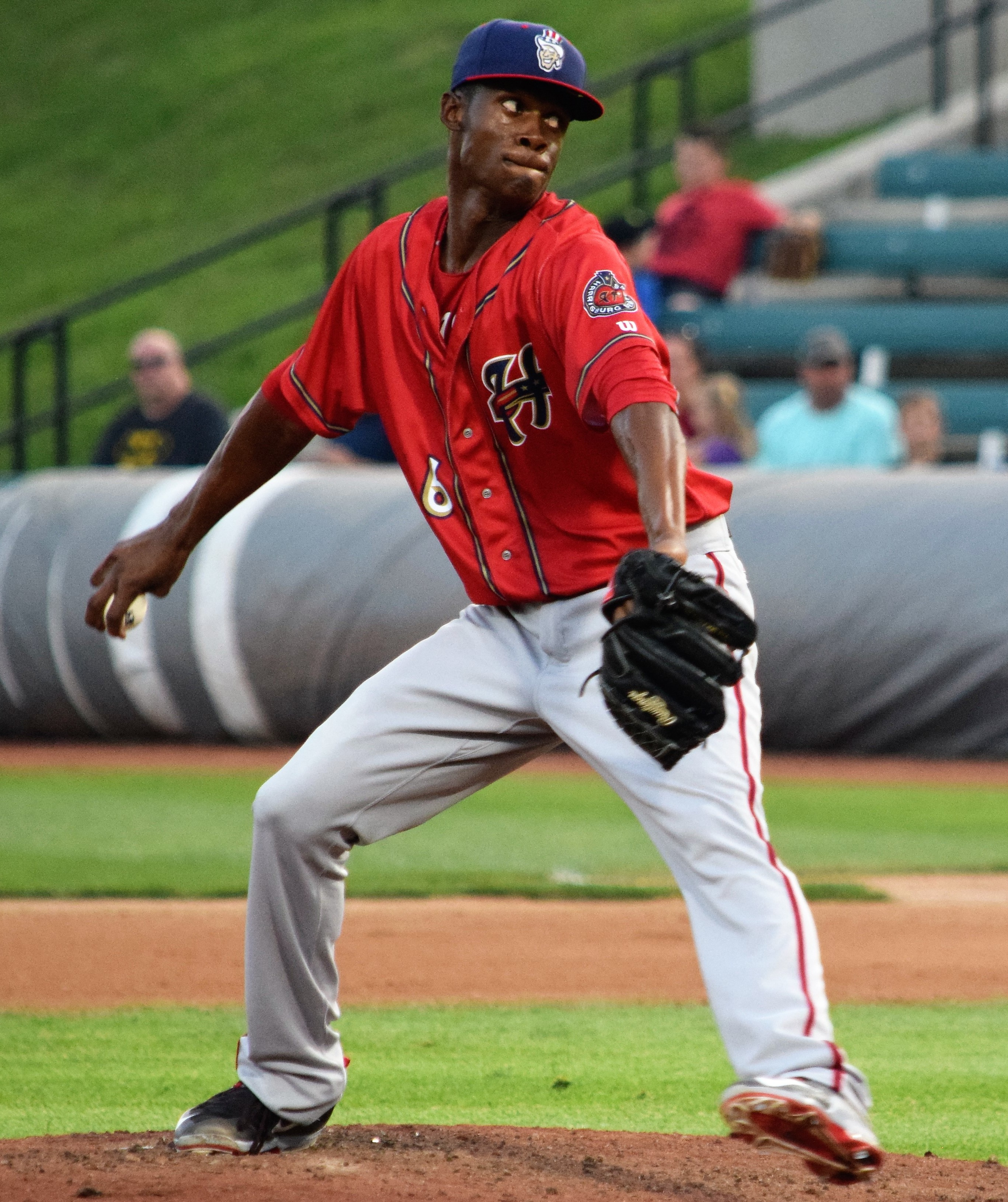
- Valdéz with the Harrisburg Senators in 2017

Bravos de León – No. 71
- Pitcher
- Born: November 16, 1991 (age 34); San Pedro de Macorís, Dominican Republic
- Bats: Right Throws: Right

MLB debut
- June 8, 2019, for the Texas Rangers

MLB statistics (through 2022 season)
- Win–loss record: 3–2
- Earned run average: 4.56
- Strikeouts: 96
- Stats at Baseball Reference

Teams
- Texas Rangers (2019); Boston Red Sox (2020–2022)

Phillips Chalier Valdéz (born November 16, 1991) is a Dominican professional baseball pitcher for the Bravos de León of the Mexican League. He has previously played in Major League Baseball (MLB) for the Texas Rangers and Boston Red Sox.

== Career ==
=== Cleveland Indians ===
Valdéz signed as an international free agent with the Cleveland Indians on May 29, 2009. He played for the Dominican Summer League Indians in 2009 and 2010. On November 10, 2010, he was released by Cleveland.

=== Washington Nationals ===
On December 16, 2010, he signed a minor league contract with the Tampa Bay Rays, but was released on May 1, 2011, and did not appear in a professional game in 2011. Valdéz trained at a Japanese baseball academy in the Dominican that year after being released. On May 30, 2012, he signed a minor league contract with the Washington Nationals. From 2012 through the 2018 season, he played in the Washington organization. During his time with them, he played for the DSL Nationals, Gulf Coast Nationals, Auburn Doubledays, Hagerstown Suns, Potomac Nationals, Harrisburg Senators, and the Syracuse Chiefs.

In 2018, Valdéz made 31 appearances split between Double–A Harrisburg and Triple–A Syracuse, compiling a 6–7 record and 2.73 ERA with 104 strikeouts across 135 innings pitched. He elected free agency following the season on November 2, 2018.

=== Texas Rangers ===
On December 21, 2018, Valdéz signed a minor league contract with the Texas Rangers. He was assigned to the Nashville Sounds to open the 2019 season. With Nashville in 2019, he went 1–7 with a 4.92 ERA over 78 2/3 innings.

On June 8, Valdéz had his contract selected and he was called up to the major leagues for the first time, as the 26th man of a doubleheader versus the Oakland Athletics. He made his debut that afternoon, throwing two scoreless innings in relief. With Texas in 2019, Valdéz went 0–0 with a 3.94 ERA and 18 strikeouts over 16 innings. On November 1, 2019, Valdéz was claimed off waivers by the Seattle Mariners.

=== Boston Red Sox ===
On February 23, 2020, Valdéz was claimed off waivers by the Boston Red Sox. He was optioned to the Triple-A Pawtucket Red Sox on March 8. On July 24, Valdéz made his Red Sox debut in the opening game of the delayed-start 2020 season, pitching two scoreless innings of relief in a 13–2 win over the Baltimore Orioles. On August 25, Valdéz pitched 1 2/3 scoreless innings to pick up his first MLB win in a 9–7 victory over the Toronto Blue Jays. Overall with the 2020 Red Sox, Valdéz appeared in 24 games, all in relief, compiling a 1–1 record with 3.26 ERA and 30 strikeouts in 30 1/3 innings pitched.

Valdéz began the 2021 season as a member of Boston's bullpen. On June 6, he recorded his first major league save, coming in extra-innings away game against the New York Yankees after closer Matt Barnes had a blown save in the bottom of the ninth. Valdéz was optioned to the Triple-A Worcester Red Sox on June 10, after pitching three times in four days. He was recalled to Boston on July 23, returned to Worcester on August 12, and again recalled to Boston on August 30. On September 12, Valdéz was placed on the COVID-related list. Overall during the regular season, Valdéz made 28 relief appearances for Boston, pitching to a 2–0 record with 5.85 ERA while striking out 35 batters in 40 innings.

Valdéz began the 2022 season as a member of Boston's bullpen, until being optioned to Worcester on May 2 as MLB rosters contracted from 28 to 26 players. He subsequently split time between Worcester and Boston, being recalled and optioned multiple times. Valdéz was designated for assignment on July 26. In 13 relief appearances with Boston during 2022, he posted a 4.41 ERA and 0–1 record while striking out 13 batters in 16 1/3 innings.

=== Seattle Mariners ===
On July 29, 2022, Valdéz was claimed off waivers by the Seattle Mariners and was optioned to the Triple-A Tacoma Rainiers. In 18 appearances for Tacoma, he logged a 4.22 ERA with 16 strikeouts in 21 1/3 innings of work. On September 30, Valdez was designated for assignment following the promotion of Brian O'Keefe. He cleared waivers and was sent outright to Triple–A Tacoma on October 3. Valdez elected free agency following the season on November 10.

=== Colorado Rockies ===
On December 15, 2022, Valdéz signed a minor league contract with the Colorado Rockies. In 22 games (15 starts) for the Triple–A Albuquerque Isotopes, he registered a 5–7 record and 8.15 ERA with 49 strikeouts in 67 1/3 innings pitched. On August 15, 2023, Valdéz was released by the Rockies organization.

=== Toros de Tijuana ===
On April 17, 2024, Valdéz signed with the Toros de Tijuana of the Mexican League. In 2 starts for Tijuana, Valdéz logged a 3.72 ERA with 5 strikeouts across 9 2/3 innings pitched.

=== El Águila de Veracruz ===
On April 27, 2024, Valdéz was traded to the El Águila de Veracruz of the Mexican League. In 14 starts for Veracruz, he logged a 6–5 record and 4.68 ERA with 30 strikeouts across 67 1/3 innings pitched.

=== Toros de Tijuana (second stint) ===
On September 20, 2024, Valdéz was traded back to the Toros de Tijuana of the Mexican League. Valdéz made nine appearances (two starts) for Tijuana in 2025, posting a 1–0 record and 3.60 ERA with 12 strikeouts over 15 innings of work.

=== Bravos de León ===
On May 29, 2025, Valdéz, Danny Ortiz, and Andrew Bellatti were traded to the Bravos de León in exchange for Aderlin Rodríguez. He did not appear in a game for León.

== Personal life ==
Valdez has a daughter who was born in August 2022 in Boston. Previously, he married Samantha Gross in Las Vegas, Nevada, July 10, 2017. During 2019 spring training, Valdéz's younger brother Mario died after suffering a heart attack at the age of 18.
