= Center for Victims of Torture =

US-based non-profit organization

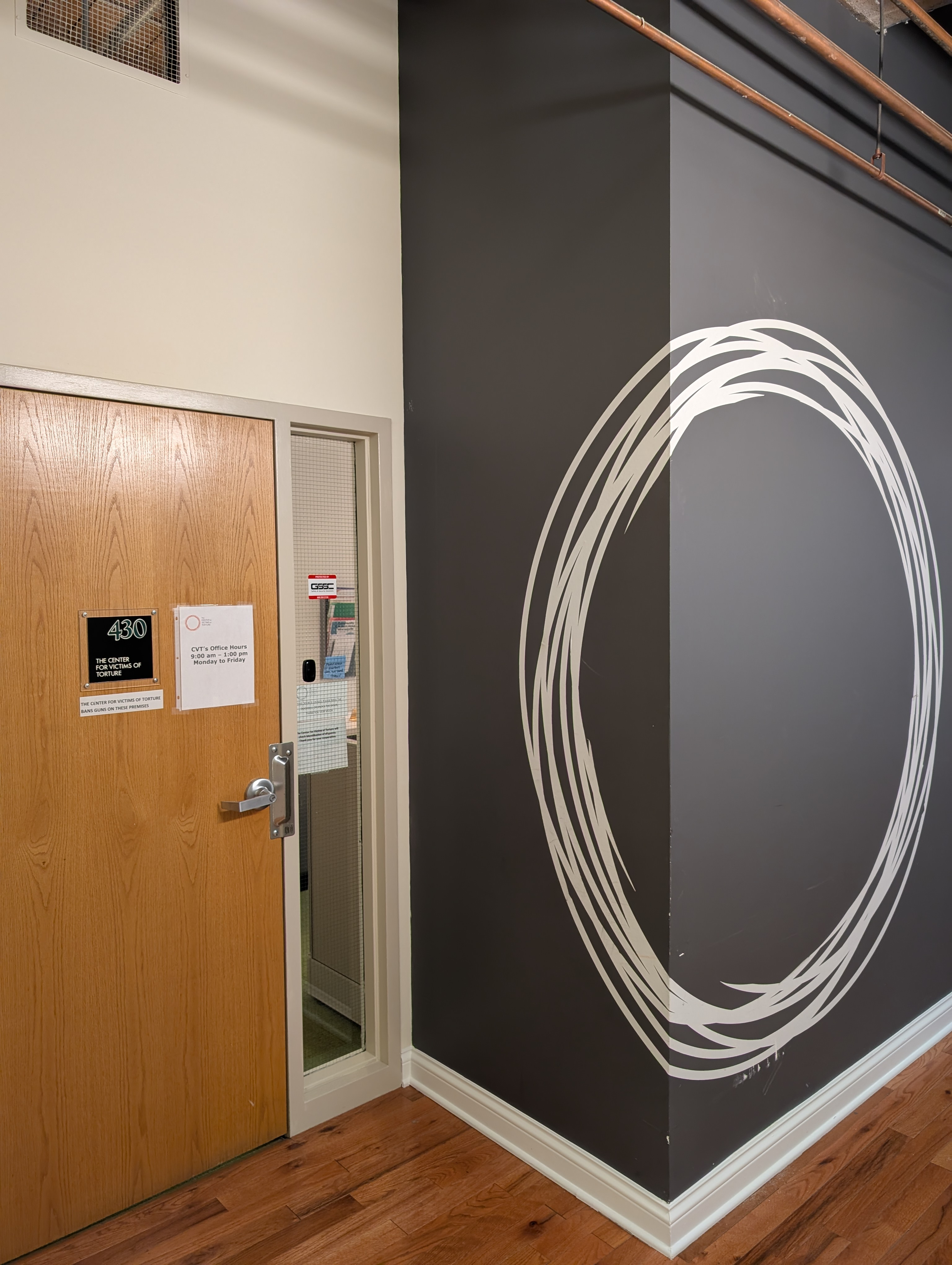
- Center for Victims of Torture
- Founded: 1985
- Purpose: Healing, Training, Research, and Advocacy
- Location: Saint Paul, Minnesota
- Region served: Global
- Leader: Dr. Simon Adams
- Website: cvt.org

The Center for Victims of Torture (CVT) is an international non-profit headquartered in Saint Paul, Minnesota, that provides direct care for those who have been tortured, trains partner organizations in the United States and around the world who can prevent and treat torture, conducts research to understand how best to heal survivors, and advocates for an end to torture.

CVT's mission is to heal the wounds of torture on individuals, their families and their communities, and to end torture worldwide and it has won the APA International Humanitarian Award from the American Psychological Association

Since its founding in 1985, CVT has:

- Rehabilitated over 30,000 survivors through direct healing.
- Engaged in post-conflict community building after some of the world's deadliest wars, working in Guinea, Sierra Leone, Liberia, Democratic Republic of Congo, Jordan and Kenya.
- Pioneered research in torture survivor rehabilitation to better understand the effects of torture and how best to heal survivors.
- Led efforts to end the practice of torture by the US government, including President Obama's executive order banning torture and cruel treatment.

CVT provides care for survivors at its healing center in St. Paul, Minnesota, and at projects in Jordan, the Dadaab refugee camps in Kenya, Nairobi, Kenya, Uganda and in northern Ethiopia working with Eritrean refugees. It has an office in Washington, D.C.

The Center for Victims of Torture is a 501(c)(3) organization that is recognized by the Charities Review Council, the American Institute of Philanthropy, and Charity Navigator for its well-managed use of donations.

== History ==
CVT was founded as a result of actions by Minnesota Governor Rudy Perpich. Gov. Perpich directed a committee of human rights experts to research various initiatives to support human rights in Minnesota. The most ambitious proposal from this group was a rehabilitation center for survivors of torture. Governor Perpich embraced the idea. He appointed a task force which traveled to Copenhagen, Denmark, to visit the first treatment center in the world, the Rehabilitation Center for Torture Victims (today known as DIGNITY - Danish Institute Against Torture). The task force recommended that such a center be established in Minnesota.

=== A Home for Healing ===
CVT was founded in 1985 as an independent, nongovernmental organization. For the first two years care was provided at the International Clinic of St. Paul Ramsey Medical Center. In 1987, CVT moved to a more home-like, less institutional setting that would feel welcoming to survivors. Today, CVT provides care from the St. Paul Healing Center. The house was designed to meet the needs of torture survivors, with domestic furnishings, large windows and rooms with rounded or angled corners to create an environment much different from the stark, square rooms with glaring lights that most torture survivors experienced.

=== Expanding Healing Services ===
CVT's international work began in Bosnia and Croatia in 1993. During the war, CVT psychotherapists traveled to the region to train care providers in the specialized treatment of torture survivors. In 1995, CVT began working with centers in Turkey to strengthen the skills of medical professionals and nongovernmental organizations that work with survivors.

In 1999, CVT launched its first international direct healing program working with Sierra Leonean refugees in Guinea, West Africa. They provided direct mental health counseling to refugees who were suffering from torture and trauma due to the multiple conflicts in the region. CVT psychotherapists also trained residents of the refugee camps as paraprofessional psychosocial peer counselors – peer mental health counselors – who continue to support a local mental health network after the program finished in 2005.

=== Supporting Rehabilitation Services for Survivors ===
CVT has launched a number of training initiatives to build more resources for appropriate and sensitive care of torture survivors. CVT provides training and technical assistance to torture survivor rehabilitation centers in the United States through a program called the National Capacity-Building project (NCB) and abroad through its project Partners in Trauma Healing (PATH). Training initiatives are designed to build a network of healing professionals where few exist, and for those who participate in a CVT training project to continue providing healing services long after CVT leaves a country.

=== Advocating for Survivors ===
CVT established a presence in Washington, D.C., in 1992, with a volunteer representing CVT. At the time, CVT learned that the United States was withholding funds pledged to the United Nations Voluntary Fund for Victims of Torture, an agency that provides financial support to torture survivor rehabilitation centers worldwide. CVT worked with faith-based groups and the human rights community to secure the release of nearly $400,000 – at the time, the largest contribution in the history of the UN Fund.

Since then, CVT continued to cultivate bipartisan support for healing survivors of torture. The Torture Victims Relief Act, originating with former Senator Dave Durenberger (R-MN), authorizes federal support for torture survivor rehabilitation programs in the U.S. and abroad. As a result of TVRA, since 2000 the United States has been the world's largest donor to torture survivor rehabilitation.

In 1998 CVT organized domestic centers into the National Consortium of Torture Treatment Programs and provides training on advocacy and building constituency.

In addition to seeking financial support for torture rehabilitation, CVT collaborated with the National Religious Campaign Against Torture and Evangelicals for Human Rights to advocate against the use of torture by the U.S. government since September 11, 2001.

In 2021, CVT supported the Bivens bill in the United States House of Representatives that allows citizens to recover damages for constitutional violations committed against them by federal law enforcement officials, including U.S. Immigration and Customs Enforcement's (ICE), Transportation Security Administration (TSA), Federal Bureau of Investigation (FBI), Department of Justice (DOJ) and federal prison officials.

=== Torture Survivor Rehabilitation ===
==== International Healing Services ====
CVT provides direct care to torture survivors in areas of the world where few mental health resources are available. Working in refugee camps and areas where conflict has devastated entire communities, CVT trains local community members to meet the mental health needs in their communities for the long term.

==== Healing Survivors of Torture and War ====
CVT provides counseling and community mental health activities to adults and children who suffered torture and war trauma. Most survivors receive small group counseling. These small groups meet weekly for about ten weeks, and, depending on the nature of the trauma, might be divided into different populations including adults, children, men and women, girls and boys.

Survivors with severe trauma symptoms receive private individual counseling, with many joining small group counseling when they are able. CVT international healing projects help an average of 1,600 torture and war trauma survivors each year.

Survivors receiving care from CVT are followed closely to measure their healing. CVT research consistently report significant decreases in mental health symptoms such as anxiety and depression, as well as decreases in somatic (physical) symptoms. Survivors also express more hope for the future and better relationships after receiving help from CVT.

==== Training Peer Counselors ====
In addition to providing direct mental health services, CVT trains members of the community and the refugee population to be skilled group counselors, advocates, educators and trainers. The goal is to develop mental health resources where none existed before. These paraprofessional mental health counselors undergo an intensive orientation and basic training period. Then they participate in small group counseling sessions with a professional psychotherapist experienced in torture and trauma recovery. Throughout their work with CVT, they receive ongoing professional training and daily mentoring with a professional psychotherapist modeling, observing and giving feedback after every counseling session and activity.

Former counselors trained by CVT have been hired by the International Criminal Court, the Special Court for Sierra Leone and other organizations where extensive mental health expertise is required.

==== Community Awareness ====
CVT conducts training and awareness-raising activities in the local communities, including teachers, religious and local leaders to help them understand the effects of torture on individuals and communities. CVT initiates non-counseling activities such as sports, games, drama, art and play therapy to engage the whole community in the healing process and reach out to survivors who could benefit from CVT services. Every year, thousands of community members learn of CVT through these activities.

==== Culturally Sensitive Care ====
A hallmark of CVT's international healing services is the combination of contemporary Western psychotherapy approaches with culturally appropriate methods of healing. This approach was adopted in its first international healing initiative in Guinea, where CVT psychotherapists and the peer counselors included ritual, storytelling and song in the healing process. That practice continues by adapting counseling to incorporate culturally appropriate traditions, concepts and customs into the healing process. The psychotherapists are highly skilled trauma therapists who have worked in culturally diverse environments.

CVT international healing projects are funded by the State Department Bureau of Population, Refugees and Migration, the European Union, the United Nations Voluntary Fund for Victims of Torture, and USAID and the American people.

=== Minnesota Healing Services ===
In Minnesota all healing services are provided on an outpatient basis at CVT's St. Paul Healing Center. The center is located in a renovated Victorian home to create a comfortable and welcoming environment.

Each survivor works with a team of specialists who provide:

- Medical treatment, including psychiatric services and referrals to specialists as needed
- Nursing care to help monitor physical conditions and facilitate referrals to specialists
- Psychotherapy with a psychologist, marriage and family therapist or clinical social worker
- Social services to connect survivors with other organizations and basic needs, and to provide case management to reduce the need for more intensive interventions such as hospitalization
- Massage, occupational and physical therapies to increase mobility and relieve physical pain

For survivors who don't speak English, interpreters play an integral role in the healing process.

=== Stages of healing ===
Torture is an attack on all aspects of a person's life. Its effects reach beyond the individual to the family and the community. As part of the holistic healing approach, survivors in Minnesota receive individual and group counseling. The counseling addresses individual situations while helping survivors learn how to trust and rebuild relationships for a more fulfilling life. CVT's healing teams guide survivors through three stages of healing:

- Safety and Stabilization: re-establishing health and trust; discussing legal resources and processes; ensuring clients have housing, clothing, food and medical care.
- Grief and Mourning: working through what happened.
- Reconnection: getting back to community and life purpose and developing and repairing relationships with friends and family.

Support Services: When a survivor is ready to reconnect with the community, volunteers provide important support services, such as teaching survivors how to read a bus schedule and navigate public transportation, tutoring survivors in English, accompanying survivors on visits to a museum, library, concert, coffee shop or grocery store.

=== Training ===
==== National Capacity Building Project ====
The National Capacity Building Project (NCB) focuses on building networks of rehabilitation centers and service providers, fostering knowledge-sharing and relationship-building among colleagues in the field, and providing expert professional training and technical assistance. Training for torture treatment professionals focuses on:

- Clinical skills and best practices
- Organizational development and fundraising
- Program management
- Data collection and program evaluation

==== HealTorture.org ====
HealTorture.org is a repository of information related to torture survivors and their treatment and healing. Through webinar trainings, professional journal articles and publications, bibliographies, treatment manuals, and other online resources, the site hosts information intended for psychologists, therapists, social workers, physicians and nurses, lawyers, and administrators. The website also serves as a portal to other centers and organizations that work with and support survivors of torture.

==== New Tactics in Human Rights ====
New Tactics in Human Rights Project is an education program providing resources relating strategies and tactics that can be used by people who seek to advance human rights. These resources have been used by activists in panel discussions, by over 60 local groups for both technical and financial help and for training programs.

New Tactics is a project of the Center for Victims of Torture started in 1999. New Tactics identifies its efforts as focused on three areas: "creating and sharing information and materials", "training and mentoring" and "building an online community".

Resources are organized around analysis of potential solutions rather than that of specific issues, geographic regions or target groups that allow activists to clearly recognize the unique elements of their situation, and to seek approaches that have worked elsewhere and apply them to new regions or issues. This technique may also improve activists’ ability to combine diverse tactics into complex strategies.

===== Methods =====
In person training such as regional workshops in which activists train each other in tactics they have used and develop "tactical portfolios" of practical tools for applying new tactics. Seven workshops have been held, the most recent in Liberia in February 2007, focusing on post-conflict tactics for rebuilding civil society.

Publications including the book New Tactics in Human Rights: A Resource for Practitioners, which offers a conceptual framework for thinking strategically and tactically to promote human rights, and gives dozens of examples of innovative tactics, categorized by the strategic situation in which they were used. Other publications include the Tactical Notebook Series (Liam Mahoney, series editor) created by participants from the regional cross-training workshops, that provide first-person, detailed information on the use of a tactic and how it may be adapted to other situations.

New Tactics developed "Tactical Mapping" a methodology to help identify the relationships surrounding a human rights abuse, and the points in which the system can be interrupted or transformed, ranging from highly local, personal relationships (e.g., the perpetrator's professional associations) to international institutions (e.g., the United Nations). It allows a coalition of advocates to see where each is working on the system, and where there are gaps that need to be addressed, either by creating new tactics or finding new allies.

Online presence, the New Tactics website has been recognized as a resource for human rights activists. The website provides access to a searchable database with 49 "Tactic Case Studies" and "over 190 specific and successfully implemented human rights tactics and peer-to-peer dialogs with human rights practitioners in more than 130 countries." The project's website also includes online discussion courses, tools for sharing and networking and a monthly discussion, named "Tactical Dialog", of a featured tactic (examples include: unarmed accompaniment; engaging the media; or using historical sites to spark discussion of current issues). New Tactics also publishes an e-newsletter highlighting specific tactics and information for inspiring innovation and the blog InterTactica by Philippe Duhamel.

==== PATH Project ====
Partners in Trauma Healing (PATH) creates a network of rehabilitation professionals who provide intellectual and emotional support for the difficult work of providing healing services to torture survivors. PATH works with ten centers focusing on three areas: mental health treatment and healing, monitoring and evaluation, and organizational development.
