= Vaquera =

Vaquera may refer to:

- Doma vaquera, horse riding technique
- Carlos Vaquera (born 1962), Spanish magician
- Vaquera (fashion brand), American fashion company
