= Andrés Baquero =

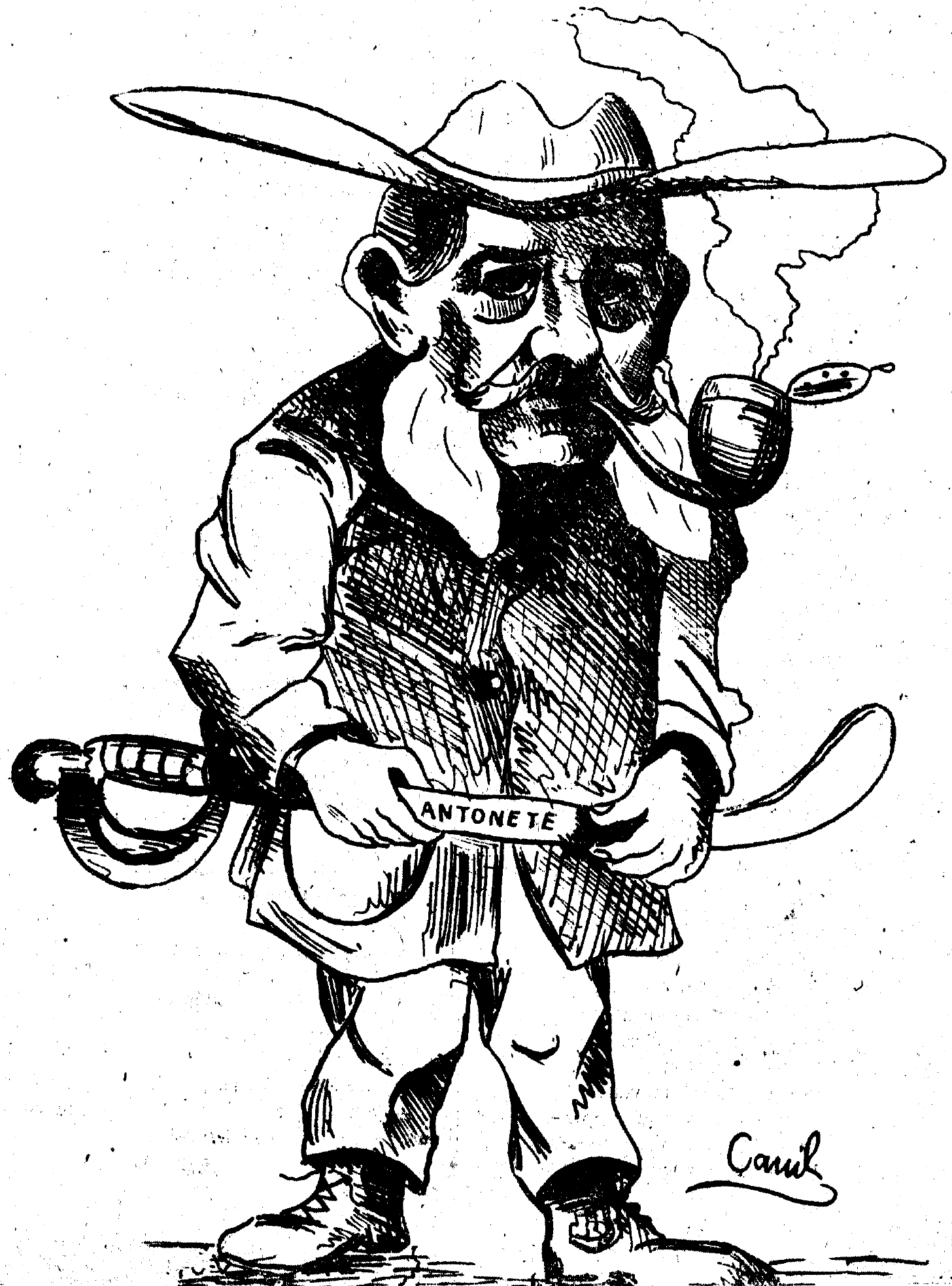
- Caricature of Andrés Baquero. In his hands he holds a sabre with the name "Antonete", due to a controversy of the time about the authenticity of the weapon that was then exposed in the Provincial Museum as belonging to the revolutionary Antonio Gálvez Arce.
- Born: 1853
- Died: January 1916 (aged 62–63)

Andrés Baquero (1853 – 7 January 1916) was a Spanish teacher, researcher and writer from Murcia.

== Works ==
- Study the history of literature in Murcia from Alfonso X to the Catholic Monarchs, London: Printed by T. Fortanet, 1877. OCLC 2928845
- Illustrious sons of the province of Albacete. Foreword by HE. Mr. Marques de Molins. Madrid: Perez Dubrull, 1884. OCLC 23476493
- Catalogue of Fine Arts faculty Murcia. Murcia, Successors Nogués, 1913. OCLC 3079290
- Gleanings and documents on the history of Cartagena, Cehegín, Mula and Murcia. OCLC 13056588
- The bridge of Murcia, Murcia Journal of 22 February 1882.
- The Virgin of the Fuensanta, patron of Murcia, Tip. Sánchez, 1927.
