= Malcolm MacLachlan =

Irish psychologist

Malcolm "Mac" MacLachlan is a Professor of Psychology and Social Inclusion at Maynooth University, Ireland.

He has published over twenty books and three hundred academic papers and chapters and delivered over 30 keynote presentations at international conferences and high-level meetings. His interests are in Social Inclusion, Disability, Assistive Technology, and Policy, Systems & Organisation Design. He also works in the areas of International Development, Humanitarian Work Psychology and Maritime Psychology.

He is the Director of the Assisting Living & Learning (ALL) Institute, a cross-disciplinary initiative with over 50 academics and researchers, established in 2017, at Maynooth University.

== Career ==
He is a clinical psychologist, Fellow of the Psychological Society of Ireland and of the British Psychological Society, and Member of the Royal Irish Academy; and has worked in Ireland and throughout Europe, Asia, Africa and South America. He is the Research and Innovation Lead for the World Health Organisation’s Global Cooperation on Assistive Technology (GATE) programme and the Knowledge Management Lead for the United Nations Partnership for the Rights of People with Disabilities (UNPRPD). He has worked extensively with civil society organisations and especially Disabled People’s Organisations (DPOs). He is a recipient of the American Psychological Association’s International Humanitarian Award, the British Psychological Society’s Award for Promoting Equality of Opportunity, and the Royal Irish Academy’s Gold Medal for Social Science.

Prof MacLachlan is also Extraordinary Professor of Rehabilitation at Stellenbosch University, South Africa and Visiting Professor at Palacky University Olomouc, Czech Republic. He previously held a Personal Chair as Professor of Global Health at Trinity College Dublin, and has been a visiting professor at Harvard University and the University of Malawi; where he was previously head of the Department of Psychology in the 1990s.

Professor MacLachlan has chaired a number of consensus meetings and summits, including:

- Chair of WHO Expert Consensus Meeting on the Development of Guidelines in Prosthetics and Orthotics (Bangkok, 2014)
- Chair of WHO Consensus Meeting for the development of the priority Assistive Products List (the assistive technology equivalent of the Essential Medicines List) (Geneva, 2016)
- Co-chair of the GREAT (Global Research, Innovation and Education on Assistive Technology)Summit, WHO Headquarters (Geneva, 2017 & 2019).

Prof MacLachlan has also led a number of consortia that have produced WHO Commissioned reports, including the report of the systematic review on potential benefits of accessible home environments for people with functional impairments for the WHO Housing & Health Guidelines, and two WHO Commissioned realist reviews related to disability and rehabilitation services globally.

Prof MacLachlan's work has impacted practice and policy and has been presented to leading decisions makers at the Global Ministerial Forum for Research on Health, to the OECD’s Development Advisory Committee, to the UN’s Commission on Social Development and to the African Union’s meeting of Social Welfare Ministers.

== Authored or co-authored books/monographs/manuals ==
- Huss, T. & MacLachlan, M. (2016) Equity and Inclusion in Policy Processes (EquIPP): A Framework to support Equity & Inclusion in the Process of Policy Development, Implementation and Evaluation. Dublin: Global Health Press.
- Mannan, H., Amin, M., Maclachlan, M. & The EquitAble Consortium (2014) (Second Edition) The EquiFrame Manual: An analytical tool for evaluating and facilitating the inclusion of core concepts of human rights and vulnerable groups in policy documents. Dublin: The Global Health Press & Lyon: Handicap International (English & French).
- Alisha Ali, Dharm Bhawuk; David L. Blustein, Boston, Stuart C. Carr, Alexander

Gloss, Johannes Haushofer, Ariel Kalil, Maureen E. Kenny, Saliha Kozan, Sebastian J. Lipina, Malcolm MacLachlan, Eilish McAuliffe, Jennifer Sheehy-Skeffington, Laura Smith, Lori Foster Thompson, Hirokazu Yoshikawa and Kathleen Ziol-Guest. (2014) Barriers and Opportunities at the Base of the Pyramid: The Role of the Private Sector in Inclusive Development. Istanbul: UNDP.

- MacLachlan, M. & Hand, K. (2013) Happy Nation? Prospects for Psychological Prosperity in Ireland. Dublin: Liffey Press
- Mannan, H., Amin, M., Maclachlan, M. & The EquitAble Consortium (2011 & 2014) The EquiFrame Manual: An analytical tool for evaluating and facilitating the inclusion of core concepts of human rights and vulnerable groups in policy documents'. Dublin: The Global Health Press & Lyon: Handicap International. For the Second French/English Edition see: http://www.hiproweb.org/uploads/tx_hidrtdocs/EquiFrameManual2014.pdf
- MacLachlan, M., Carr, S.C. and Mc Auliffe, E. (2010) The Aid Triangle: Recognizing the Human Dynamics of Dominance, Justice and Identity. Zed: London.
- MacLachlan, M. (2006) Culture & Health: A Critical Perspective towards Global Health (Second Edition). Chichester: Wiley.
- MacLachlan, M. (2004) Embodiment: Clinical, Critical & Cultural Perspectives on Health & Illness. Milton Keynes: Open University Press.
- Smyth, C., MacLachlan, M. and Clare, A. (2003) Cultivating Suicide? Destruction of Self in a Changing Ireland. Dublin: The Liffey Press.
- Carr, S.C., Mc Auliffe, E. and MacLachlan, M. (1998) Psychology of Aid. London: Routledge. [264 pages].
- Emerson, H., Galvin, T. and MacLachlan, M. (1998) International Development Expertise in Higher Education: A database for Ireland. Dublin: IHEI.

== Edited & C0-Edited books & journals ==
- Scherer, M. J. and MacLachlan, M. (2018) Special Issue on the First Global Research, Innovation, and Education on Assistive Technology (GREAT) Summit. Disability and Rehabilitation: Assistive Technology, 1-2. doi:10.1080/17483107.2018.1471170
- MacLachlan, M. (2017) Maritime Psychology: Research in Organizational & Health Behavior at Sea. New York: Springer.
- Ahmimed, C.; MacLachlan, M. & Mannan, H. (Eds.) (2014) Policies & Processes for Social Inclusion: Volume I: Possibilities from South East Asia. Jakarta: UNESCO.
- Carr, S.C., MacLachlan, M. & Furnham, A. (2012) Humanitarian Work Psychology. London: Palgrave-MacMillan.
- Carr, S.C., MacLachlan, M. and McWha, I. (2010) Are Development Discrepancies Undermining Performance? Special Issue of International Journal of Psychology, 45(5), 321-380.
- MacLachlan, M. & Swartz, L. (2009) Disability & International Development: Towards Inclusive Global Health. New York: Springer.
- MacLachlan, M., Mji, G., McLaren, P. & Gcaza, S. (2009, Volume 1) Realising the Rights of Persons with Disabilities in Africa. Special Issue of Disability & Rehabilitation, Issue 1, 2009.
- MacLachlan, M., Carr, S.C. and McWha, I. (2008) Interdisciplinary Research for Development. New Delhi: Global Development Network. (Available as an E-book at http://www.gdnet.org/middle.php?oid=1215).
- Gallagher, P., Desmond, D. and MacLachlan, M. (2008) Psychoprosthetics: The State of the Knowledge. London: Springer.
- Carr, S.C. and MacLachlan, M. (2005) Knowledge Flows and Capacity Development. Special Issue of Higher Education Policy. Paris: UNESCO/IAU/Palgrave. [199-325]
- MacLachlan, M. & Gallagher, P. (2004) Enabling Technologies: Body Image and Body Function. Edinburgh: Churchill Livingstone.
- MacLachlan, M. and Caball, M. (2004) Social Science in the Knowledge Society. Dublin: Liffey Press.
- MacLachlan, Malcolm; Smyth, Caroline (2004). Binge Drinking and Youth Culture: Alternative Perspectives. Dublin: Liffey Press. ISBN 978-1-904148-42-5.
- MacLachlan, M. (2001) Cultivating Health: Cultural Perspectives on Promoting Health. Chichester: John Wiley & Sons.
- MacLachlan, M. & O'Connell, M. (2000) Cultivating Pluralism: Cultural, Psychological and Social Perspectives on a Changing Ireland. Dublin: Oak Tree Press.
- MacLachlan, M. and Carr, S.C. (1998) Perspectives in Malawian Psychology: A Reader for Students. Zomba: Zikomo Press.
