= Kathryn L. Norsworthy =

Humanitarian psychologist

Kathryn L. Norsworthy is an international humanitarian psychologist and Professor Emerita at Rollins College, whose work focuses on aiding women in the pursuit of human rights and leadership goals.

== Research interests ==
She earned a BS at Georgia Southwestern College and was awarded a PhD by the University of Minnesota. Norsworthy's work has focused on equality, cross-cultural counseling, social justice and the LGBTQ community as well as counseling and social change in Nepal, Thailand, Burma South and Southeast Asia, among others.

== Awards ==
She was awarded the APA'S Outstanding International Psychologist Award in 2007, and the Society of Counseling Psychology (SCP)'s Many Faces of Psychology Award in 2008, as well as its Social Justice Award in 2009. In 2009, she also won the Florence L. Denmark and Mary E. Reuder Award for Outstanding International Contributions to the Psychology of Women and Gender. In 2013, she was awarded the American Counseling Association (ACA)'s Kitty Cole Human Rights Award. In 2017, she was awarded the American Psychological Association (APA)’s International Humanitarian Award in recognition of her humanitarian projects and research in South and Southeast Asia.

== Publications ==
Norsworthy has published multiple works on trauma and recovery. International Handbook of Cross-Cultural Counseling: Cultural Assumptions and Practices Worldwide (ISBN 9781412959568), which she co-edited with Lawrence H. Gerstein and three other scholars, received the 2010 Ursula Gielen Global Psychology Book Award.
