= Gloria E. Baquero Lleras =

Puerto Rican educator and university administrator

President of National University College
- Incumbent
- Assumed office 2011
- Preceded by: Carmen Z. Claudio

33rd Secretary of Education of Puerto Rico
- In office January 2005 – June 2005
- Preceded by: Adalexis Ríos Orlandi
- Succeeded by: Rafael Aragunde Torres

Personal details
- Born: Juana Díaz, Puerto Rico
- Children: 3
- Education: University of Puerto Rico (BA, MA, Ed.D.)

Gloria E. Baquero Lleras is a Puerto Rican educator and university administrator. She was the Secretary of Education of Puerto Rico from January to June 2005. In 2011, Baquero Lleras was appointed president of National University College.

== Early life and education ==
Baquero Lleras was born to Fermina Lleras and Gilberto Baquerro. She is from Juana Díaz, Puerto Rico. She attended elementary school in Yauco and Benigno Fernández García middle school in Cayey. She graduated from Benjamin Harrison School also in Cayey. Baquero Lleras completed a B.A., M.A., and Ed.D. in administration and educational supervision at University of Puerto Rico.

== Career ==
Baquero Lleras was the principal of Berwind Superior School and Antonio Sarriera Egozcue School. In from 1990 to 1992, she was a special assistant to the Secretary of Education. She worked as an educational consultant from 1994 to 1996. She was a general manager at Lucy López Roig y Asociados from 1997 to 2005. She was the Secretary of Education of Puerto Rico from January to June 2005. She returned to Lucy López Roig y Asociados as president from July 2005 to February 2008. In 2011, she succeeded Carmen Z. Claudio as president of National University College.

== Personal life ==
Baquero Lleras is married to Juan E. Candelaria. They have three sons.

== See also ==
- List of women presidents or chancellors of co-ed colleges and universities
