= Mariano Baquero =

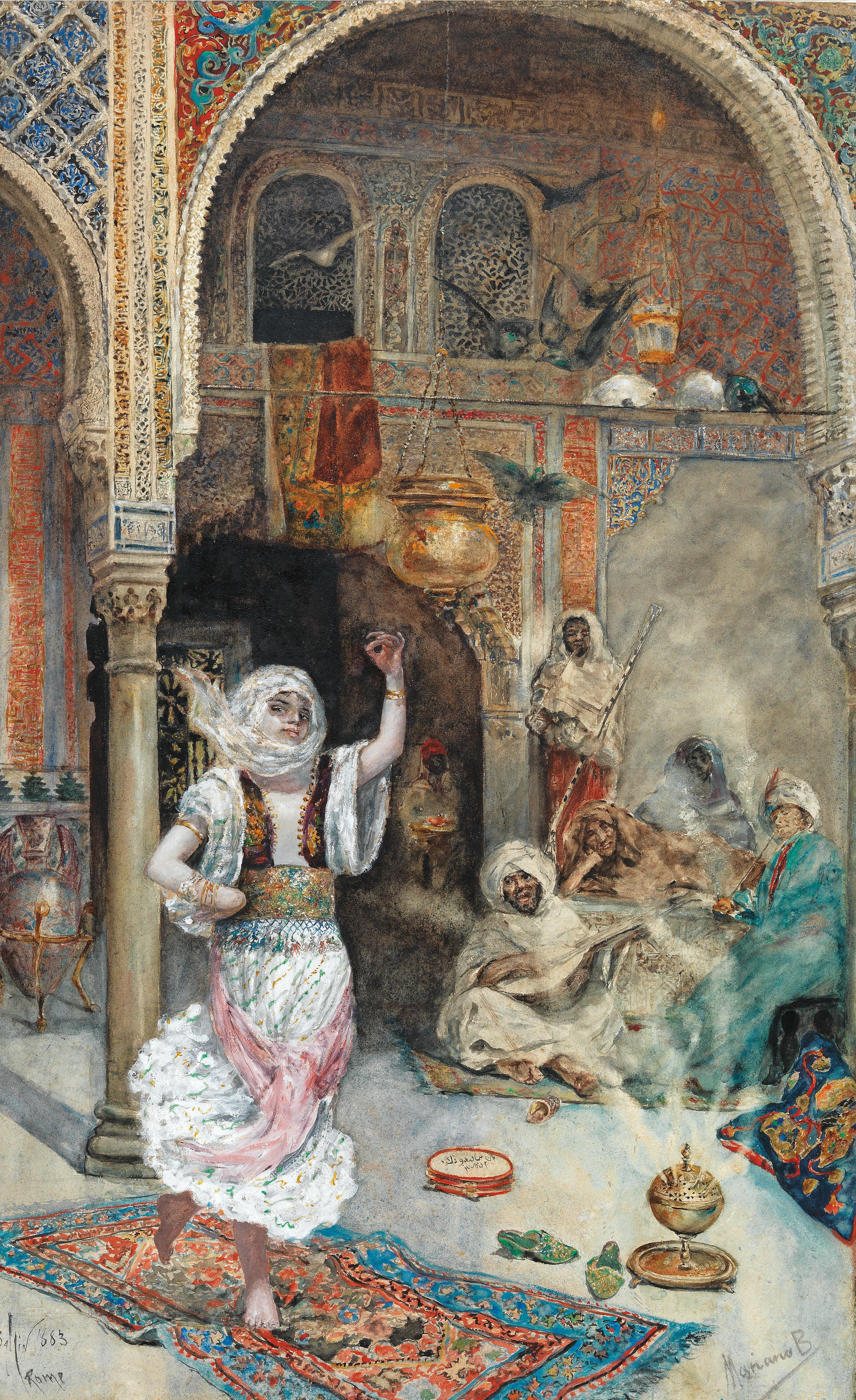
Oriental Dance

Mariano Baquero (1838, Aranjuez – c.1890) was a Spanish painter; best known for his Orientalist scenes.

== Biography ==
Essentially a genre painter, he initially studied in Madrid at the "Escuela Dependiente" of the Real Academia de Bellas Artes de San Fernando. Later, he went to Paris, where he studied under the direction of Charles Gleyre and Paul Césaire Gariot (1811–1880). Watercolors were his preferred medium.

At the National Exhibition of Fine Arts of 1860 he presented one of his most familiar works; based on a scene from the romances of Ángel de Saavedra, which he called La Buena Ventura (Good Luck).
