= Thomas Alva Edison School =

Private school located in Caguas, Puerto Rico

Coordinates: 18°12′45″N 66°3′44″W

Thomas Alva Edison School is a private school located in Caguas, Puerto Rico.

The school was founded in 1966. It began as a Catholic school, but became a secular school in 1992.

The school's mascot is the red Cardinal, which represents their three varsity teams: basketball, volleyball, and soccer.
