= Illinois Psychological Association =

American professional organization

- Abbreviation: IPA
- Formation: August 1936; 89 years ago
- Legal status: 501(c)(6) professional association
- Headquarters: 67 E. Madison St., Ste 1904 Chicago, IL 60603
- President: Margo Jacquot, PsyD
- President-Elect: Erin Alexander, PsyD
- Immediate Past President: Kristina Pecora, PsyD
- Executive Director: Jessica Thomas, MBA
- Website: www.illinoispsychology.org

The Illinois Psychological Association (IPA) is the largest professional association of psychologists in Illinois, with approximately 1,200 licensed, non-licensed, associate, organizational, and student members.

IPA's mission statement: The purpose of the IPA shall be to advance psychology as a science and a profession and as a means of promoting human welfare by the encouragement of psychology in all its branches; by the continual improvement of the qualifications of psychologists through high standards of ethics, conduct, education and achievement; by expanding roles and opportunities for psychologists to serve the public within the field’s emerging scope of scholarship and expertise; and by the increase and dissemination of psychological knowledge through meetings, professional contacts, reports, papers, discussion, publications, electronic media, and current methods of communication.

IPA has 10 Sections – interest groups for various specialties and subspecialties of psychology or topical areas. It is also one of the largest state psychological associations in the United States and is affiliated with the American Psychological Association. The organization has its headquarters in downtown Chicago, Illinois. The IPA hosts an annual convention in the fall. IPA also publishes a quarterly newsletter, the Illinois Psychologist.

== Prescribing Psychologists in Illinois ==
In 2014, under the leadership of President Beth Rom-Rymer and IPA's Legislative Committee, Illinois was the third state to pass legislation enabling clinical psychologists to prescribe psychotropic medication with additional education and training, also known as the Prescriptive authority for psychologists movement (RxP). Illinois' RxP law requires that, in order to become a prescribing psychologist, one must complete undergraduate biomedical coursework (medical terminology, biology, chemistry, microbiology, anatomy & physiology), obtain a master's degree in clinical psychopharmacology, pass a national examination (Psychopharmacology Examination for Psychologists; PEP), and complete a prescribing psychology residency. The residency must include nine medical rotations (family medicine, internal medicine, psychiatry, pediatrics, geriatrics, obstetrics/gynecology, surgery, emergency medicine, elective) that span no fewer than 14 months and no more than 28 months. One must also engage in these rotations for at least 20 hours per week. After one is licensed as a prescribing psychologist, there are several restrictions. For example, a prescribing psychologist in Illinois must have a collaborating physician that reviews their orders at least monthly. Additionally, they may not be delegated the authority to prescribe Schedule II controlled substances, may not treat pregnant patients, those with serious medical conditions, or individuals under 17 years of age. They may also not prescribe controlled substances to be delivered by injection or any Schedule III benzodiazepines. In 2026, legislation (SB 1743) passed in the Illinois General Assembly that removed the restriction of prescribing to individuals over 65.

As of August 2026, there are 24 licensed prescribing psychologists in Illinois, with approximately 50 more in the training pipeline.

== Profile ==
=== Governance ===
IPA is a non-profit corporation in the State of Illinois. IPA's bylaws describe structural components that provide for checks and balances to ensure a democratic process. The organizational entities include:

- IPA President: The IPA's president is elected by the membership and serves a three-year term as part of the presidential trio (e.g., President-Elect, President, Past President). The president chairs the Council of Representatives and Executive Committee. During their term in office, the president performs such duties as prescribed in the bylaws.
- IPA Executive Committee: The Executive Committee (EC) is composed of the officers of the Association (President, President-Elect, Past President, Secretary, Treasurer) and the IPA Representative to the APA Council of Representatives. The EC handles the day-to-day business of the organization and is empowered to act on behalf of the Association between IPA Council of Representative meetings. The EC meets monthly.
- IPA Council of Representatives: The Council has sole authority to set policy and make decisions regarding IPA's assets. It is composed of 24 elected members: the officers, representatives from various regions across the state (e.g., North, Metropolitan, North Central, South Central, South), as well as section chairs of the association. The Council of Representatives meets quarterly.
- IPA Committee Structure: Members of committees conduct much of the Association's work on a volunteer basis. They carry out a wide variety of tasks suggested by their names.

=== Council of Representatives Structure ===
IPA has 10 Sections that represent specialties or subspecialties in psychology or topical areas. IPA also has seven Regional Representatives that represent all geographic regions of Illinois. Each Section Chair and Region Representative is a voting member of the IPA Council of Representatives. Each Section Chair and Region Representative serves a renewable, two-year term.

==== IPA Sections ====
- Academic
- Behavioral Medicine & Neuropsychology
- Clinical Practice
- Early Career Psychologists
- Ethnic Minority Affairs
- Graduate Students
- Organizational & Business Consulting
- Sexual Orientation & Gender Diversity
- Social Responsibility
- Women's Issues

==== Regions ====
- North
- Metropolitan
- North Central
- South Central
- South

== Press Releases ==
Endorsement of Statement on Gun Reform

In June 2022, under the leadership of President Dr. Abigail Brown, the IPA Council of Representatives endorsed the American Psychological Association's call for gun reform in the wake of the mass shooting in Uvalde, Texas in May 2022.

Endorsement of Statement on Restricting Access to Abortion

In May 2022, under the leadership of President Dr. Abigail Brown, the IPA Council of Representatives endorsed the American Psychological Association's statement on the likely mental health harms associated with denying access to abortion in light of the possibility of the overturning of Roe v. Wade by the United States Supreme Court.

Statement Against Police Brutality

In June 2020, under the leadership of President Dr. Kalyani Gopal, the IPA Council of Representatives approved and released a "Statement Against Police Brutality" in light of the race-related events around the United States in the summer of 2020.

Statement on the Separation of Families at the Border

In July 2018, under the leadership of President Dr. Lynda Behrendt, the IPA Council of Representatives approved and released a "Statement Against the Separation of Families at the Border" in response to the federal government's policy to separate families who arrived at the U.S.-Mexico border.

== IPA Presidents (1949 – present) ==
- 1949 – 1950 Robert Seashore, PhD
- 1950 – 1951 James Miller, PhD
- 1951 – 1952 Irwin Berg, PhD
- 1952 – 1953 Ross Stagner, PhD
- 1953 – 1954 George Yacorzynski, PhD
- 1954 – 1955 Stanley Marzolf, PhD
- 1955 – 1956 William Sloan, PhD
- 1956 – 1957 Leo Hellmer, PhD
- 1957 – 1958 Noble Kelley, PhD
- 1958 – 1959 George Speer, PhD
- 1959 – 1960 Ralh Heine, PhD
- 1960 – 1961 Alan Rosenwald, PhD
- 1961 – 1962 A. Arthur Hartman, PhD
- 1962 – 1963 Robert McFarland, PhD
- 1963 – 1964 Phillip Ash, PhD
- 1964 – 1965 Leroy Vernon, PhD
- 1965 – 1966 Albert Hunsicker, PhD
- 1966 – 1967 Fred Spaner, PhD
- 1967 – 1968 Joseph Wepman, PhD
- 1968 – 1969 Charles Dewey, PhD
- 1969 – 1970 Vin Rosenthal, PhD
- 1970 – 1971 Alan Rosenwald, PhD
- 1971 – 1972 Walter Friendhoff, PhD
- 1972 – 1973 Virginia Harris, PhD
- 1973 – 1974 Helen Sunukjian, PhD
- 1974 – 1975 Robert C. Nicolay, PhD
- 1975 – 1976 Sol Rosenberg, PhD
- 1976 – 1977 Robert P. Barrell, PhD
- 1977 – 1978 Bruce E. Bennett, PhD
- 1978 – 1979 Thomas Hollan, PhD
- 1979 – 1980 Mary Kay Pribyl, PhD
- 1980 – 1981 Ian Wickram, PhD
- 1981 – 1982 Daniel Beach, PhD
- 1982 – 1983 Mary Ann Poprick, PhD
- 1983 – 1984 Sue E. Moriearty, PhD
- 1984 – 1985 Edmund J. Nightingale, PhD, ABPP
- 1985 – 1986 Joseph F. Pribyl, PhD
- 1986 – 1987 Michael Mercer, PhD
- 1987 – 1988 Joseph S. Maciejko, PhD
- 1988 – 1989 Jean J. Rossi, PhD
- 1989 – 1990 Bruce E. Bonecutter, PhD
- 1990 – 1991 Terrence J. Koller, PhD, ABPP
- 1991 – 1992 Donald Paull, PhD, JD, ABPP
- 1992 – 1993 Randy J. Georgemiller, PhD
- 1993 – 1994 Ronald H. Rozensky, PhD, ABPP
- 1994 – 1995 Nancy A. Slagg, PhD
- 1995 – 1996 Lisa R. Grossman, JD, PhD
- 1996 – 1997 Patricia A. Pimental, PsyD, ABN
- 1997 – 1998 John R. Day, PhD
- 1998 – 1999 Chris E. Stout, PsyD, MBA
- 1999 – 2000 Katherine B. Klehr, PhD
- 2000 – 2001 Nancy Molitor, PhD
- 2001 – 2002 Marlin Hoover, PhD, ABPP
- 2002 – 2003 Kenneth H. Kessler, PhD
- 2003 – 2004 Mary E. Halpin, PhD
- 2004 – 2005 Armand R. Cerbone, PhD, ABPP
- 2005 – 2006 John Blattner, PhD
- 2006 – 2007 Eleanore Ryan, PhD
- 2007 – 2008 Steven Rothke, PhD, ABPP
- 2008 – 2009 Gregory Sarlo, PsyD
- 2009 – 2010 Steven Rothke, PhD, ABPP
- 2010 – 2011 Gregory Sarlo, PsyD
- 2011 – 2012 Beth N. Rom-Rymer, PhD
- 2012 – 2013 Patricia Farrell, PhD
- 2013 – 2014 Beth N. Rom-Rymer, PhD
- 2014 – 2015 Blaine Lesnik, PsyD
- 2015 – 2016 Karla Steingraber, PsyD
- 2016 – 2017 Joseph E. Troiani, PhD
- 2017 – 2018 Laura L. Faynor-Ciha, PhD
- 2018 – 2019 Lynda Behrendt, PsyD
- 2019 – 2020 Kalyani Gopal, PhD
- 2020 – 2021 Daniel Brewer, PsyD
- 2021 – 2022 Abigail Brown, PsyD
- 2022 – 2023 Derek C. Phillips, PsyD, MSCP, ABMP
- 2023 – 2024 Colin Ennis, PsyD
- 2024 - 2025 Sue Bae, PhD
- 2025 - 2026 Kristina Pecora, PsyD, MPP
