= Cayures River =

River of Puerto Rico

Coordinates: 17.9680221°N 66.3523911°W

- Native name: Río Cayures (Spanish)

Location
- Commonwealth: Puerto Rico
- Municipality: Santa Isabel

Physical characteristics
- Source
  - location: Jauca 2, Santa Isabel
- Mouth
  - location: Rincón Bay in Jauca 1, Santa Isabel
  - elevation: 0 ft.

The Cayures River (Spanish: Río Cayures) is a river of Santa Isabel, Puerto Rico. It is a heavily canalized river, being one of the local hydrological systems used to supply water to the Coamo River basin to create the 19th century irrigation system developed to supply the growing agricultural industry of Santa Isabel. Its mouth is located in the Rincón Bay.

== See also ==
- List of rivers of Puerto Rico
