= Porto Rico Irrigation Service =

- U.S. National Register of Historic Places
- U.S. Historic district
- Location within Puerto Rico
- Location: Arroyo, Juana Díaz, Patillas, Santa Isabel and Salinas, Puerto Rico
- Coordinates: 18°0′52″N 66°23′24″W
- Built: 1914
- NRHP reference No.: 100012627
- Added to NRHP: January 26, 2026

The Porto Rico Irrigation Service (PRIS) was the first major public irrigation network to be established in Puerto Rico. The South Coast Irrigation District (Distrito de Riego de la Costa Sur) of the Porto Rico Irrigation Service was added to the National Register of Historic Places (NRHP) on January 26, 2026. This irrigation district consists of a network of reservoirs and interconnected canals built to provide water to the sugarcane-growing farmlands across the south and southeastern plains of Puerto Rico. The PRIS was also responsible for building the first units of electricity production in the island, particularly the Carite Dam, first operated by the Autoridad de Fuentes Fluviales, today the Puerto Rico Electric Power Authority.

The NRHP-inscribed properties include the entirety of the South Coast Irrigation District, consisting of five dams originally built by PRIS, the original hydroelectric power generators along the Carite system, and the three main irrigation canals of Juana Díaz, Patillas and Guamaní, all dating to the 1910s. The South Coast Irrigation District is also notable for being one of the oldest hydroelectric projects of its magnitude in the United States, preceding the Tennessee Valley Authority by 18 years.

== History ==
Following the 1898 United States occupation of Puerto Rico in the aftermath of the Spanish–American War, sugarcane became the primary cash crop in the island during the first half of the 20th century, growing from 20% of total exports in 1890 to over 65% by 1920. While the northern plains of the island had already been developed for the mass production of sugar, the drier conditions of the southern coast limited the steady mass production of the crop in the north, where large centralized processing mills and refineries were quickly replacing the smaller traditional 19th-century haciendas.

As a result of the Puerto Rico Public Irrigation Act of 1908, the Porto Rico Irrigation Service was established in 1908 by the Department of the Interior in order to develop an irrigation network to supply water to the arid and semi-arid areas along the southern and southeastern coastal plains of the island. At the time, these areas were a major core for the rapidly expanding sugarcane industry in the island. The development of this irrigation network began with the impoundment by reservoirs of major river basins along focal hydrological points in the southern foothills of the Cordillera Central and the Sierra de Cayey, and the construction of irrigation canals, aqueducts and water management systems in the municipalities of Arroyo, Guayama, Juana Díaz, Patillas, Salinas, Santa Isabel and Villalba. The Porto Rico Irrigation Service, on behalf of the Puerto Rico Electric Power Authority, was also responsible for the construction of the Guajataca Dam between 1927 and 1929. Despite successfully surviving several hurricanes and tropical storms, vulnerability to further erosion caused by hurricanes and earthquakes prompted the retrofitting of the dams in the network throughout the 1950s and 1960s. Although the Porto Rico Irrigation Service no longer exists as an entity, much of its hydrological management system is still used by the Puerto Rico Aqueduct and Sewer Authority today.

== Irrigation network ==
=== Carite Lake ===
Carite Lake (Lago Carite or Embalse Carite), located in the barrio of the same name in the municipality of Guayama, was formed by the impoundment of the headwaters of La Plata River (Río de la Plata). Its dam was built in 1913 with the additional intention of generating hydroelectric energy. Today it has a storage capacity of about 11,310 acre-feet and a maximum storage capacity of about 17,349 acre-feet.

=== Coamo Lake ===
Coamo Lake (Lago Coamo or Embalse de Coamo) was formed by impounding the Coamo River (Río Coamo) in 1914. The reservoir is located in the barrios Descalabrado and Jauca 2 of the municipality of Santa Isabel, close to the Coamo hot springs. It has a storage capacity of approximately 1,380 acre-feet with a surface area spanning almost 145 acres. Its 65-foot-tall buttress dam was upgraded in 1968 in order to improve flood management. Despite this, rainfall produced by Tropical Storm Isabel in 1985 produced devastating flooding along the reservoir basin, virtually destroying the bridge carrying highway PR-52 across the river, and resulting in 30 fatalities.

=== Guayabal Lake ===
Guayabal Lake (Lago Guayabal or Embalse Guayabal) was formed by impounding the Jacaguas River (Río Jacaguas) along the municipal boundary of Juana Díaz and Villalba in 1913. Construction of its dam began in 1912 but its use for irrigation officially began in 1914. The reservoir extends through the barrio Guayabal in Juana Díaz, and Villalba Abajo and Hato Puerco Abajo in Villalba. Its original capacity was 11.82 million cubic meters, but with upgrades in the 1940s and 1950s and the construction of Toa Vaca Lake upstream from it in 1972, its current capacity is now approximately 4.98 million cubic meters.

=== Melanía Lake ===
Melanía Lake (Lago Melanía or Embalse de Melanía), located in the barrio Pozo Hondo of the municipality of Guayama, was created between 1910 and 1914 in order to provide support to the irrigation systems of the Carite and Patillas reservoirs. The reservoir was created by impounding Ana Melanía Creek (Quebrada Ana Melanía) and it receives additional water from nearby Guamaní River (Río Guamaní) by means of the Guamaní irrigation canal, which in turns further connects the basin to the Carite reservoir and the northbound La Plata River basin. The reservoir today still functions as part of the potable water supply system and as a recreational site for fishing.

=== Patillas Lake ===
Patillas Dam in the aftermath of Hurricane Maria (2017)

Patillas Lake (Lago Patillas or Embalse de Patillas) was built between 1910 and 1914 by impounding the Patillas River (Río Grande de Patillas) in order to provide support to the irrigation networks of the Nigua River basin. The Patillas Canal, spanning about 20 miles (or 32 kilometers), connects it to the Nigua River downstream. The reservoir spans approximately 326 acres and extends through the barrios Cacao Alto, Jagual, Marín and Patillas barrio-pueblo in the municipality of Patillas. Today it is also used for hydroelectric power generation by the Puerto Rico Electric Power Authority.

=== Irrigation canals ===
In addition to the reservoirs, the Porto Rico Irrigation Service built an extensive interconnected network of canals and aqueducts amounting to approximately 65 linear miles. Its three major canals are the Juana Díaz (24.6 linear miles), Patillas (24.4 linear miles) and Guamaní (13.5 linear miles) canals.

== See also ==
- Las Tres Haciendas Waterworks, a smaller previous project in the same region
- Guajataca Lake, also built by the Porto Rico Irrigation Service
