= Punta Petrona Natural Reserve =

Protected area in Puerto Rico

- Reserva Natural Punta Petrona
- IUCN category V (protected landscape/seascape)
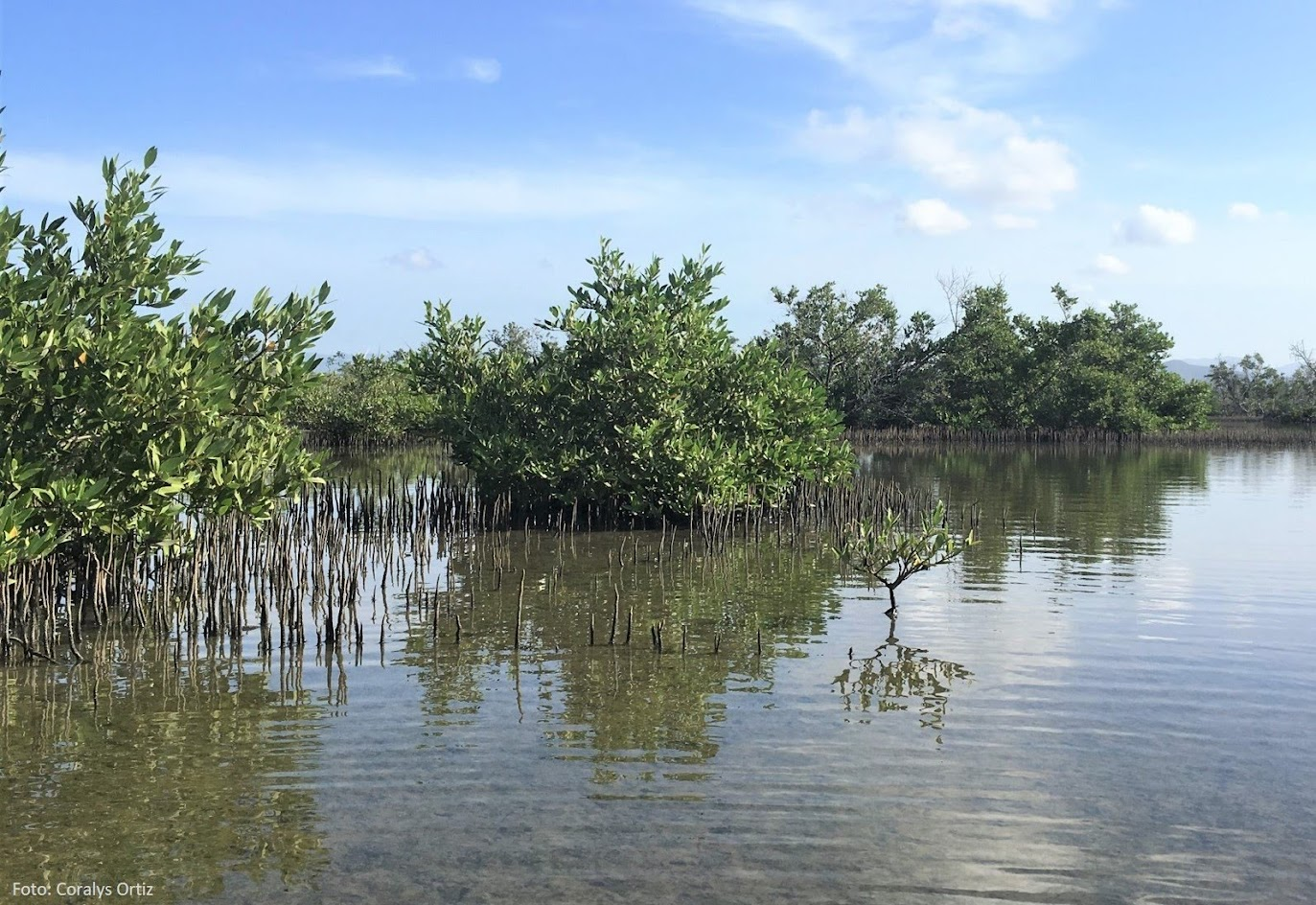
- Punta Petrona Natural Reserve (2022)

- Location within Puerto Rico
- Location: Santa Isabel, Puerto Rico
- Coordinates: 17.939°N 66.384°W

Punta Petrona is a cape and protected area located in southern Puerto Rico, in the Felicia 1 district (Spanish: barrio) of the municipality of Santa Isabel. Located in the Caribbean Sea coast, it is bordered by the Rincón Bay to the east, and the bight of Caja de Muertos to the west. Punta Petrona contains a mangrove forest and it is surrounded by small cays, namely the Cayos Caracoles ('shell cays'), Cayos Cabezazos ('head cays') and Cayo Alfeñique ('weak cay'), which serve as a habitats for the West Indian manatee. It is also an important coral reef area frequented by sea turtles. The area is protected as the Punta Petrona Natural Reserve, part of the wider Aguirre State Forest; however, the Puerto Rican Planning Society (Sociedad Puertorriqueña de Planificación) revealed in 2018 that this nature reserve did not have the proper state management and classification regulations.

Punta Petrona can be accessed by private boat from nearby Jauca and El Malecón areas of Santa Isabel.

== See also ==
- Aguirre State Forest
