= Las Tres Haciendas Waterworks =

- Sistema de riego de las tres haciendas
- U.S. National Register of Historic Places
- U.S. Historic district
- Location within Puerto Rico
- Location: Santa Isabel, Puerto Rico
- Coordinates: 17°58′47″N 66°23′23″W
- Built: 1846
- NRHP reference No.: 16000853
- Added to NRHP: December 13, 2016

Las Tres Haciendas Waterworks (Spanish: Sistema de riego de las tres haciendas) is an irrigation system located in Santa Isabel, Puerto Rico. It consists of a set of structures that were built between 1846 and 1886 by landowners to transport water from the Coamo River to the fields of their sugarcane plantations. Las Tres Haciendas (Spanish for 'the three homesteads') is named refers to the three sugarcane haciendas it serves: El Destino, Florida, and Hacienda Santa Isabel.

The waterworks historic district covers an area that spreads through the Santa Isabel barrios of Boca Velázquez, Jauca II, Felicia II, Felicia I, and Santa Isabel Pueblo.

== History ==
The system includes seven structures: a dam on the Coamo River, a torrential water inlet (toma de aguas torrenciales), a seasonal water module, a main supply channel (with underground and open sections), three branch lines serving each hacienda, and remnants of a water distribution module.

The main supply channel and the three branch lines are characterized by not presenting side locks, except for those added when this system was integrated into the Irrigation District of the Southern Coast (Distrito de riego de la costa sur), built between 1908 and 1914. The Tres haciendas system runs for 9.7 km through the coastal plain of Santa Isabel, using only gravity to transport the water through a set of underground, open, and elevated channels. The system is not in use since the 1990s which has resulted in some deterioration of its components. It presents some modifications and repairs dating to the 20th century, when the canals were integrated to the newer irrigation system. Sections of the system have been impacted by modern agricultural machinery, and one of its key components, the distribution module, was partially demolished, albeit under archaeological supervision. However, this is one of the most complete and well-preserved irrigation systems of the 19th century in the southern coastal valley, and possibly of the island.

The irrigation system was added to the United States National Register of Historic Places in 2016.

== See also ==
- Central Cortada
