= Puerto Rico Highway 538 =

Highway in Puerto Rico

Highway 538
- Ruta 538
- Calle Celis Aguilera

Route information
- Maintained by Puerto Rico DTPW
- Length: 1.7 km (1.1 mi)
- Existed: 1953–present

Major junctions
- South end: Calle Vista Mar in Playa
- PR-5538 in Playa
- North end: PR-1 in Santa Isabel barrio-pueblo

Location
- Country: United States
- Territory: Puerto Rico
- Municipalities: Santa Isabel

Highway system
- Roads in Puerto Rico; List
← PR-525	→ PR-549
← PR-5525	PR-5538	→ PR-5567

Puerto Rico Highway 538 (PR-538) is a north–south road located entirely in the municipality of Santa Isabel, Puerto Rico. With a length of 1.7 kilometers (1.1 mi), it begins at its junction with PR-1 in downtown Santa Isabel and ends at the Malecón in Playa barrio.

== Major intersections ==
The entire route is located in Santa Isabel.

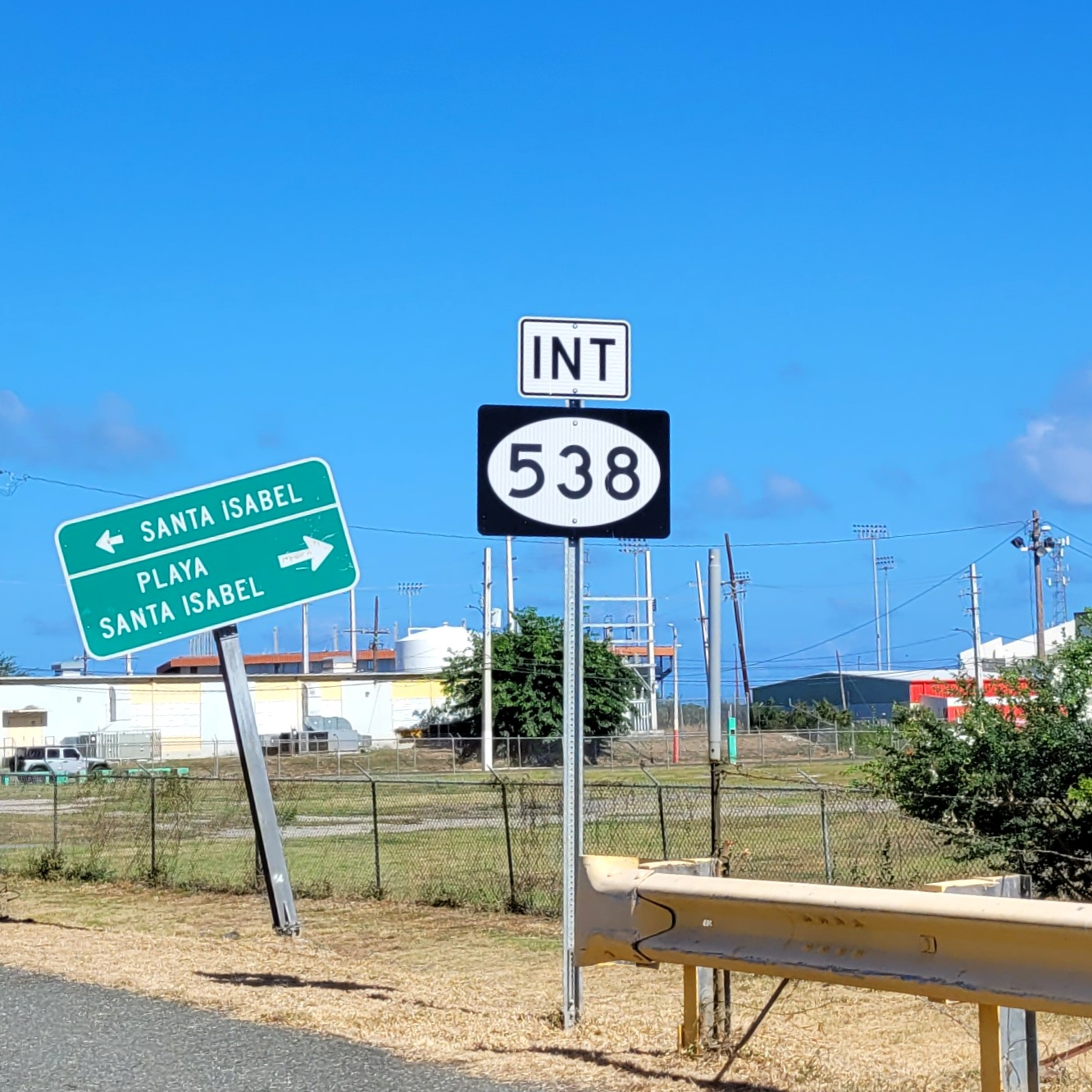
PR-5538 south near PR-538 in Playa

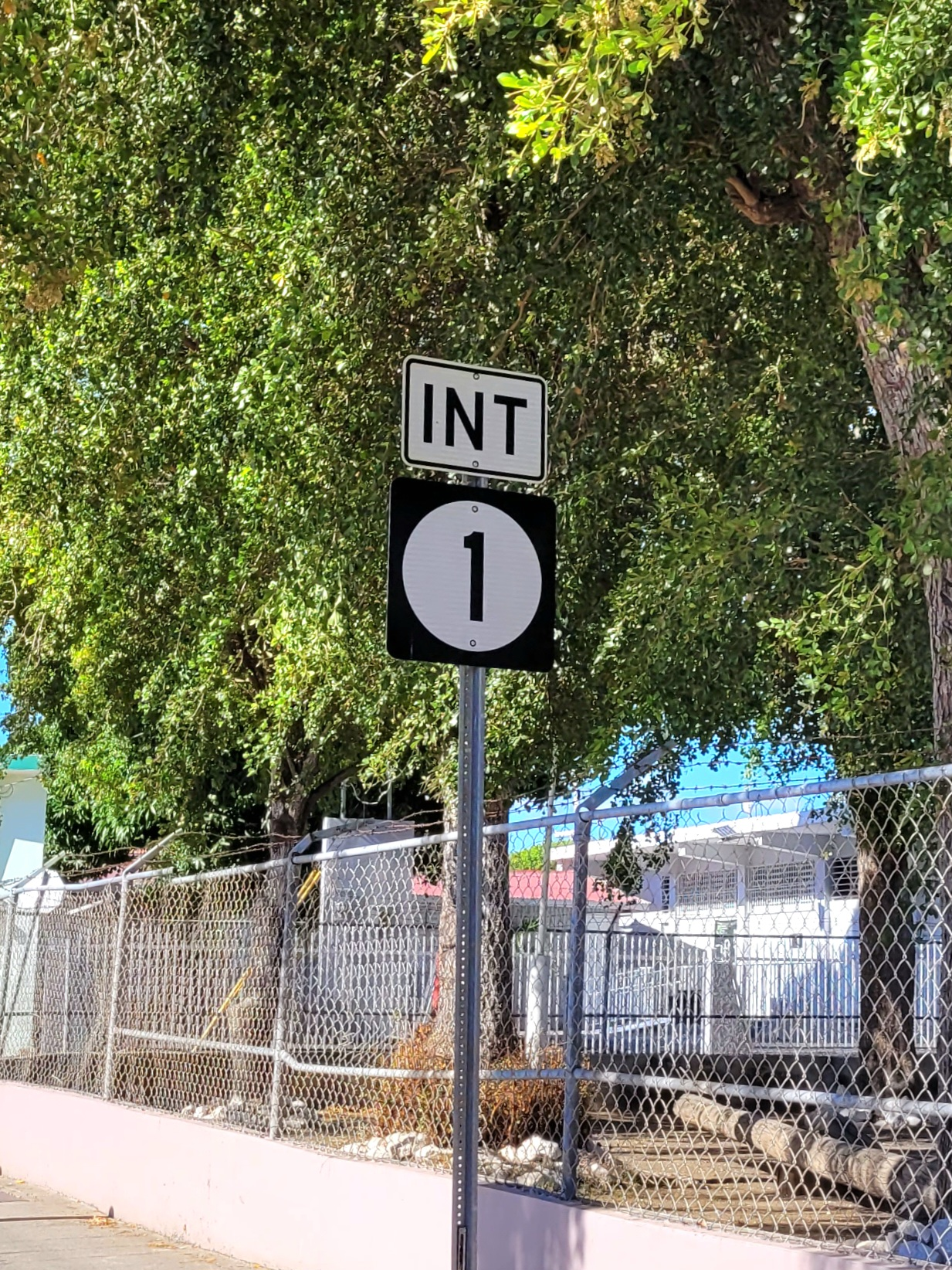
PR-538 north approaching PR-1 in downtown Santa Isabel

Location	km	mi	Destinations	Notes
Playa	1.7	1.1	PR-Calle Vista Mar – Playa	Southern terminus of PR-538
Playa	0.7	0.43	PR-5538 (Desvío Sur de Santa Isabel) – Santa Isabel	
Santa Isabel barrio-pueblo	0.0	0.0	PR-1 – Salinas, Ponce	Northern terminus of PR-538
1.000 mi = 1.609 km; 1.000 km = 0.621 mi

== Related route ==
Highway 5538
- Location: Santa Isabel
- Length: 1.9 km (1.2 mi)

Puerto Rico Highway 5538 (PR-5538) is a spur of PR-538 located in Santa Isabel. This road is a bypass located southwest of the downtown area and goes from PR-538 to PR-1 and PR-5507. The entire route is located in Santa Isabel.

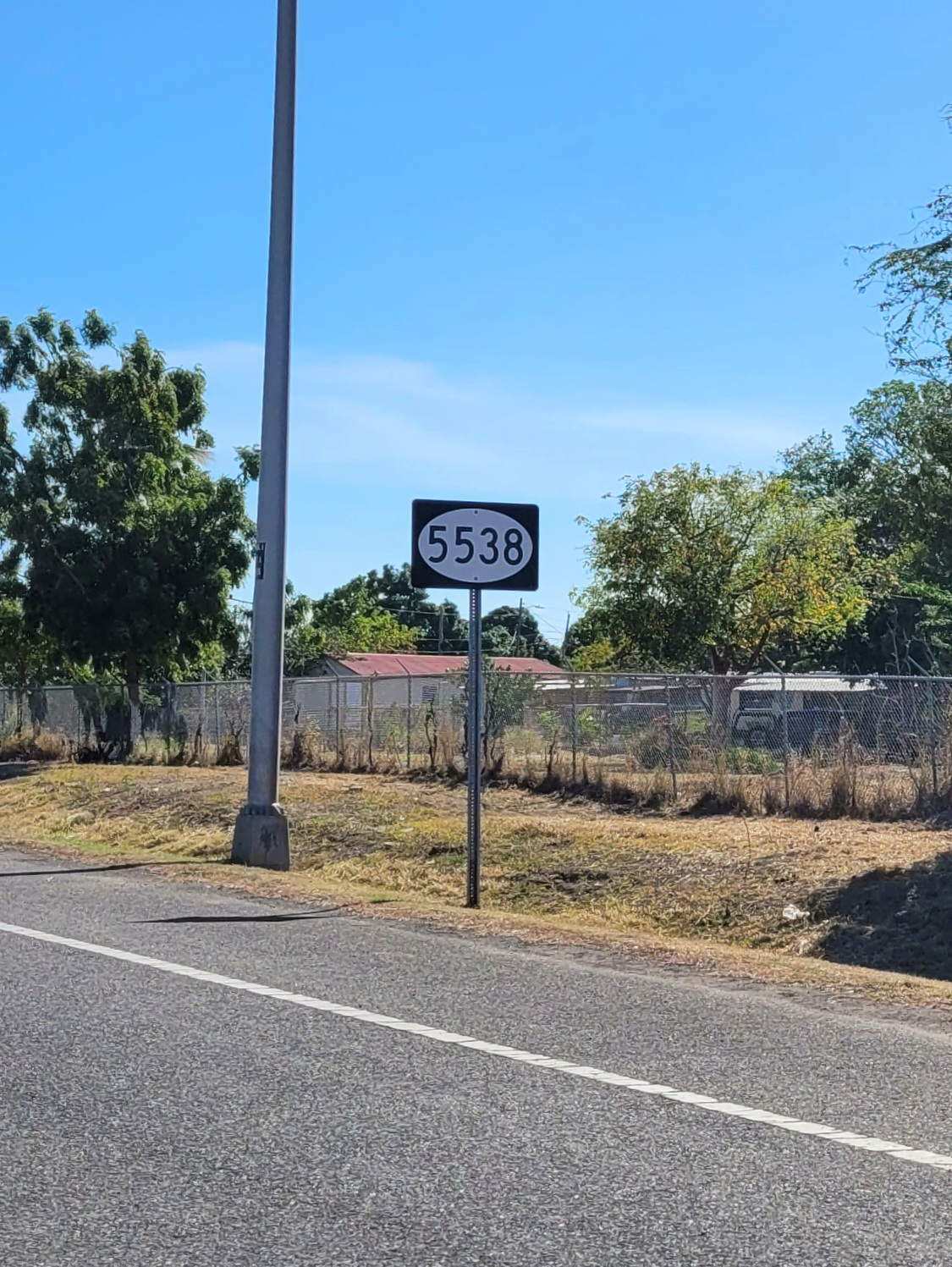
PR-5538 south in downtown Santa Isabel

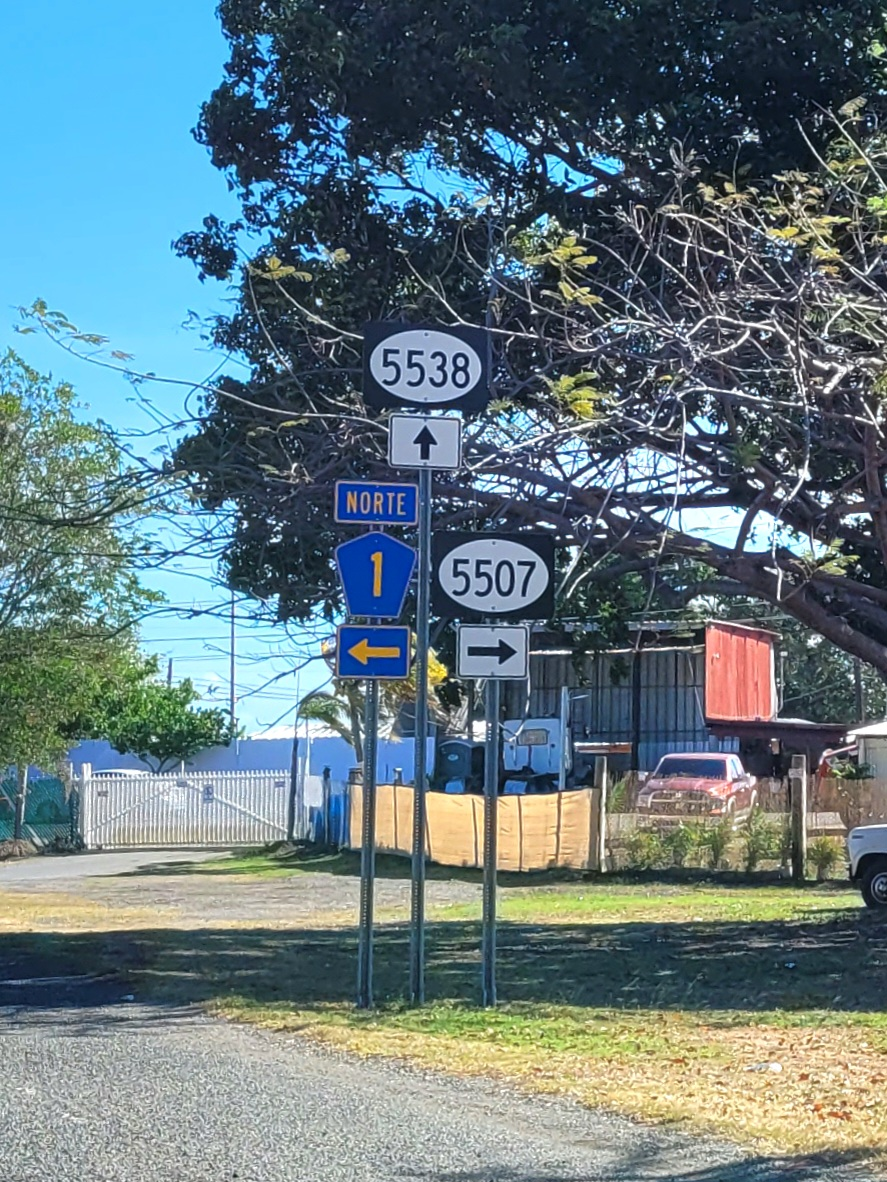
PR-1 at PR-5507 and PR-5538 intersection in downtown Santa Isabel

Location	km	mi	Destinations	Notes
Playa	1.9	1.2	PR-538 (Calle Celis Aguilera) – Santa Isabel	Southern terminus of PR-5538
Santa Isabel barrio-pueblo	0.0	0.0	PR-1 / PR-5507 – Santa Isabel	Northern terminus of PR-5538
1.000 mi = 1.609 km; 1.000 km = 0.621 mi

== See also ==
- 1953 Puerto Rico highway renumbering
