= Rincón Bay =

Bay in southern coast of Puerto Rico

Coordinates: 17°57′25″N 66°20′00″W

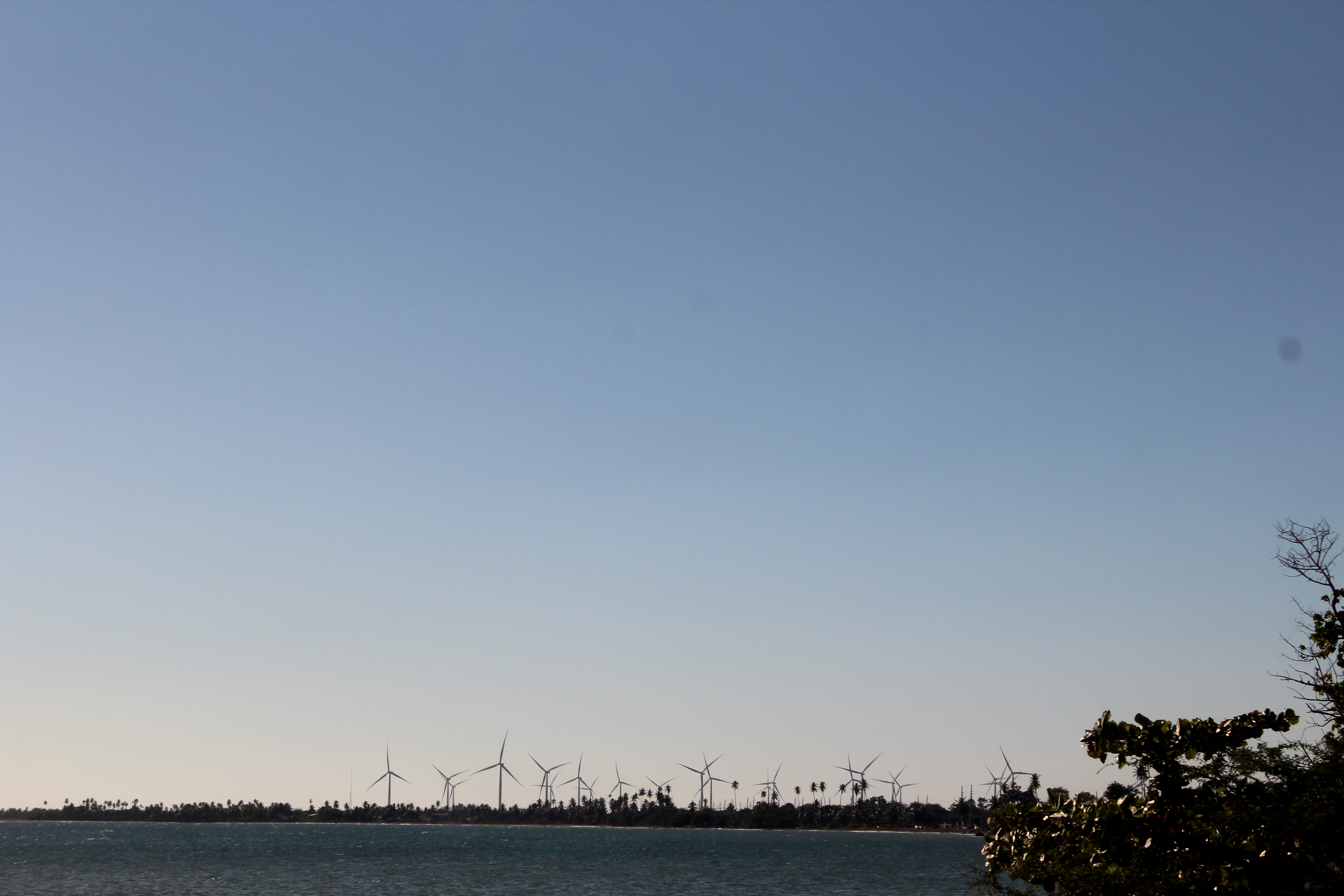
View of the bay from route PR-1.

Rincón Bay (Spanish: Bahía de Rincón) is the widest bay in the southern coast of Puerto Rico, located along the coasts of the municipalities of Salinas and Santa Isabel. The bay receives the flow of many rivers and creeks such as the Cayures, Jueyes and Nigua rivers. The Jauca Bay is a smaller cove located within the Rincón Bay in Jauca, Santa Isabel. The bay is also home to a number of small islands and keys covered in mangrove forests (protected as the Punta Petrona Nature Reserve and the Aguirre State Forest) which serve as the habitat to numerous species such as the West Indian manatee. Some of the settlements found in the bay are Jauca in the municipality of Santa Isabel, and Las Ochenta and Playa de Salinas in the municipality of Salinas.
