= Nigua River (Salinas, Puerto Rico) =

River of Puerto Rico

Coordinates: 17.9688553°N 66.3123907°W

- Native name: Río Nigua (Spanish)

Location
- Commonwealth: Puerto Rico
- Municipality: Salinas

The Nigua River (Spanish: Río Nigua) is a river of Salinas, Puerto Rico, which flows south to Rincón Bay (Spanish: Bahía de Rincón) in Santa Isabel, Puerto Rico.

== Flood control project ==
In mid 2018, the United States Army Corps of Engineers announced it would be undertaking a major flood control project of the river, with a $60 million budget.

== See also ==
- List of rivers of Puerto Rico
