= Dr. Martin G. Brumbaugh Graded School =

- U.S. National Register of Historic Places
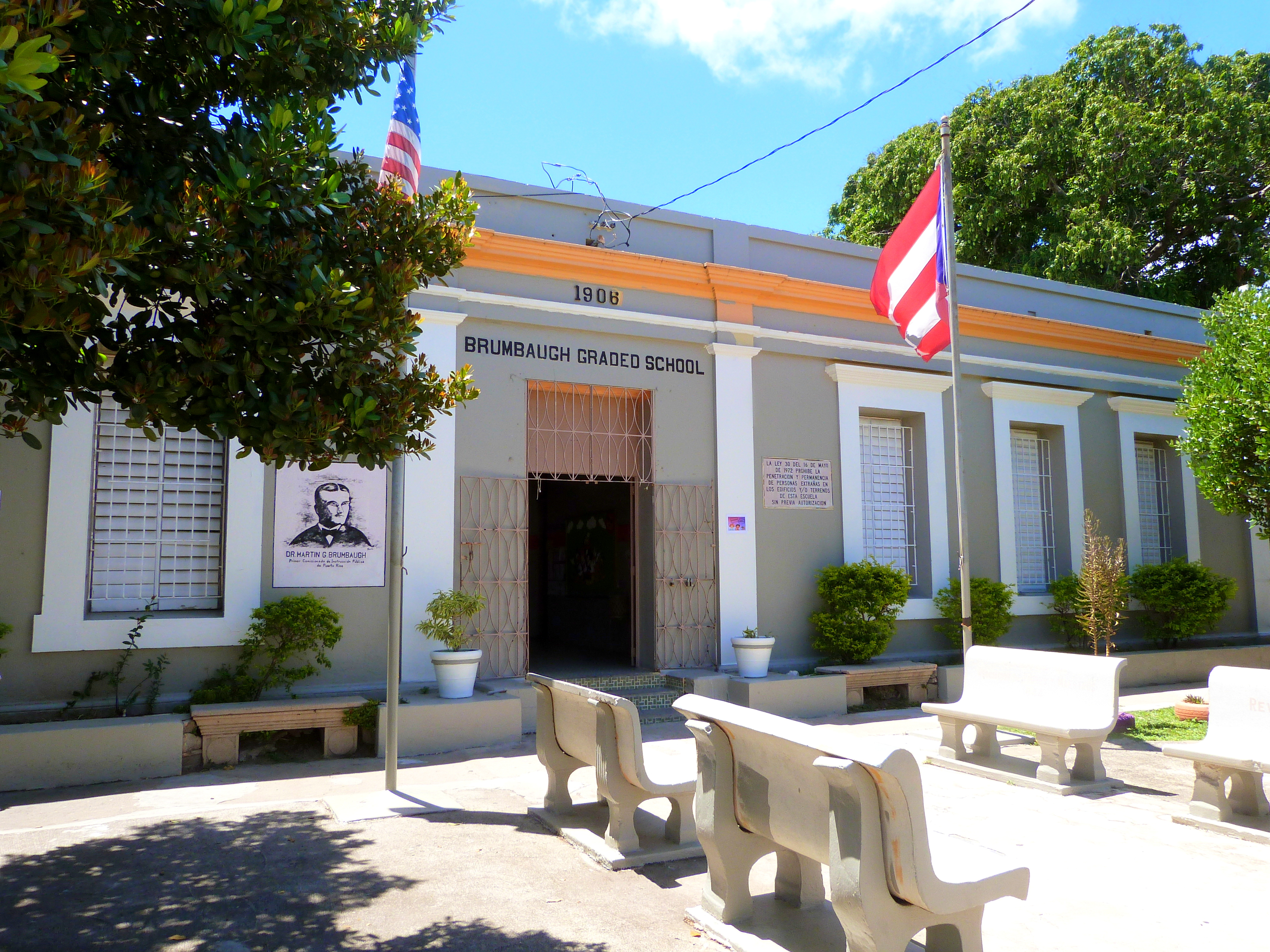

- Location within Puerto Rico
- Location: 33 Eugenio M. de Hostos Street, Santa Isabel Pueblo, Santa Isabel, Puerto Rico
- Coordinates: 17.967723°N 66.404196°W
- Area: 1.3 acres (0.53 ha)
- Built: 1906
- Architect: Adrian Finlayson; et al.
- Architectural style: Classical Revival
- MPS: Early Twentieth Century Schools in Puerto Rico TR
- NRHP reference No.: 10001217
- Added to NRHP: February 4, 2011

The Dr. Martin G. Brumbaugh Graded School (Spanish: Escuela de la Comunidad Dr. Martin G. Brumbaugh) is a former school in Santa Isabel Pueblo, Puerto Rico. Built in 1906, it is named for Martin Grove Brumbaugh, the 26th Governor of Pennsylvania and an influential educator who headed Puerto Rico's school programming after the U.S. ousted Spain. The school was added to the National Register of Historic Places (NRHP) in 2011.

Situated near the town square of Santa Isabel Pueblo, the school was recognized as "one of the oldest and best-preserved early twentieth-century schools in Puerto Rico." It retains most of its original physical features, including its structure, spatial relationships, proportions, and construction materials. The Dr. Martin G. Brumbaugh Graded School is of statewide significance under Criterion C for Architecture, as it represents early twentieth-century construction methods for educational facilities in Puerto Rico, harmoniously combining three distinct construction periods. The property is also significant under Criterion A for Social History as a prime example of the early U.S.-led social initiative in Puerto Rico, which promoted education alongside a political agenda of Americanization and cultural assimilation throughout the island.

The school was closed in 2018.
