= Coamo River =

River of Puerto Rico

- Native name: Río Coamo (Spanish)

Location
- Commonwealth: Puerto Rico
- Municipalities: Coamo, Santa Isabel

Physical characteristics
- Source
  - coordinates: 17.9594110°N 66.4282256°W

Basin features
- Landmarks: Las Tres Haciendas Waterworks
- Tributaries
  - left: Cuyón River
  - right: Las Minas River
- Bridges: Padre Íñigo Bridge

The Coamo River (Spanish: Río Coamo) is a river in southern Puerto Rico. It runs for approximately 24 miles or 38 kilometers through the municipalities of Coamo and Santa Isabel, where it empties into the Caribbean Sea at Coamo Bay in Boca Velázquez. Its source lies in the Cordillera Central, on the Pulguillas ward (barrio).

The Coamo River and its coastal wetlands host great egrets and other wildlife throughout the year. The river was dredged and cleaned after damages and flooding caused by Hurricane Maria in 2017. It also contains irrigation dams, such as the Coamo Reservoir Dam in Santa Isabel.

== See also ==
- Padre Íñigo Bridge: Crosses the river in Coamo, Puerto Rico
- Las Tres Haciendas Waterworks: irrigation project from the river
- List of rivers of Puerto Rico
