= Padre Íñigo Bridge =

- U.S. National Register of Historic Places
- Puerto Rico Historic Sites and Zones
- Location within Puerto Rico
- Location: Highway 14, km 34.2, Coamo, Puerto Rico
- Coordinates: 18°4′53″N 66°21′15″W
- Built: 1879
- Architect: Raymundo Campubri
- NRHP reference No.: 95000840
- RNSZH No.: 2001-(RS)-23-JP-SH

Significant dates
- Added to NRHP: July 19, 1995
- Designated RNSZH: May 16, 2001

Padre Íñigo Bridge (Spanish: Puente Padre Íñigo), also known as the Coamo Bridge (Puente de Coamo) or Bridge #174, is a historic lattice girder bridge that crosses the Coamo River in the municipality of the same name in southern Puerto Rico. It was added to the United States National Register of Historic Places in 1995, and to the Puerto Rico Register of Historic Sites and Zones in 2001.

The bridge, built between 1853 and 1879, is the earliest extant multi-span lattice girder bridge and the only one with continuous girders in Puerto Rico. Its foundations consist of precious wood piles 3 meters deep. Designed by engineer Raymundo Campubri, a noted builder-designer, it was manufactured by Eugene Rollin & Co. in Belgium for 29,590 francs. The 70-ton structure was brought from Europe aboard the ship Galeon. The bridge was built as part of the old Carretera Central, the first highway across the Cordillera Central mountain range. The bridge is now only open to pedestrians and a new bridge built in 1983 bypasses it today.
