= Boca Velázquez =

Barrio of Santa Isabel, Puerto Rico

- Barrio
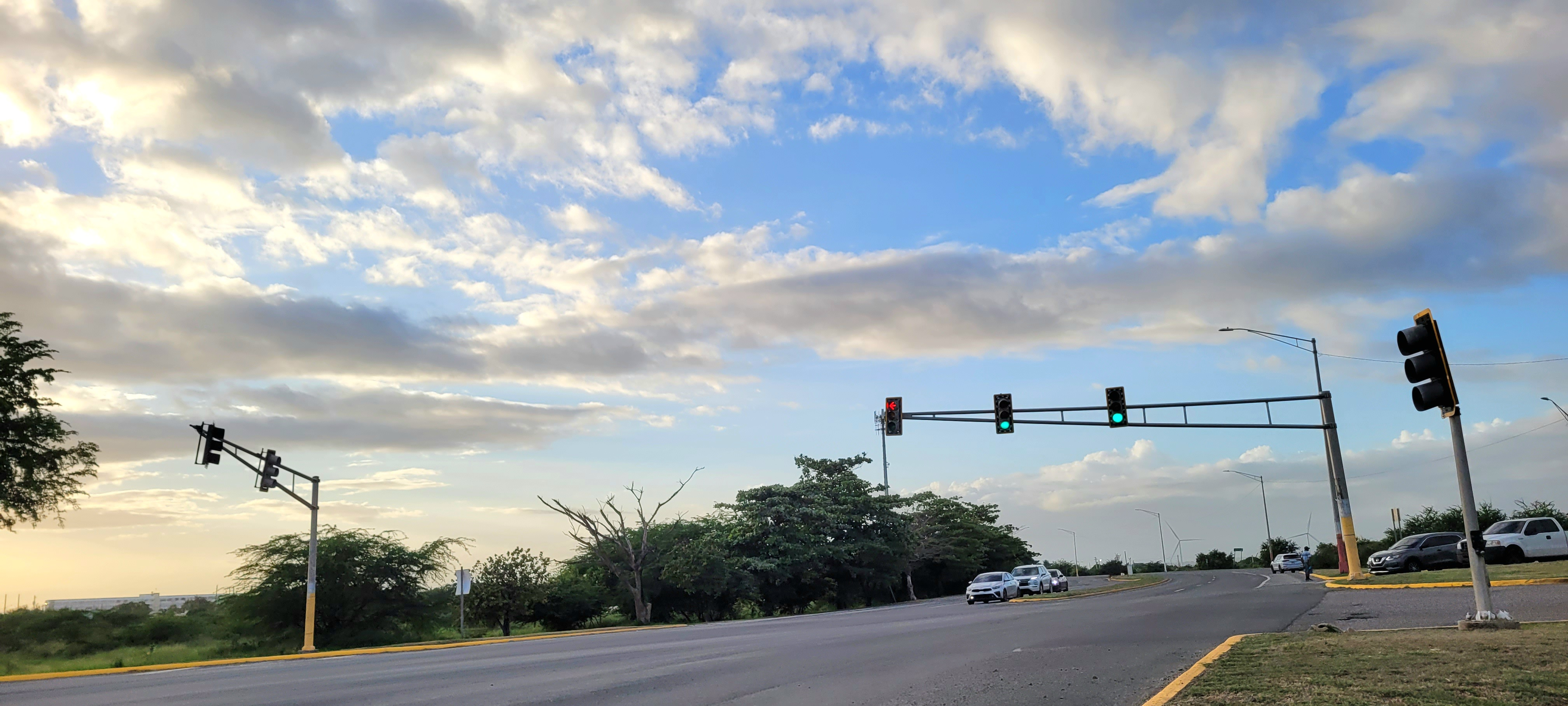
- Puerto Rico Highway 161 at Puerto Rico Highway 153 junction between Santa Isabel barrio-pueblo and Boca Velázquez

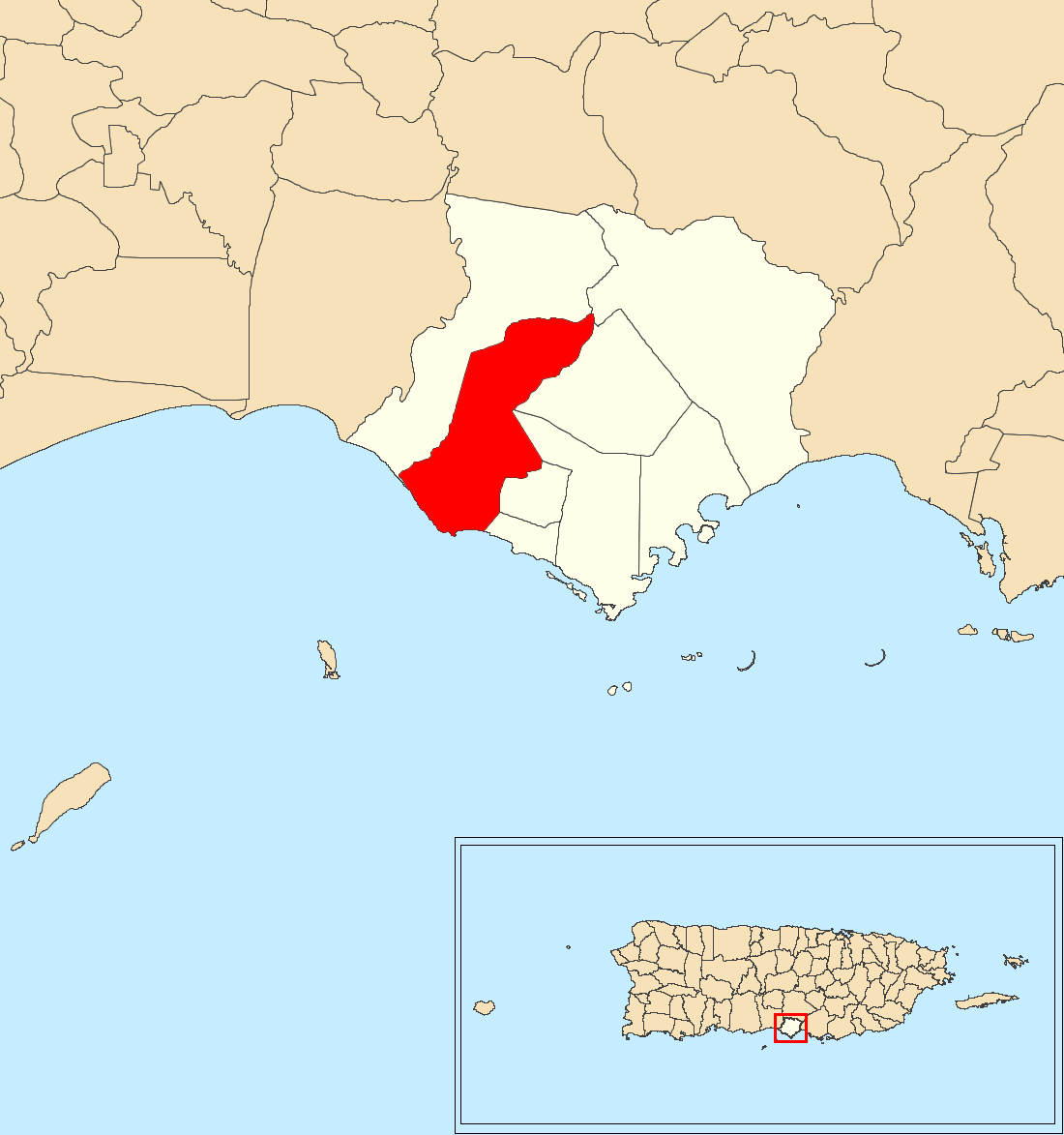
- Location of Boca Velázquez within the municipality of Santa Isabel shown in red

- Location of Puerto Rico
- Coordinates: 17°58′06″N 66°25′09″W
- Commonwealth: Puerto Rico
- Municipality: Santa Isabel

Area
  - Total: 8.75 sq mi (22.7 km^{2})
  - Land: 4.99 sq mi (12.9 km^{2})
  - Water: 3.76 sq mi (9.7 km^{2})
- Elevation: 13 ft (4.0 m)

Population (2010)
  - Total: 2,705
  - Density: 542.1/sq mi (209.3/km^{2})
- Source: 2010 Census
- Time zone: UTC−4 (AST)

Boca Velázquez is a barrio in the municipality of Santa Isabel, Puerto Rico. Its population in 2010 was 2,705.

== History ==
Boca Velázquez was in Spain's gazetteers until Puerto Rico was ceded by Spain in the aftermath of the Spanish–American War under the terms of the Treaty of Paris of 1898 and became an unincorporated territory of the United States. In 1899, the United States Department of War conducted a census of Puerto Rico finding that the combined population of Boca Velázquez and Descalabrado barrios was 1,083.

Historical population
Census	Pop.	Note	%±
1910	876		—
1920	877		0.1%
1930	868		−1.0%
1940	1,319		52.0%
1950	1,357		2.9%
1960	917		−32.4%
1970	1,192		30.0%
1980	1,221		2.4%
1990	1,796		47.1%
2000	2,279		26.9%
2010	2,705		18.7%
U.S. Decennial Census; 1900 (N/A) 1910-1930; 1930-1950 1980-2000 2010

== See also ==
- List of communities in Puerto Rico
