= Felicia 2 =

Barrio of Santa Isabel, Puerto Rico

- Barrio
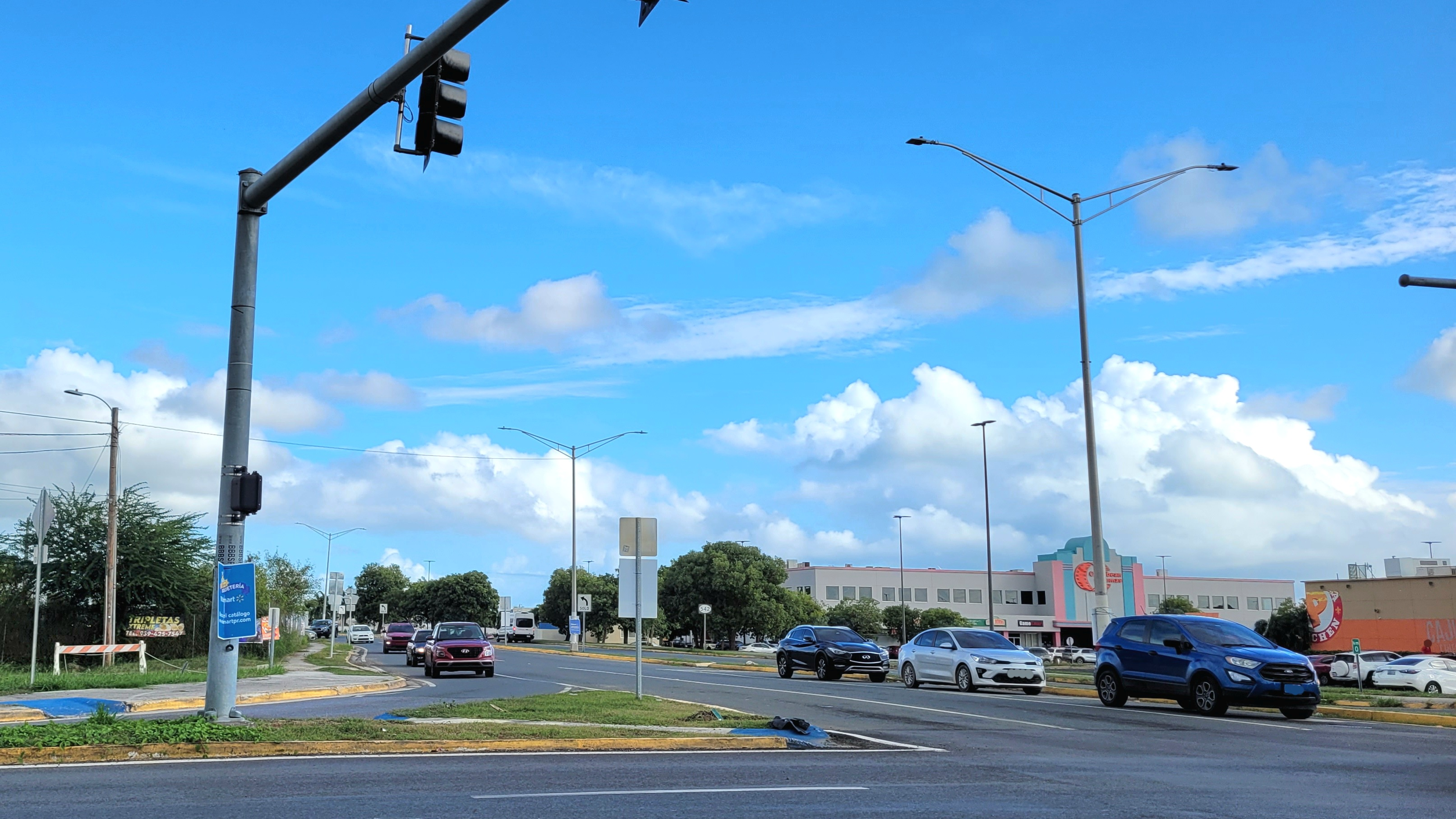
- Puerto Rico Highway 542 in Felicia 2

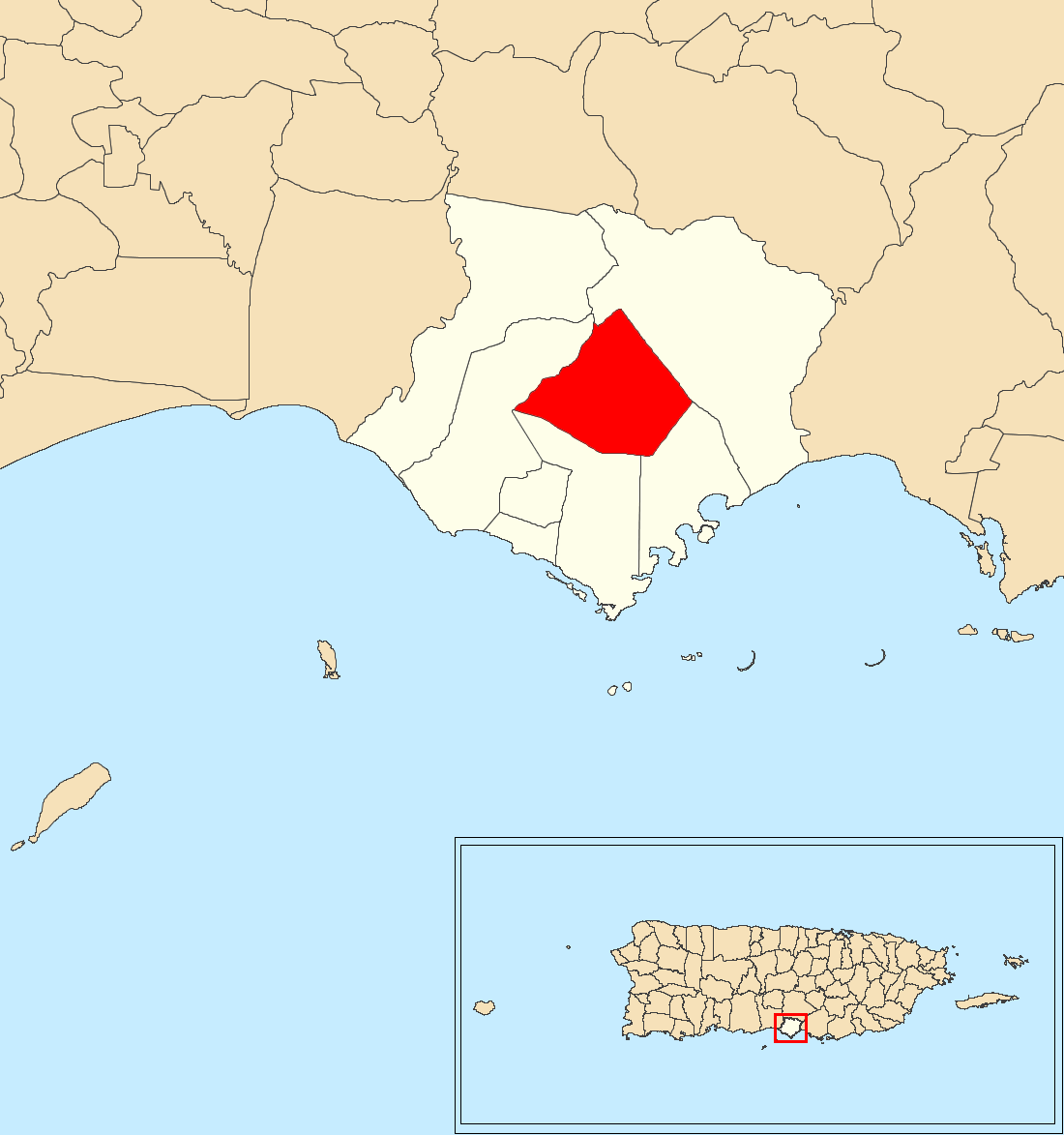
- Location of Felicia 2 within the municipality of Santa Isabel shown in red

- Location of Puerto Rico
- Coordinates: 17°59′37″N 66°23′13″W
- Commonwealth: Puerto Rico
- Municipality: Santa Isabel

Area
  - Total: 3.77 sq mi (9.8 km^{2})
  - Land: 3.75 sq mi (9.7 km^{2})
  - Water: 0.02 sq mi (0.052 km^{2})
- Elevation: 85 ft (26 m)

Population (2010)
  - Total: 3,230
  - Density: 861.3/sq mi (332.5/km^{2})
- Source: 2010 Census
- Time zone: UTC−4 (AST)

Felicia 2 is a barrio in the municipality of Santa Isabel, Puerto Rico. Its population in 2010 was 3,230.

== History ==
Felicia 2 was in Spain's gazetteers until Puerto Rico was ceded by Spain in the aftermath of the Spanish–American War under the terms of the Treaty of Paris of 1898 and became an unincorporated territory of the United States. In 1899, the United States Department of War conducted a census of Puerto Rico finding that the combined population of Felicia 2 and Felicia 1 barrios was 1,130.

Historical population
Census	Pop.	Note	%±
1910	541		—
1920	778		43.8%
1930	884		13.6%
1940	1,307		47.9%
1950	1,580		20.9%
1960	1,260		−20.3%
1970	1,421		12.8%
1980	1,984		39.6%
1990	1,878		−5.3%
2000	1,889		0.6%
2010	3,230		71.0%
U.S. Decennial Census; 1900 (N/A) 1910-1930; 1930-1950 1980-2000 2010

== See also ==
- List of communities in Puerto Rico
