= Playa, Santa Isabel, Puerto Rico =

Barrio of Puerto Rico

Playa
- Barrio
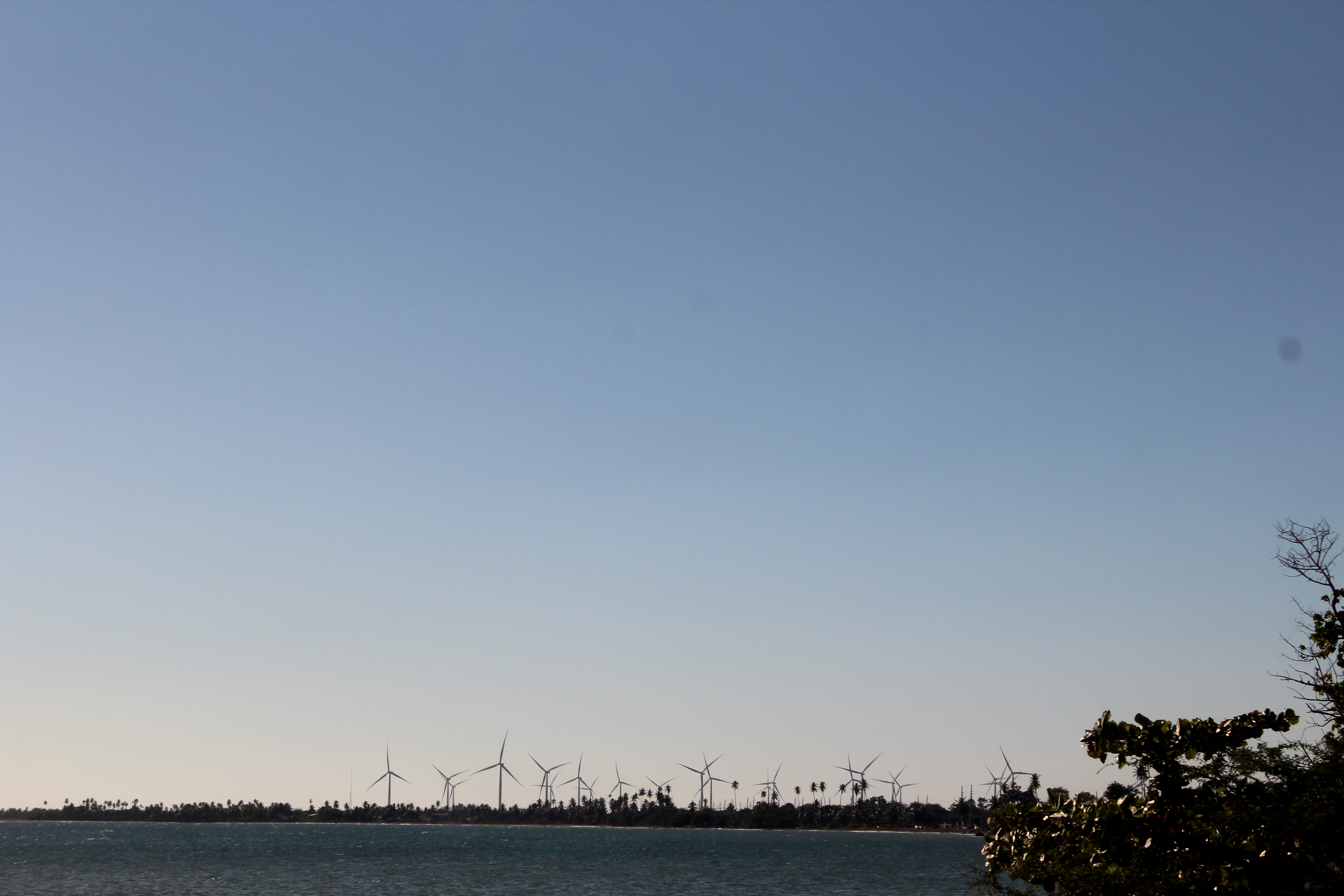
- Rincón Bay in Playa

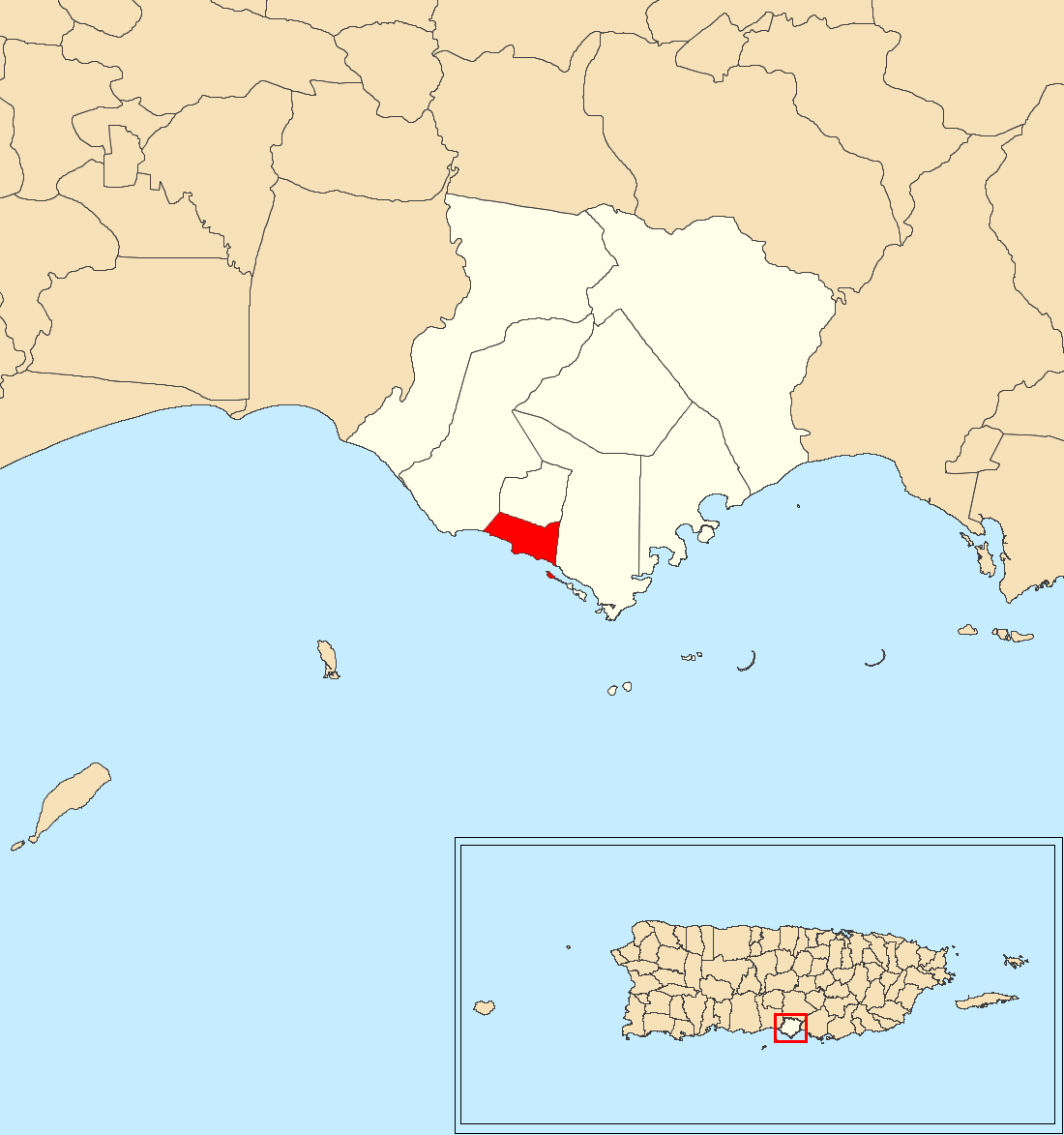
- Location of Playa within the municipality of Santa Isabel shown in red

- Location of Puerto Rico
- Coordinates: 17°57′13″N 66°24′20″W
- Commonwealth: Puerto Rico
- Municipality: Santa Isabel

Area
  - Total: 1.28 sq mi (3.3 km^{2})
  - Land: 0.58 sq mi (1.5 km^{2})
  - Water: 0.70 sq mi (1.8 km^{2})
- Elevation: 10 ft (3.0 m)

Population (2010)
  - Total: 807
  - Density: 1,391.4/sq mi (537.2/km^{2})
- Source: 2010 Census
- Time zone: UTC−4 (AST)

Playa Barrio is a barrio in the municipality of Santa Isabel, Puerto Rico. Its population in 2010 was 807.

== History ==
Playa was in Spain's gazetteers until Puerto Rico was ceded by Spain in the aftermath of the Spanish–American War under the terms of the Treaty of Paris of 1898 and became an unincorporated territory of the United States. In 1899, the United States Department of War conducted a census of Puerto Rico finding that the combined population of Playa and Santa Isabel barrio-pueblo barrios was 1,142.

Historical population
Census	Pop.	Note	%±
1910	200		—
1920	340		70.0%
1930	522		53.5%
1940	725		38.9%
1950	586		−19.2%
1960	544		−7.2%
1970	849		56.1%
1980	993		17.0%
1990	767		−22.8%
2000	840		9.5%
2010	807		−3.9%
U.S. Decennial Census; 1900 (N/A) 1910-1930; 1930-1950 1980-2000 2010

== See also ==
- List of communities in Puerto Rico
