= Santa Isabel, Puerto Rico =

Town and municipality in Puerto Rico

Santa Isabel Municipio Autónomo de Santa Isabel
- Town and Municipality
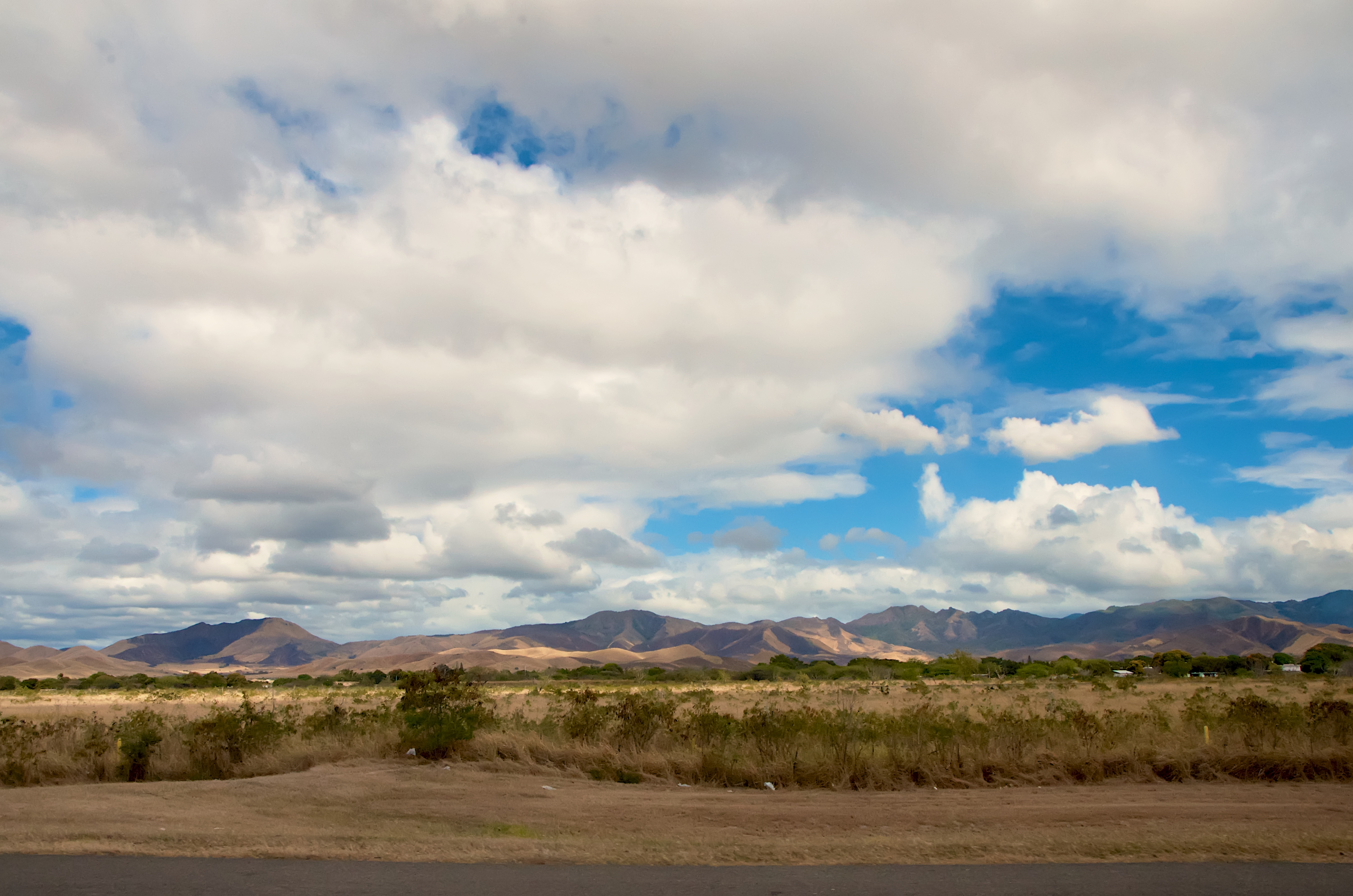
- Skyline of Jauca 2 barrio in Santa Isabel

- Flag Coat of arms
- Nicknames: Tierra de Campeones, La Ciudad de los Potros; Capital de la Agricultura
- Anthem: "En un pedazo del sur estás presente"
- Map of Puerto Rico highlighting Santa Isabel Municipality
- Coordinates: 17°57′58″N 66°24′18″W
- Sovereign state: United States
- Commonwealth: Puerto Rico
- Settled: 1801
- Founded: October 5, 1842
- Founder: Don Juan de la Cruz, and Antonio Vélez
- Named for: Saint Isabelle of France
- Barrios: 8 barrios: Boca Velázquez; Descalabrado; Felicia 1; Felicia 2; Jauca 1; Jauca 2; Playa; Santa Isabel barrio-pueblo

Government
  - Mayor: Meldwin Rivera Rodríguez (PNP)
  - Senatorial dist.: 6 - Guayama
  - Representative dist.: 27

Area
  - Total: 34.3 sq mi (88.9 km^{2})

Population (2020)
  - Total: 20,281
  - Estimate (2025): 19,547 ▼
  - Rank: 60th in Puerto Rico
  - Density: 591/sq mi (228/km^{2})
- Demonym: Santaisabelinos
- Time zone: UTC−4 (AST)
- ZIP Code: 00757
- Area code: 787/939

Santa Isabel (Spanish pronunciation: [ˈsantajsaˈβel]) is a town and municipality of Puerto Rico located in the southern coast of the island, south of Coamo; east of Juana Díaz; and west of Salinas. Santa Isabel is spread over 7 barrios and Santa Isabel Pueblo (the downtown area and the administrative center). It is the principal city of the Santa Isabel Micropolitan Statistical Area and is part of the Ponce-Yauco-Coamo Combined Statistical Area.

Santa Isabel is known as The Capital of Agriculture, La Ciudad de los Potros ("City of Colts") due to the number of potreros (or racehorse stud farms) in the area.

== History ==
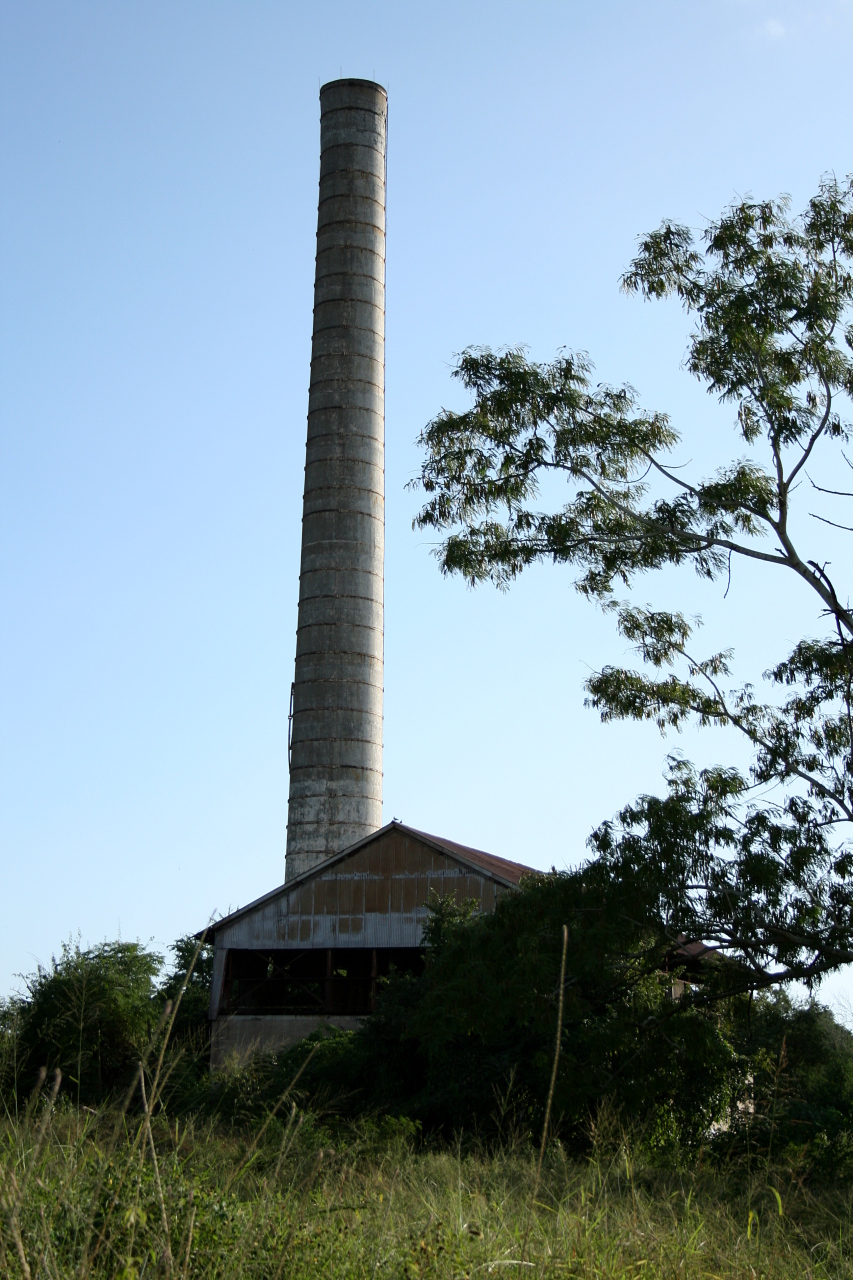
Relic of the old sugar processing plant, Central Cortada, in Santa Isabel

Before being founded, the area where Santa Isabel is located today was part of the boundary between the cacicazgos (or Taíno regions) of Guaynia and Guayama. During the Spanish conquest and settlement of Borinquen, the area became key to the settlement and agriculture of Coamo which at the time was the second town to be founded in the southern part of the island. Numerous estancias were established in the region during the time to cultivate "frutos menores" or small crops for local use such as rice, corn, beans and root vegetables. The area where Central Cortada is located was originally called Estancia Descalabrado, and was owned by Catalan settler Juan de Quintana from 1737.

The municipality of Santa Isabel was officially founded on October 5, 1842, by Antonio Vélez. Vélez led a group of residents to obtain independence from the municipality of Coamo, which Santa Isabel was originally a part of.

Puerto Rico was ceded by Spain in the aftermath of the Spanish–American War under the terms of the Treaty of Paris of 1898 and became a territory of the United States. In 1899, the United States conducted its first census of Puerto Rico finding that the population of Santa Isabel was 4,858.

On September 20, 2017 Hurricane Maria struck the island of Puerto Rico. In Santa Isabel, close to 500 people had to be rescued, the agriculture was leveled. The strong winds, 15 inches of rain, and rivers that crested, caused an estimated 12,000 homes to be completely or partially destroyed.

== Geography ==
Santa Isabel is on the southern coast.

- Aguirre State Forest (Punta Petrona Nature Reserve)
- Rivers: Cayures, Coamo, Descalabrado and Jueyes.

=== Barrios ===
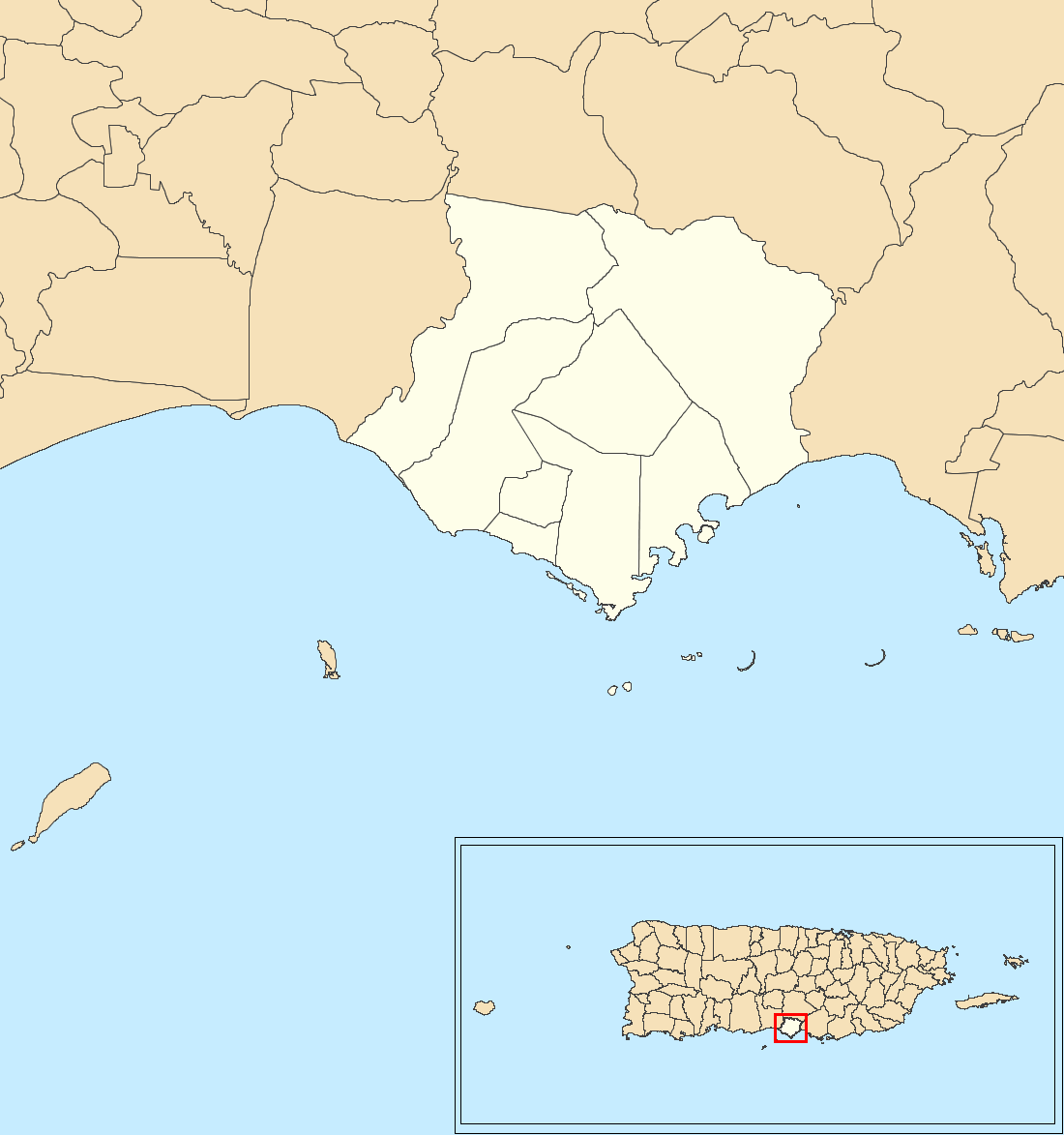
Subdivisions of Santa Isabel.

Like all municipalities of Puerto Rico, Santa Isabel is subdivided into barrios. The municipal buildings, central square and large Catholic church are located in a barrio referred to as "el pueblo".

1. Boca Velázquez
2. Descalabrado
3. Felicia 1
4. Felicia 2
5. Jauca 1
6. Jauca 2
7. Playa
8. Santa Isabel barrio-pueblo

=== Sectors ===
Barrios (which are like minor civil divisions) and subbarrios, are further subdivided into smaller areas called sectores (sectors in English). The types of sectores may vary, from normally sector to urbanización to reparto to barriada to residencial, among others.

=== Special Communities ===
Comunidades Especiales de Puerto Rico (Special Communities of Puerto Rico) are marginalized communities whose citizens are experiencing a certain amount of social exclusion. A map shows these communities occur in nearly every municipality of the commonwealth. Of the 742 places that were on the list in 2014, the following barrios, communities, sectors, or neighborhoods were in Santa Isabel: Playita Cortada, Sector Islote, Sector Canta Sapo, Sector Descalabrado, Sector El Río, Sector Florida, Sector la Pica, Sector Villa Pote, and Sector Villa Pulga (Villa del Mar).

== Demographics ==
Historical population
| Census | Pop. | Note | %± |
|---|---|---|---|
| 1900 | 4,858 | | — |
| 1910 | 6,959 | | 43.2% |
| 1920 | 7,257 | | 4.3% |
| 1930 | 8,886 | | 22.4% |
| 1940 | 11,468 | | 29.1% |
| 1950 | 13,478 | | 17.5% |
| 1960 | 14,542 | | 7.9% |
| 1970 | 16,056 | | 10.4% |
| 1980 | 19,854 | | 23.7% |
| 1990 | 19,318 | | −2.7% |
| 2000 | 21,665 | | 12.1% |
| 2010 | 23,274 | | 7.4% |
| 2020 | 20,281 | | −12.9% |
| 2025 (est.) | 19,547 | ▼ | −3.6% |
U.S. Decennial Census; 1899 (shown as 1900) 1910-1930; 1930-1950 1960-2000 2010 2020

As of the 2020 United States Decennial Census, Santa Isabel had a population of 20,281 residents, a decrease from the 2010 Census when the population was of 23,274 residents. In 2020, the racial makeup of the municipality was 50.2% White, 33.3% Black, 13.4% two or more races, and 0.1% Native American. The majority of the population, 99.8%, are Hispanic or Latino of any race, and 0.2% are non-Hispanic White residents.

== Tourism ==
=== Landmarks and places of interest ===
There are 29 beaches in Santa Isabel. Some of the main attractions of Santa Isabel are:

- El Malecón (boardwalk)
- Indian Museum
- Jauca Beach
- Hacienda Alomar Ruins
- Central Cortada (Cortada Sugarcane Refinery)

Santa Isabel has three listings in the United States National Register of Historic Places:

- Dr. Martin G. Brumbaugh Graded School
- Iglesia Evangélica Unida de Santa Isabel (inscribed as Iglesia Cristiana)
- Las Tres Haciendas irrigation system

== Economy ==
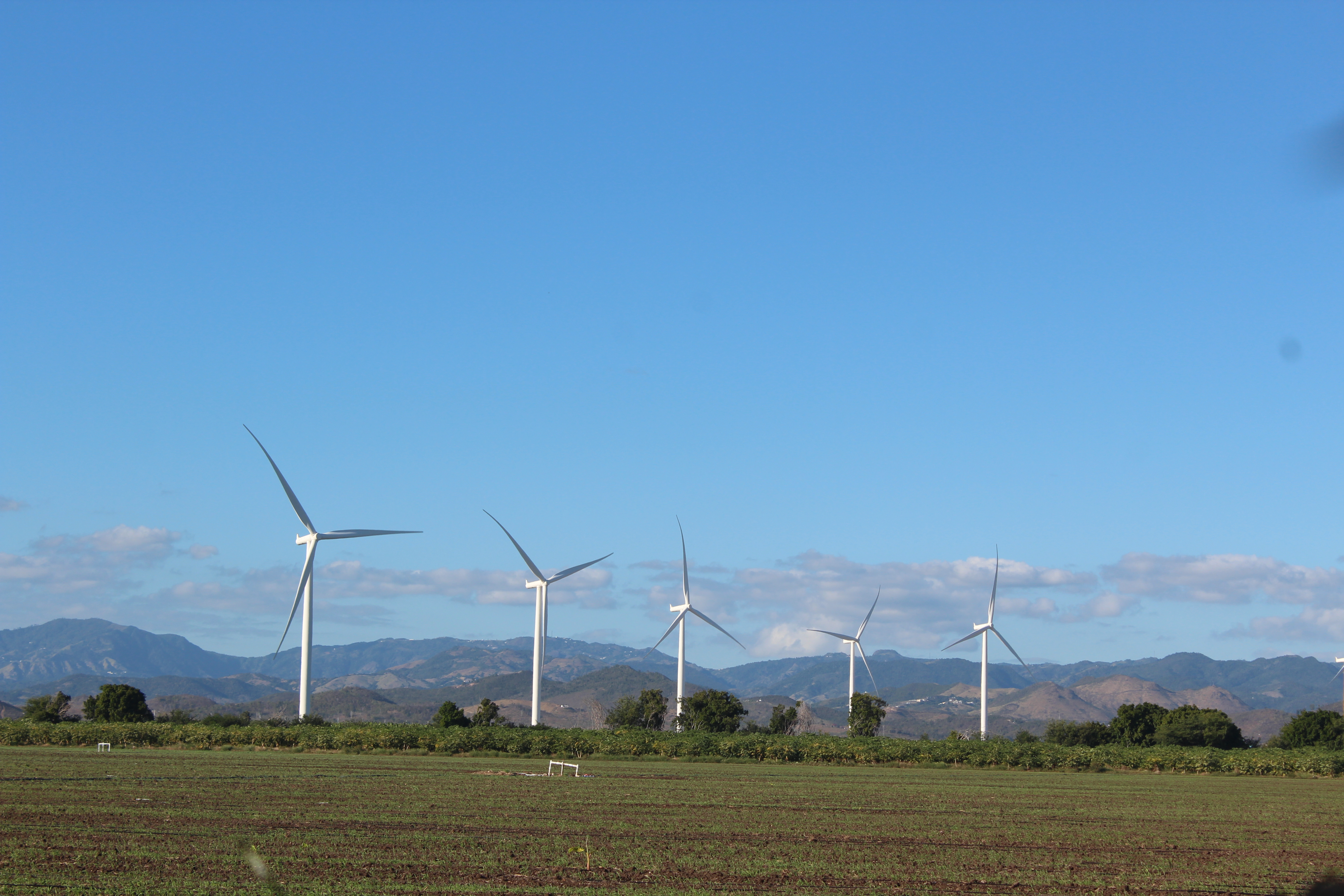
Crops in Felicia, Santa Isabel.

=== Agriculture ===
The surrounding areas produces fruits and vegetables such as mango, guineo and avocado. Campo Fresco, a Puerto Rican company, owns a plant in Santa Isabel, from where they produce Jugos Lotus juice and other drink brands.

=== Industry ===
Aerospace, electrical and electronic, metal products and nutritional products.

== Culture ==
=== Festivals and Events ===
Santa Isabel celebrates its patron saint festival in July. The Fiestas Patronales de Santiago Apostol is a religious and cultural celebration that generally features parades, games, artisans, amusement rides, regional food, and live entertainment.

Other festivals and events celebrated in Santa Isabel include:

- Agroferia Santa Isabel - April
- Carnaval de Baloncesto Barrio Ollas - July
- City Foundation Anniversary - October
- Encendido Navideño Barriada Felicia, Calle Elifaz Ostolaza - November

== Schools ==
=== Elementary ===
- Escuela Martín G. Brumbaugh
- Escuela John F. Kennedy
- Escuela Esther Rivera
- Escuela Ana L. Rosa Tricoche
- Escuela Apolonia Valentín
- Escuela Ana Valldejuly
- Escuela Emilio Casas

=== Middle school ===
- Escuela Manuel Martín Monserrate

=== High school ===
- Escuela Elvira M. Colón

=== Second Units ===
- Escuela S.U. Pedro Meléndez (Playita Cortada)

=== Private Education ===
- Colegio Evangélico Fuente De Sabiduría (K-6)
- Colegio LOGOS

== Sports ==
Santa Isabel is known as Tierra de Campeones (Land of Champions) because of its rich sports tradition (especially in Baseball). The city is home to the Santa Isabel Potros baseball team. The Potros won the 1992 National Championship of the Federación de Béisbol Aficionado de Puerto Rico. The team plays its home games at Estadio Municipal Luis Guillermo Moreno.

- Class A Baseball Teams (Wild Passages of Paso Seco, Marlins de Felicia and Jueueros de Jauca)
- Double A Baseball Team (Ponies of Santa Isabel)
- Basketball Carnival (Ollas neighborhood) - July
- Interbarrio Children's Basketball League - August–November
- Double A Youth Baseball Team (Potritos U19)
- Soccer Teams (Santa Isabel Soccer Club)
- Collegiate Volleyball (UAGM Santa Isabel)

== Government ==
All municipalities in Puerto Rico are administered by a mayor, elected every four years. The current mayor of Santa Isabel is Meldwin Rivera Rodríguez, of the New Progressive Party (PNP). He was first elected at the 2024 general elections.

The city belongs to the Puerto Rico Senatorial district VI, which is represented by two Senators. In 2024, Rafael Santos Ortiz and Wilmer Reyes Berríos were elected as District Senators.

== Transportation ==
There are 12 bridges in Santa Isabel.

== Symbols ==
The municipio has an official flag and coat of arms.

=== Flag ===
The flag is divided horizontally into three stripes; white at the top, yellow in the center and red at the bottom, and may be decorated with sugarcane stems.

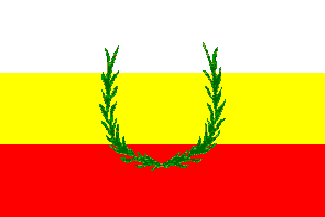
Alternate flag of Santa Isabel with sugar cane stem ornamentation

=== Coat of arms ===
The crown stands for Saint-Queen Elizabeth of Hungary (Isabel in Spanish), patroness of the Third Order of Saint Francis. The shells are a symbol of St. James the patron saint of the town, as well as for the many shells found in the beaches near the town.

== Notable Santaisabelinos ==
- Adolfo L. Monserrate Anselmi - former member Puerto Rico House of Representatives
- Benito Santiago - Baseball player; won unanimously the 1986 the National League Rookie of the Year Award with the San Diego Padres.
- Melwin Cedeño - Actor, comedian, kids host, Merengue musician, and singer.
- Carlos Colón Sr. - professional wrestler known as El Acróbata de Puerto Rico. Co-owner (vice-president) of the World Wrestling Council (WWC), formerly known as Capital Sports Promotions. Former WWE wrestler when he entered the 1993 WWF Royal Rumble. Inducted into the WWE Hall Of Fame in 2014.
- Carlos Correa - Baseball player; First Overall Pick in the 2012 MLB Draft, 2015 American League Rookie Of The Year, Shortstop for the Minnesota Twins. Formerly played for the Houston Astros where he won an MLB World Series championship for the team in 2017.
- José Guzmán - Former professional Baseball pitcher for the Texas Rangers.

== Gallery ==
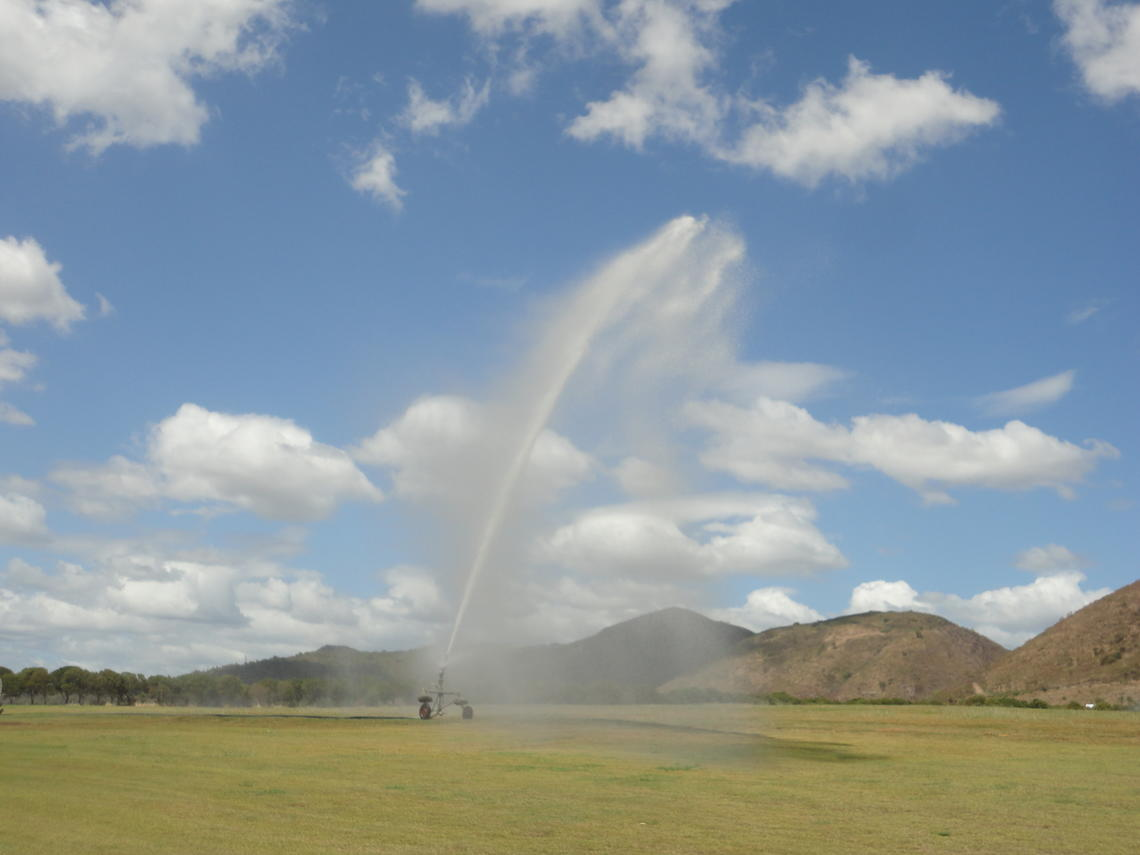
Irrigation method in Santa Isabel

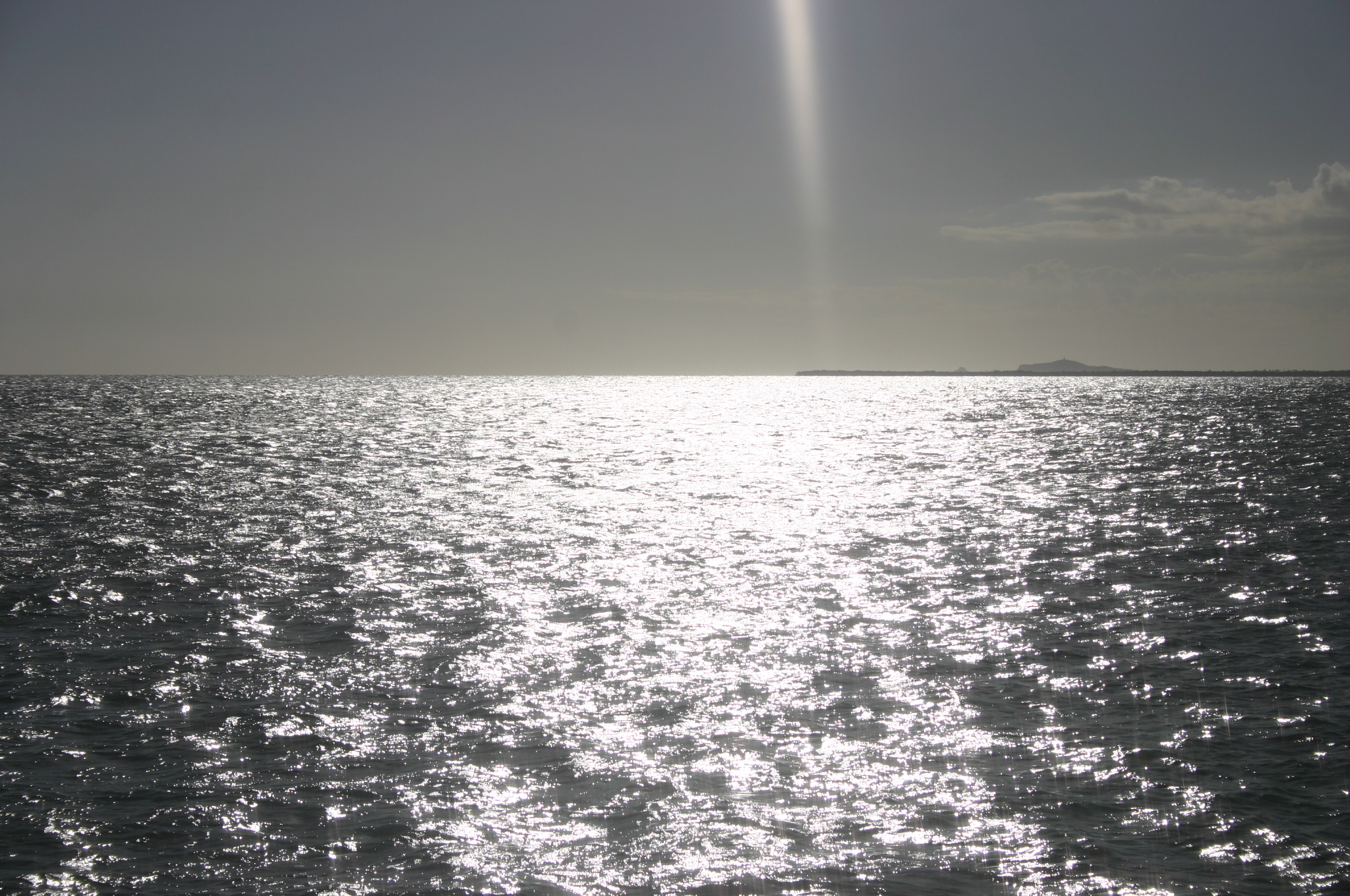
View of Caribbean Sea from Santa Isabel

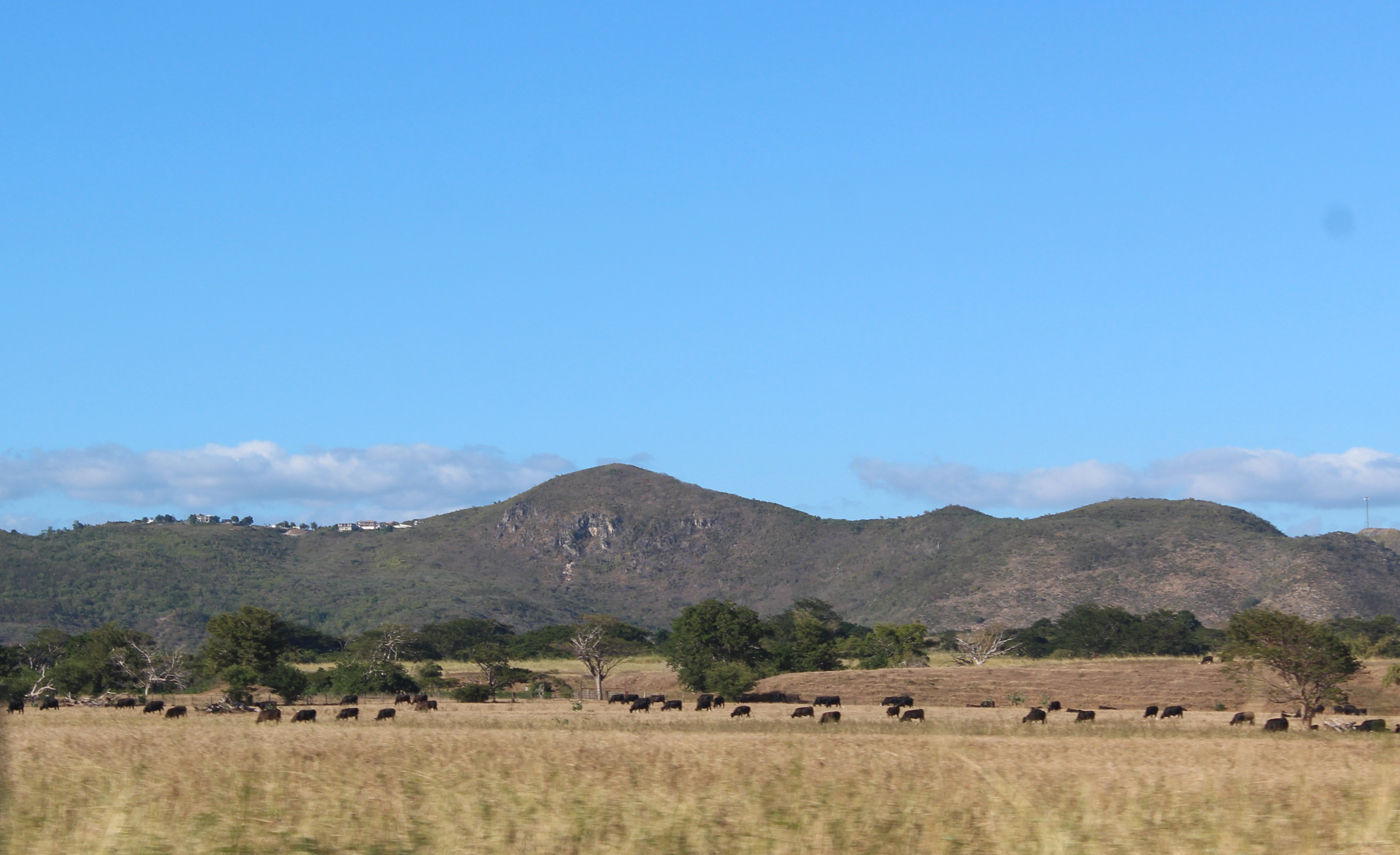
Cattle in Jauca.

== See also ==
- List of Puerto Ricans
- History of Puerto Rico
- Did you know-Puerto Rico?
