= Jueyes River =

River of Puerto Rico

Coordinates: 17.9769106°N 66.3382242°W

Río Jueyes

Location
- Commonwealth: Puerto Rico

The Río Jueyes is a river of Puerto Rico.

== See also ==
- List of rivers of Puerto Rico
