= Felicia 1 =

Barrio of Santa Isabel, Puerto Rico

- Barrio
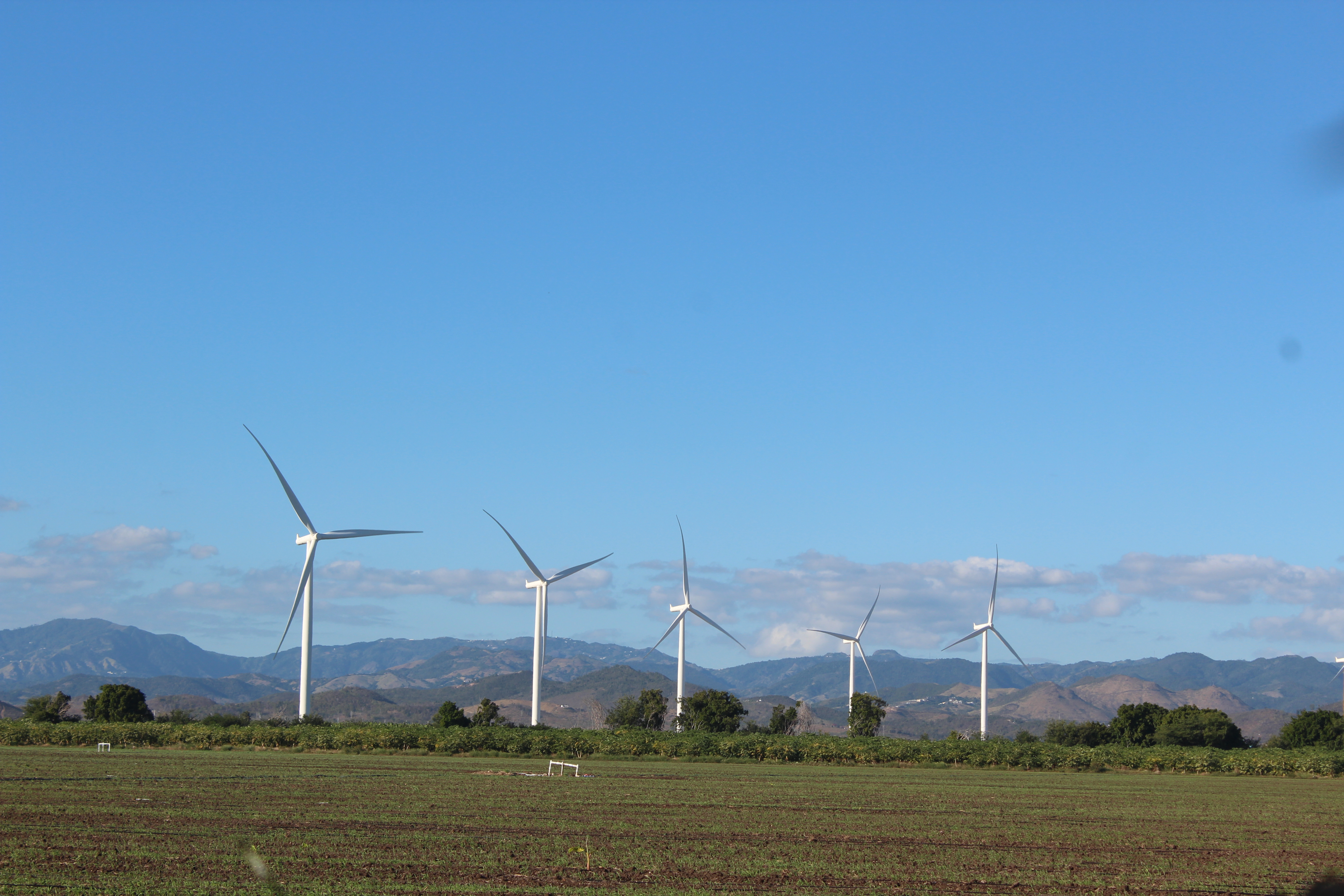

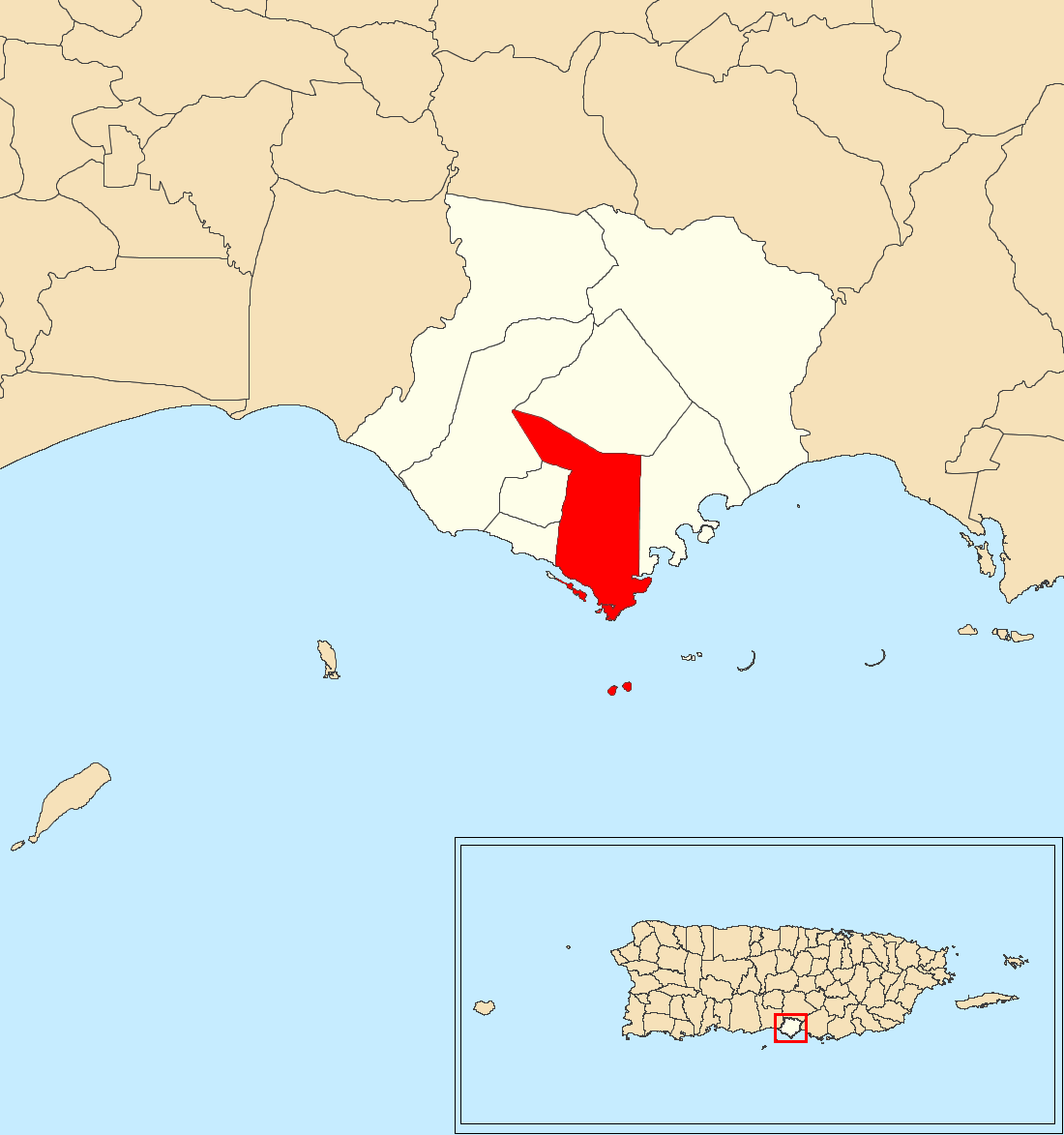
- Location of Felicia 1 within the municipality of Santa Isabel shown in red

- Location of Puerto Rico
- Coordinates: 17°57′18″N 66°23′24″W
- Commonwealth: Puerto Rico
- Municipality: Santa Isabel

Area
  - Total: 4.8 sq mi (12 km^{2})
  - Land: 3.6 sq mi (9.3 km^{2})
  - Water: 1.2 sq mi (3.1 km^{2})
- Elevation: 13 ft (4.0 m)

Population (2010)
  - Total: 530
  - Density: 147.2/sq mi (56.8/km^{2})
- Source: 2010 Census
- Time zone: UTC−4 (AST)

Felicia 1 is a barrio in the municipality of Santa Isabel, Puerto Rico. Its population in 2010 was 530.

== History ==
Felicia 1 was in Spain's gazetteers until Puerto Rico was ceded by Spain in the aftermath of the Spanish–American War under the terms of the Treaty of Paris of 1898 and became an unincorporated territory of the United States. In 1899, the United States Department of War conducted a census of Puerto Rico finding that the combined population of Felicia 1 and Felicia 2 barrios was 1,130.

Historical population
Census	Pop.	Note	%±
1910	1,260		—
1920	987		−21.7%
1930	1,093		10.7%
1940	1,327		21.4%
1950	669		−49.6%
1960	516		−22.9%
1970	440		−14.7%
1980	134		−69.5%
1990	224		67.2%
2000	362		61.6%
2010	530		46.4%
U.S. Decennial Census; 1900 (N/A) 1910-1930; 1930-1950 1980-2000 2010

== See also ==
- List of communities in Puerto Rico
