= Santa Isabel barrio-pueblo =

Historical and administrative center (seat) of Santa Isabel, Puerto Rico

Santa Isabel barrio-pueblo Pueblo de Santa Isabel
- Municipality Seat
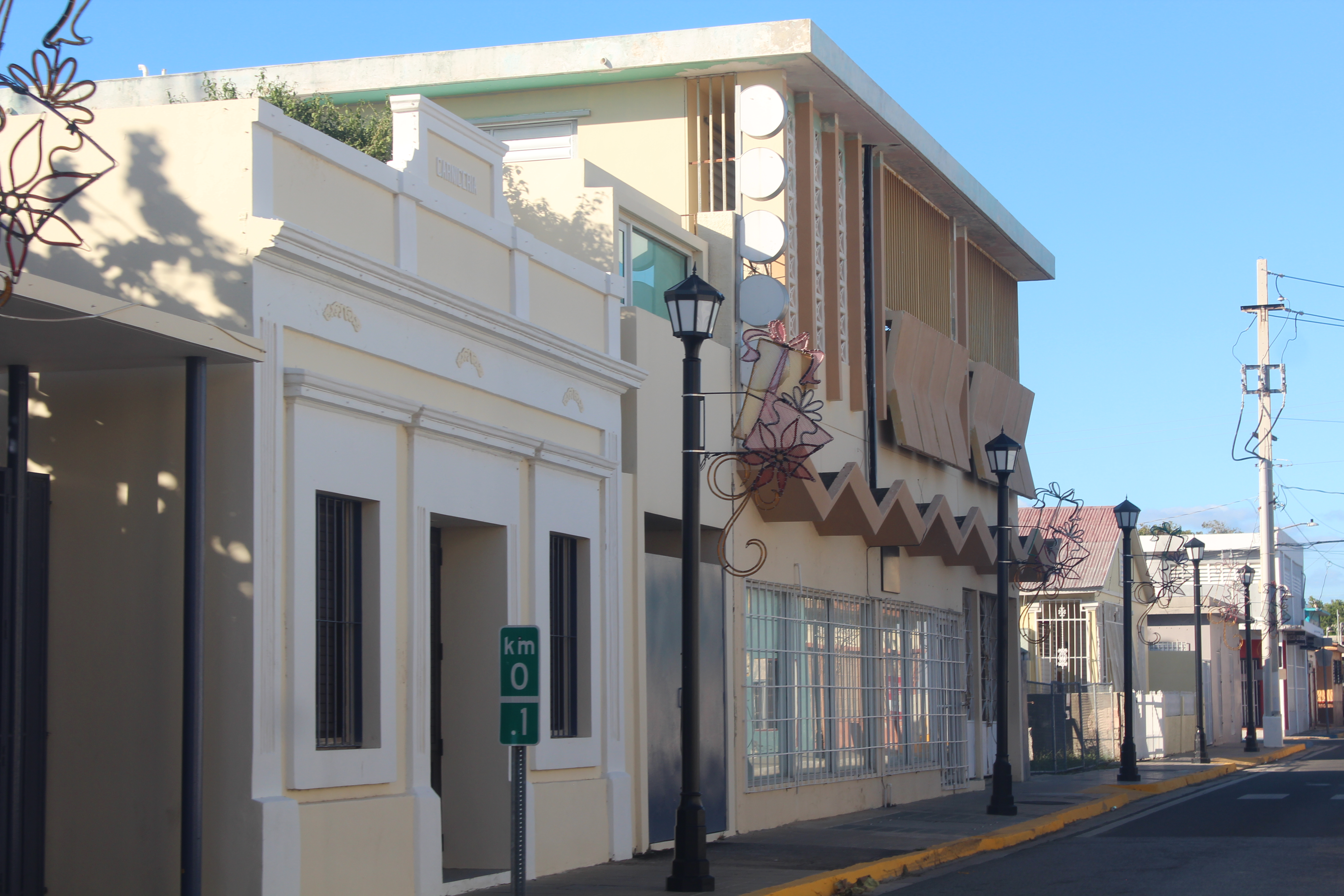
- Buildings in Santa Isabel barrio-pueblo

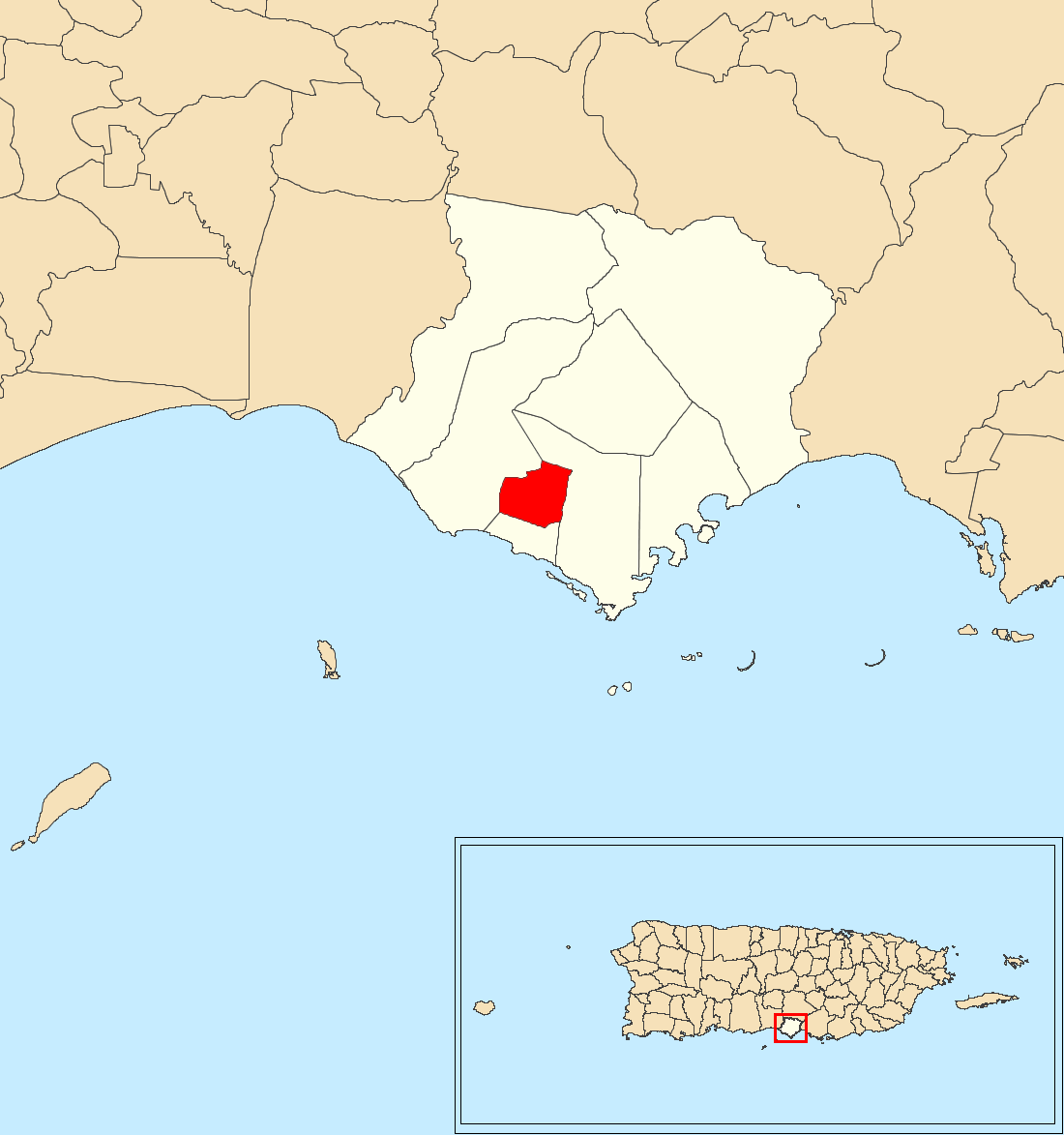
- Location of Santa Isabel barrio-pueblo within the municipality of Santa Isabel shown in red

- Location of Puerto Rico
- Coordinates: 17°58′08″N 66°24′18″W
- Commonwealth: Puerto Rico
- Municipality: Santa Isabel

Area
  - Total: 0.87 sq mi (2.3 km^{2})
  - Land: 0.87 sq mi (2.3 km^{2})
  - Water: 0 sq mi (0 km^{2})
- Elevation: 33 ft (10 m)

Population (2010)
  - Total: 5,133
  - Density: 5,900/sq mi (2,300/km^{2})
- Source: 2010 Census
- Time zone: UTC−4 (AST)

Santa Isabel barrio-pueblo is a barrio and the administrative center (seat) of Santa Isabel, a municipality of Puerto Rico. Its population in 2010 was 5,133.

Historical population
Census	Pop.	Note	%±
1910	1,200		—
1920	1,143		−4.7%
1930	1,586		38.8%
1940	2,348		48.0%
1950	4,117		75.3%
1960	4,712		14.5%
1970	4,495		−4.6%
1980	6,844		52.3%
1990	6,623		−3.2%
2000	6,335		−4.3%
2010	5,133		−19.0%
U.S. Decennial Census; 1900 (N/A) 1910-1930; 1930-1950 1980-2000 2010

As was customary in Spain, in Puerto Rico, the municipality has a barrio called pueblo which contains a central plaza, the municipal buildings (city hall), and a Catholic church. Fiestas patronales (patron saint festivals) are held in the central plaza every year.

== The central plaza and its church ==
The central plaza, or square, is a place for official and unofficial recreational events and a place where people can gather and socialize from dusk to dawn. The Laws of the Indies, Spanish law, which regulated life in Puerto Rico in the early 19th century, stated the plaza's purpose was for "the parties" (celebrations, festivities) (Spanish: a propósito para las fiestas), and that the square should be proportionally large enough for the number of neighbors (Spanish: grandeza proporcionada al número de vecinos). These Spanish regulations also stated that the streets nearby should be comfortable portals for passersby, protecting them from the elements: sun and rain.

Located across the central plaza in Santa Isabel barrio-pueblo is the (Church of Saint James the Apostle) Parroquia Santiago Apostol, a Roman Catholic church.

== History ==
Santa Isabel barrio-pueblo was in Spain's gazetteers until Puerto Rico was ceded by Spain in the aftermath of the Spanish–American War under the terms of the Treaty of Paris of 1898 and became an unincorporated territory of the United States. In 1899, the United States Department of War conducted a census of Puerto Rico finding that the combined population of Santa Isabel Pueblo and Playa barrios was 1,142.

== Gallery ==
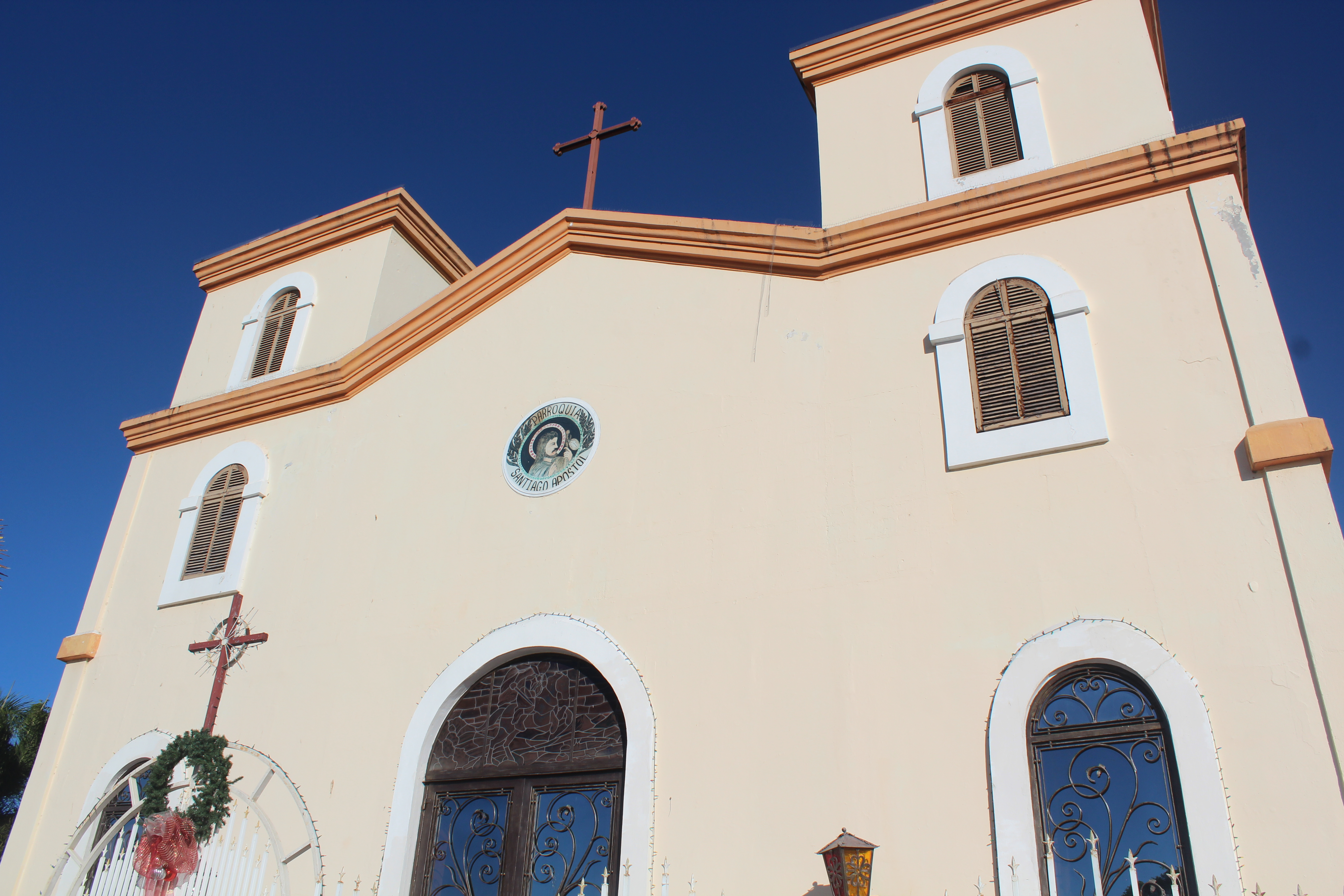
Church of St. James the Apostle (Parroquia de Santiago Apostol)

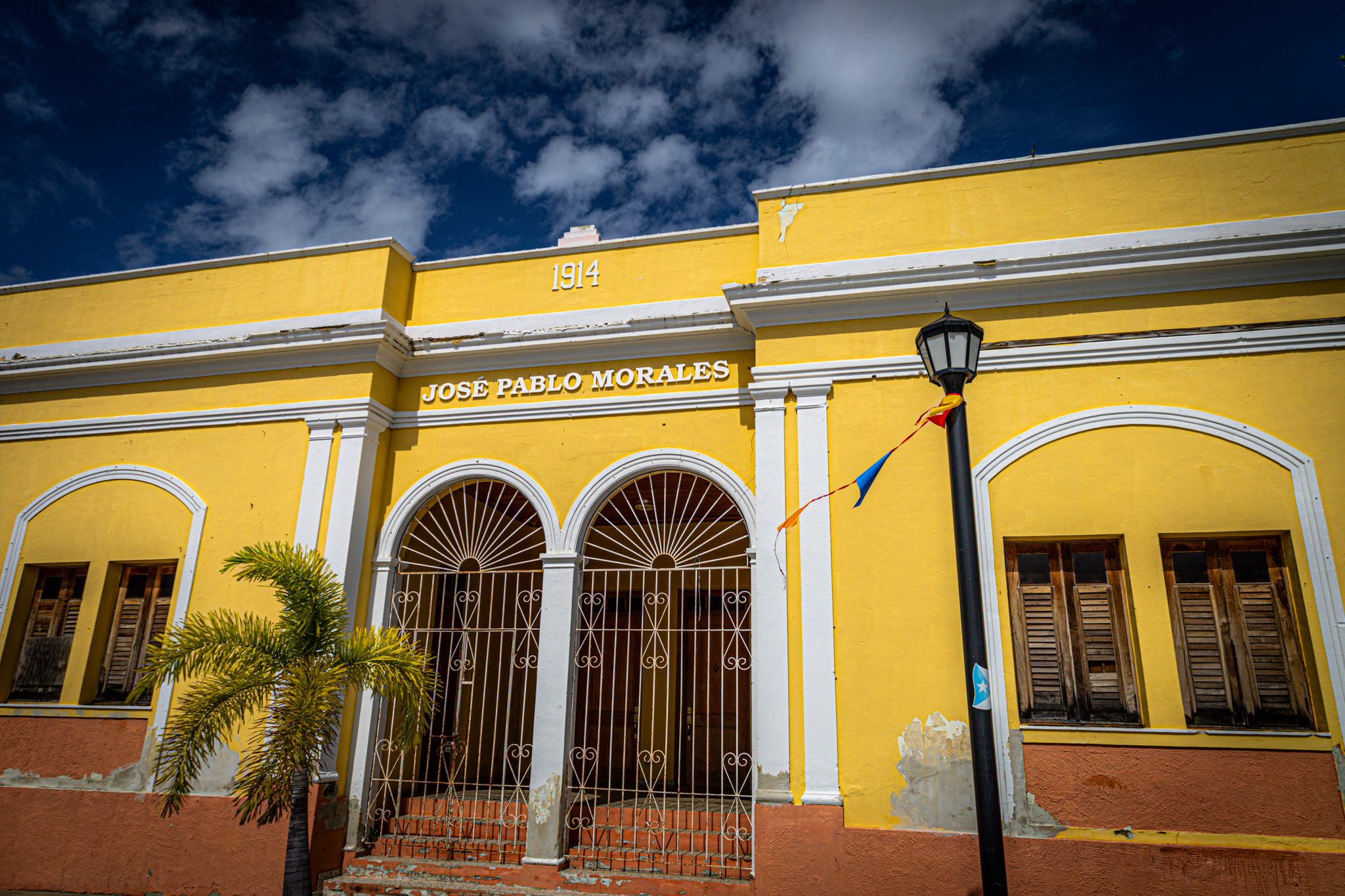
Former José Pablo Morales school building in the town square

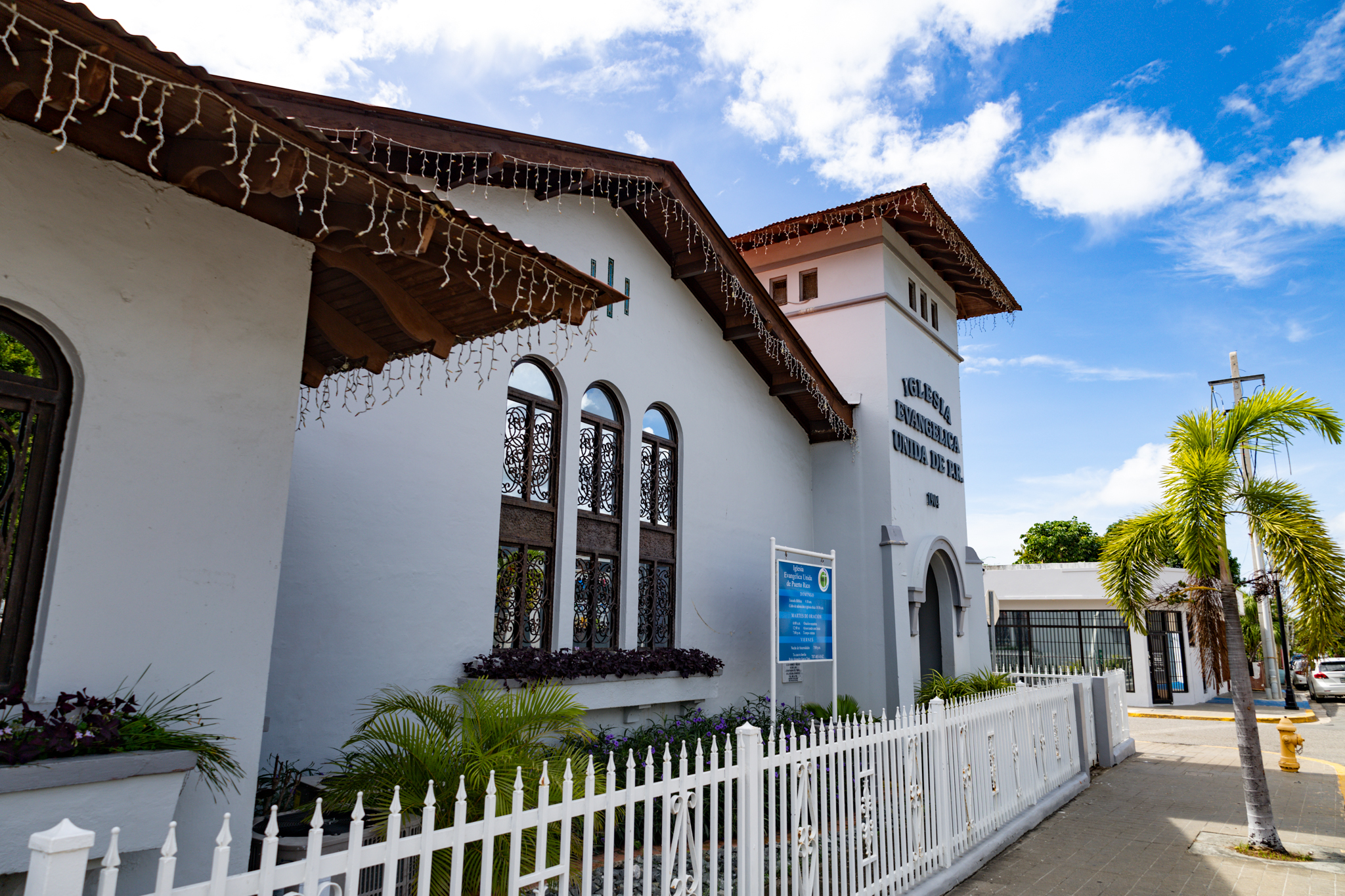
Iglesia Evangélica Unida de Santa Isabel

== See also ==
- List of communities in Puerto Rico
