= Jauca 2 =

Barrio of Santa Isabel, Puerto Rico

- Barrio
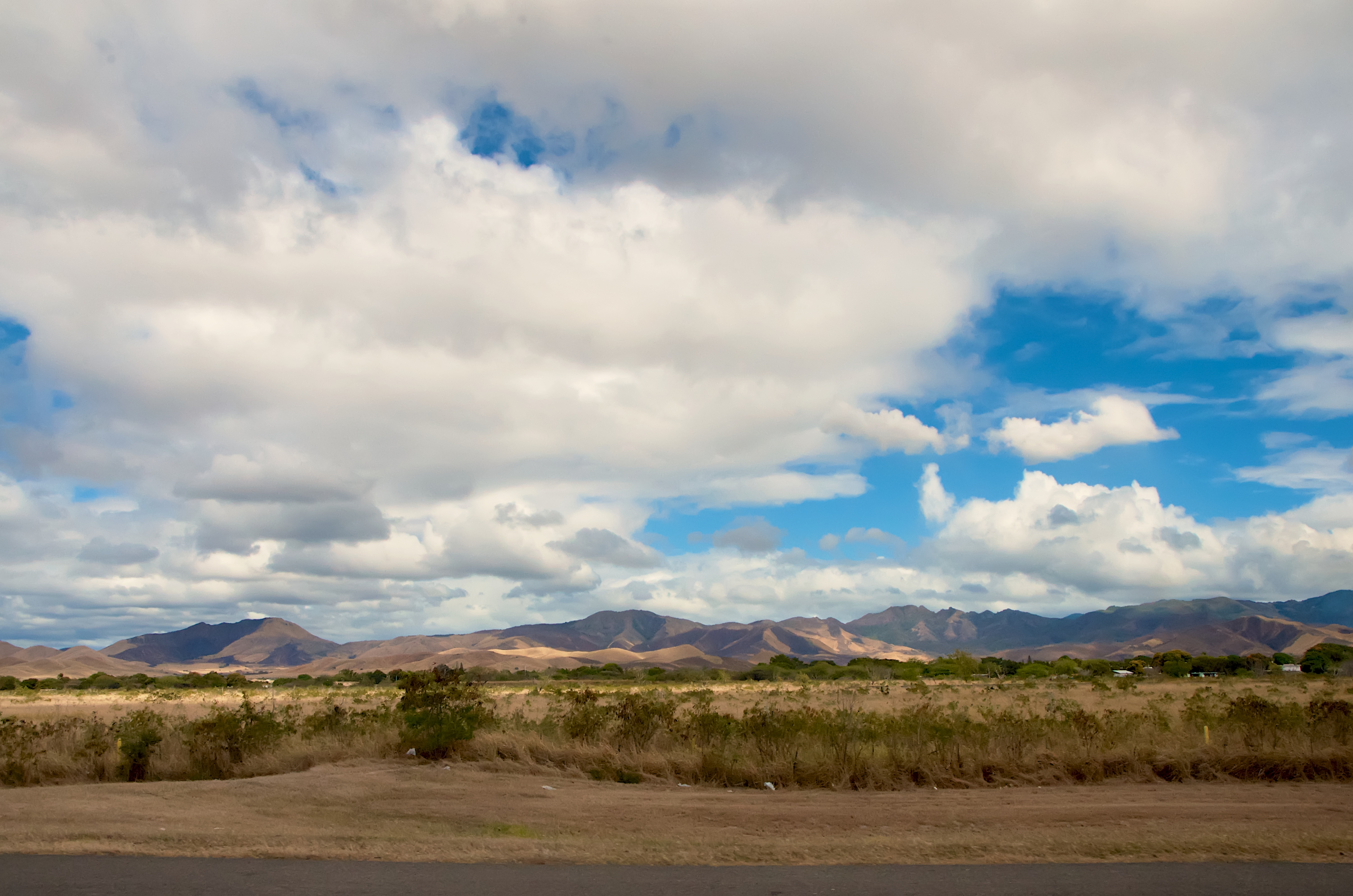
- Skyline of Jauca 2

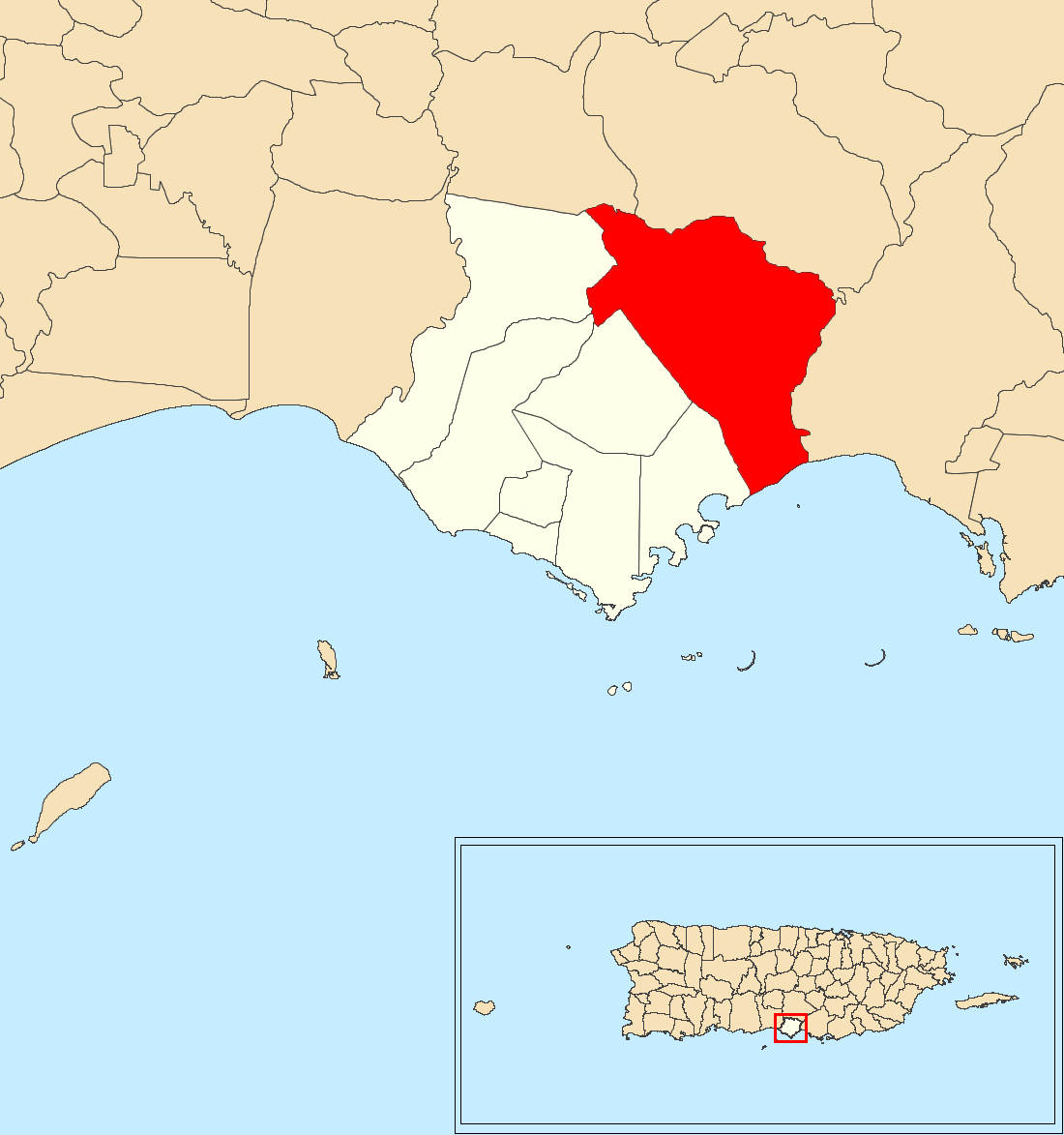
- Location of Jauca 2 within the municipality of Santa Isabel shown in red

- Location of Puerto Rico
- Coordinates: 18°00′20″N 66°21′31″W
- Commonwealth: Puerto Rico
- Municipality: Santa Isabel

Area
  - Total: 10.98 sq mi (28.4 km^{2})
  - Land: 10.16 sq mi (26.3 km^{2})
  - Water: 0.82 sq mi (2.1 km^{2})
- Elevation: 128 ft (39 m)

Population (2010)
  - Total: 4,554
  - Density: 448.7/sq mi (173.2/km^{2})
- Source: 2010 Census
- Time zone: UTC−4 (AST)

Jauca 2 is a barrio in the municipality of Santa Isabel, Puerto Rico. Its population in 2010 was 4,554.

== History ==
Jauca 2 was in Spain's gazetteers until Puerto Rico was ceded by Spain in the aftermath of the Spanish–American War under the terms of the Treaty of Paris of 1898 and became an unincorporated territory of the United States. In 1899, the United States Department of War conducted a census of Puerto Rico finding that the combined population of Jauca 2 and Jauca 1 barrios was 1,553.

Historical population
Census	Pop.	Note	%±
1910	682		—
1920	821		20.4%
1930	986		20.1%
1940	1,159		17.5%
1950	1,052		−9.2%
1960	1,384		31.6%
1970	1,384		0.0%
1980	1,745		26.1%
1990	1,687		−3.3%
2000	3,504		107.7%
2010	4,554		30.0%
U.S. Decennial Census; 1900 (N/A) 1910-1930; 1930-1950 1980-2000 2010

== See also ==
- List of communities in Puerto Rico
