= Puerto Rico Register of Historic Sites and Zones =

Puerto Rican government program

The Puerto Rico Register of Historic Sites and Zones (Spanish: Registro Nacional de Sitios y Zonas Históricas) is a Puerto Rican government program adopted by the state Planning Board (Junta de Planificación) for use by both private and public entities to evaluate, register, revitalize, develop or protect the built historic and cultural heritage of Puerto Rico in the context and for economic planning and land use zoning.

There is an overlap between the Register of Historic Sites and Zones and the federal National Register of Historic Places (Registro Nacional de Lugares Históricos), however, properties can be listed in the former and not in the latter and vice versa. Properties inscribed in the register can be either individual sites or historic districts (zonas históricas) consisting of multiple structures, buildings, and sites. As of 2024, there are more than 260 sites and historic districts listed in the Puerto Rico Register of Historic Sites and Zones. Sites can be listed in the register through legal codification by either the Puerto Rico Planning Board, the Puerto Rico State Historic Preservation Office or the Financial Advisory Authority and Fiscal Agency of Puerto Rico through a Real Property Evaluation and Disposition Committee which has been in place since 2023.

== List ==
The following is a list of properties that are listed on the Puerto Rico Register of Historic Sites and Zones but not on the National Register of Historic Places. Names are given as registered.

Name	Image	Municipality	Resolution number	Designation date	Description
Antigua Casa Parroquial		Camuy	59-2019	June 29, 2019	Former clergy house to the San José parish church (the main town church of Camuy) dating to the 1920s, built at the site of a former town jail, today serves as the local history museum of Camuy.
Antigua Casa Residencia Exgobernador Don Jesús T. Piñero		Canóvanas	96-80-007-JP-SH	January 16, 1996	Former residence of Jesús T. Piñero, the last United States-appointed and first Puerto Rican-born governor of Puerto.
Antigua Clínica Ramírez Quiles		Mayagüez	2002-25-JP-SH	July 18, 2002	Exemplary monumental residence built during the Golden Age of Mayagüez. Before falling into disrepair it hosted a local clinic.
Antigua Estación del Tren		Aguada	189-2008	August 7, 2008	Former train station of the national railroad system, serving Aguada Pueblo, the historic downtown of the municipality of Aguada in northwestern Puerto Rico. Today it hosts a local history and agriculture museum.
Antigua Vaquería Subestación Experimental Agrícola		Gurabo	2013-47-02-JP-SH	August 27, 2013	Former dairy farm structure designed by famed architect Henry Klumb now located in the University of Puerto Rico Agricultural Experimental Substation in Gurabo.
Antiguas Casas Gemelas Defilló-Mooyer		Mayagüez	2016-29-02-JP-SH	January 16, 2018	Set of Neoclassical "twin houses". One of the houses is preserved as a museum dedicated to the life of musician and abolitionist Pilar Defilló Amiguet, mother of Enric and Pablo Casals.
Antiguo Centro de Procesamiento de Tabaco		Caguas	2002-46-01-JP-SH	October 30, 2002	Former blacksmith and workshop which became a tobacco processing part during the second half of the 19th-century. Now houses the Herminio Torres Grillo Tobacco Museum.
Antiguo Edificio Suliveres		Arecibo	2016-06-01-JP-SH	November 18, 2016	Architecturally significant associated with the vernacular adaptation of early 20th-century architectural and engineering trends of the time.
Antiguo Instituto Blanche Kellog		San Juan	2003-18-01-JP-SH	April 9, 2003	Former Congregational almshouse of the Blanche Kellog Institute. Now used as medical offices and part of the Ciudadela commercial and residential complex.
Antiguo Leprocomio Insular		Trujillo Alto	2004-19-01-JP-SH	July 2, 2004	Early 20th-century leprosy sanatorium built to replace the dated Isla de Cabras leprosy colony facilities. It closed in the 1970s and today it functions as a retirement community and Russian Orthodox church.
Antiguo Pueblo del Niño		Dorado	2016-11-01-JP-SH	October 28, 2016	Rafael Carmoega-designed orphanage complex consisting of three buildings and a small chapel built as part of a publicly funded project to modernize social services throughout the island.
Arroyo Historic Zone		Arroyo	97-72-007-JP-ZH	June 13, 1997	Historic downtown area (pueblo) of the municipality of Arroyo. Includes properties such as former U.S. Customs House (Casa de Aduana de Arroyo) and the Roman Catholic parish church.
Batey Central Columbia		Maunabo	2007-74-02-JP-SH	April 30, 2007	Ruins of the early 20th-century Columbia sugarcane refinery plant, warehouse and railway complex. Despite only operating for 27 years it was very productive until its closure in the 1930s due to the Great Depression and the impact of Hurricane San Felipe.
Biblioteca Pública de Ensenada		Guánica	99-59-015-JP-SH	January 21, 1999	Vernacular-style public library from 1940 established as the first non-segregated bilingual public services building in the Central Guánica complex. Part of the Ensenada Historic Zone.
Caguas Historic Zone		Caguas	96-46-006-JP-ZH	July 6, 1996	Historic downtown area (pueblo) of the municipality of Caguas. Includes the main town square (Plaza Palmer), the Roman Catholic parish church and other properties listed in the NRHP such as the former city hall.
Casa Alcaldía		Aguada	187-2008	August 7, 2008	Former city hall of the municipality of Aguada dating to 1929. Today the site of the municipal archives and revenue collections offices.
Casa Caritas II/Casa de los Macarones II		Mayagüez	2022-29-01-JP-SH	November 8, 2022	Highly ornated Neoclassical-style residences, today commercial buildings. Their local nicknames Casa Caritas and Casa de los Macarones translate as the "house of the little faces" and "house of the macarons", respectively.
Casa de la Sucesión Mendoza Patiño		Aguada	2006-26-01-JP-SH	January 24, 2006	
Casa Urrutia (Oficina Regional ICPR)		Mayagüez	2006-29-01-JP-SH	January 24, 2006	Historic residence, at some point the local headquarters of Spanish army officials and known as Casa de los Oficiales Españoles, today it hosts the regional headquarters of the Institute of Puerto Rican Culture.
Cementerio Municipal		San Sebastián	2021-30-02-JP-SH	October 24, 2022	The 19th-century principal municipal cemetery of the town of San Sebastián is one of the oldest municipal burial grounds in the island. Established during a deadly 1855 cholera epidemic that greatly affected the region, it is exemplary of the designs of public cemeteries of the time.
Central Azucarera Pellejas		Adjuntas	62-2011	April 14, 2011	Ruins of a 20th century sugarcane plantation, one of the very few examples of its type in the central mountainous region of Puerto Rico. It closed down in 1949.
Coamo Historic Zone		Coamo	95-66-005-JP-ZH	July 19, 1995	Historic downtown area (pueblo) of the municipality of Coamo and one of the oldest European-established settlements in Puerto Rico. Includes properties such as the city hall and NRHP-listed properties such as the Church of San Blas de Illescas and the Picó Pomar Residence.
Comunidad Central Cortada Historic Zone		Santa Isabel	198-2015	December 4, 2015	Historic sugarcane plantation and refinery, and former company town dating to 1918, established at the site of a previous slave-labor plantation. The refinery operated until 1974, making it one of the last to cease operations in the island.
Edificio de Apartamentos		Aguadilla	2016-01-01-JP-SH	May 10, 2017	
Edificio Eduardo Tartak		San Juan	2004-18-01-JP-SH	February 4, 2004	Spanish Colonial and Mission Revival-style apartment building built at a time of rapid expansion in Santurce. Also known as the Maneco Becerril Building.
Edificio Jean-Lo (Antiguo Club Casino Mayagüezano)		Mayagüez	2006-29-01-JP-SH	January 24, 2006	Ornate Neoclassical-style building now known as the Jean-Lo Building but formerly known as the Club Casino Mayagüezano, a Spanish social club and event center. The building was destroyed by the 1918 earthquake and rebuilt in 1933.
Edificio La Palma (Antiguo Hotel La Palma)		Mayagüez	2006-29-01-JP-SH	January 24, 2006	Former hotel and apartment building characteristic of the multi-story projects developed in Mayagüez and larger Puerto Rican towns during the mid 20th-century.
Edificio “Marine World” (Antiguo Edificio González Padín)		Mayagüez	2006-29-01-JP-SH	January 24, 2006	Historic mixed-use late 19th-century building which throughout its existence has hosted hotels, commerce, offices and department stores such as González Padín.
Edificio Ochoa		San Juan	2004-18-03-JP-SH	November 4, 2004	Early 20th-century mixed use high-rise building with Revivalist and Chicago School-inspired architectural styles designed by Pedro Adolfo de Castro y Besosa. This was one of the first "skyscrapers" to be developed and built in Puerto Rico.
Edificio Olimpo 611		San Juan	99-18-016-JP-SH	January 21, 1999	Architecturally significant Spanish Colonial Revival-style apartment building. Part of the Miramar Historic Zone.
Ensenada Historic Zone		Guánica	JPH-122	August 3, 2014	Historic area consisting of former Central Guánica, at one point the second largest in the world, including its sugarcane refinery, chimneys, related infrastructure, in addition to the historic center of the barrio and the Monte Las Pardas peninsula.
Escuela de la Comunidad Santiago Negroni		Yauco	2012-60-01-JP-SH	November 18, 2016	Architecturally significant Neoclassical and Spanish Colonial Revival-style school.
Escuela Lucchetti		San Juan	2021-18-91—JP-SH	September 8, 2021	Antonín Nechodoma-designed school notable for its V-shape, built in 1908, and commissioned by Louise Méndez de Luchetti for the emerging community of Condado.
Escuela Narciso Rabell Cabrero		San Sebastián	2002-24-JP-SH	July 18, 2002	Built 1924 and designed by Rafael Carmoega, it is characteristic of the early 20th-century public school buildings established throughout the island.
Funeraria Fernández		Mayagüez	2004-29-01-JP-DE	December 2, 2004	Historic early 20th-century funeral home, typical of the funerary buildings which would be developed throughout the rest of the century in Puerto Rico.
Guayama Historic Zone		Guayama	JPH-4	July 10, 1992	Historic downtown area (pueblo) of the municipality of Guayama. Includes the main town square and NRHP-inscribed properties such as the Roman Catholic parish church and Casa Cautiño.
Hacienda Burenes		Ponce	2014-63-01-JP-SH	April 15, 2006	Ruins of a late 19th-century coffee plantation and manor house distinctive for demonstrating the transition period between old and modern plantation house architecture in the island. The site was greatly damaged by Hurricane Georges.
Hacienda Río Prieto		Maricao	2026-32-01-JP-SH	July 29, 2026	Exemplary early 20th-century coffee plantation established by Corsican immigrants.
Hotel Mayagüez Plaza (Antigua Casa Parroquial de los Rendentoristas)		Mayagüez	2006-29-01-JP-SH	January 24, 2006	Former downtown parish house, first built for the Congregation of the Most Holy Redeemer, typical of the rectories built by the Roman Catholic Church in large Puerto Rican towns during the 20th-century. The parish house today functions as a hotel.
Iglesia San Vicente de Paul		San Juan	2003-18-02-JP-SH	October 21, 2003	Originally established in 1938 by Bishop Edwin Vincent Byrne as a local parish for the marginalized community of El Fanguito. It built for the Congregation of the Mission and was designed by Jaime and Francisco Fullana Serra who incorporated Modernist, Revivalist Romanesque, Renaissance, Mission and Mexican Baroque styles. Its interior was elaborately decorated by Catalan artist Ismael D’Alzina.
La Casa Rectoría de la Universidad del Turabo		Gurabo	95-47-006-JP-SH	December 22, 1995	Former plantation manor of Hacienda Mano Manca, part of Central Santa Juana, one of the most important sugarcane plantations of the region at the time. Today the rectory building of the Ana G. Mendéz University, Gurabo campus (formerly Turabo University).
La Casita Verde-Residencia Don Abelardo Díaz Alfaro		Caguas	JP-SH-93-02	December 1, 1993	Distinctive creole house typical of the late 19th-century vernacular architecture of Puerto Rico, this was the residence of psychologist and Criollo writer Abelardo Díaz Alfaro. The house today hosts a cultural center and biographical museum with memorabilia.
Las Palmas 640		San Juan	2016-18-01-JP-SH	December 22, 2016	Part of Miramar Historic Zone.
Las Palmas 644		San Juan	2016-18-01-JP-SH	December 22, 2016	Part of Miramar Historic Zone.
Las Palmas esq. Refugio 901		San Juan	2016-18-01-JP-SH	December 22, 2016	Part of Miramar Historic Zone.
Manatí Historic Zone		Manatí	JP-H-2	January 15, 1986	Historic downtown area (pueblo) of the municipality of Manatí. Closely associated with the regional sugarcane and tobacco industries. Includes the historic municipal cemetery and NRHP-inscribed properties such as the Roman Catholic parish church and the former tobacco collective.
Miramar Historic Zone		San Juan	2007-18-JP-ZH	December 23, 2010	Historic district in Santurce famous for its historic Prairie School, Mission and Spanish Revival-style homes with patios and gardens built during the early 20th-century along the former San Juan Tramway.
Museo Casa Grande (Antigua Residencia Campoamor)		Mayagüez	2006-29-01-JP-SH	January 24, 2006	Former 1890 Neoclassical-style residence of Benigno Rodríguez Campoamor, viceconsul of Spain at the time, distinctive for being one of the few properties of its time to survive the 1918 earthquake. The house now functions as a municipal museum.
Ponce Historic Zone		Ponce	JPH-3	February 3, 1989	Historic downtown area (pueblo) of the municipality of Ponce with the Plaza Las Delicias as its centerpiece, famous for being the birthplace of the Neoclassical Isabeline and Ponce Creole styles. The zone also includes the historic core of the Ponce Playa area.
Primera Iglesia de Cristo Científico		San Juan	2007-18-01-JP-SH	August 20, 2007	Oldest congregation of the Church of Christ, Scientist in Puerto Rico, located in a small historic Mission Revival-style structure.
Refugio 902		San Juan	2016-18-01-JP-SH	December 22, 2016	Part of Miramar Historic Zone.
Refugio 903		San Juan	2016-18-01-JP-SH	December 22, 2016	Part of Miramar Historic Zone.
Residencia Beneján		Aguadilla	2000-(RO)-19-JP-SH	December 21, 2000	Also known as the Silva-Beneján House. Delisted from the NRHP due to procedural errors in nomination.
Residencia Familia Barket (Casa Barket)		Mayagüez	2016-29-01-JP-SH	May 10, 2017	Notable Spanish Colonial and Mission Revival-style residence built by Lebanese immigrants during the mid 20th-century. Today it functions as a restaurant.
Residencia García Quevedo		Añasco	2016-28-01-JP-SH	April 22, 2016	
Residencia González Lebrón (Antigua Residencia Comas Barber)		Mayagüez	2006-29-01-JP-SH	January 24, 2006	
Residencia Lcda. Nilita Vientós Gastón		San Juan	JP-SH-93-01	December 1, 1993	
Residencia Vigía 23		Ponce	2020-63-01-JP-SH	February 10, 2021	
Restaurante Siglo XX (Antigua Residencia Honore)		Mayagüez	2006-29-01-JP-SH	January 24, 2006	
Ruinas Antigua Hacienda La Lucía		Yabucoa	2016-75-01-JP-SH	December 2, 2016	Ruins of Hacienda La Lucía, also known as Central Santa Lucía, one of the most lucrative sugarcane plantations and refineries in Puerto Rico during the 19th-century.
Ruinas y Chimeneas de las Antiguas Centrales Los Caños y Bayaney		Arecibo, Hatillo	194-2018	August 5, 2018	Multiple property-historic site comprising the ruins of the Los Caños and the Bayaney sugarcane refineries, in Arecibo and Hatillo respectively, including their chimneys, and the former sugarcane transportation route between them, today PR-651 and PR-134 routes, designated as the "Northern Sugar Route" (Ruta del Azúcar Norteño).
Ruinas del Batey y de la Antigua Central San Vicente		Vega Baja	2005-09-01-JP-SH	December 14, 2005	Ruins of Central San Vicente, the first modern sugarcane plantation and refinery in Puerto Rico (1873–1967).
Sagrado Corazón Historic Zone		San Juan	JP-PS-ZHSC	December 22, 2016	Historic district of Santurce famous for its Revivalist, Prairie School and Art Deco architecture.
Tienda-Almacén Siempreviva (Casa Sigma Mayagüez)		Mayagüez	2004-29-02-JP-DE	December 2, 2004	Former historic house for officers of the Spanish Army, latter operated La Siempreviva fabric store. It now serves as the gathering space for the Phi Sigma Alpha fraternity in Mayagüez.
Túneles subterráneos que discurren debajo del casco urbano de Arecibo		Arecibo	296-2018	December 29, 2018	Tunnel system which connects the Arecibo cathedral and city hall to La Puntilla fortress area (today the Paseo Víctor Rojas), built by the Spanish primarily as a storm drain to prevent flooding and secondarily to move prisoners from the fort to the city jail.
Vega Baja Historic Zone		Vega Baja	2004-09-08-JP-ZH	September 30, 2004	Historic downtown area (pueblo) of the municipality of Vega Baja. Includes the historic center around the main town square, two schools and the former train station as stated in the official name: Zona Histórica del Centro Urbano y tres Sitios Históricos (Escuela José Gualberto Padilla, Escuela Brígida y Antigua Estación del Tren).
Villa Caparra-Residencia Pedro Adolfo de Castro y Besosa		Guaynabo	98-16-014-JP-SH	December 17, 1998	
Villa Fernández		San Juan	97-17-011-JP-SH	June 13, 1997	
Yauco Historic Zone		Yauco	2022-24-06-JP-ZH	June 24, 2023	Historic downtown area (pueblo) of the municipality of Yauco, strongly associated with the coffee industry and Corsican immigration to Puerto Rico. Strongly impacted by the 2020 Puerto Rico earthquake, it includes the main town square and 222 buildings and structures, some of which are NRHP-inscribed.

== See also ==
- National Register of Historic Places listings in Puerto Rico
