= Amiguet =

Amiguet is a surname. Notable people with the surname include:

- Caroline Amiguet (born 1977), French actress
- Jean-François Amiguet (born 1950), Swiss film director and screenwriter
- Pilar Defilló Amiguet (1853–1931), Puerto Rican and Catalan musician
