= Lluís Claret =

- Birth name: Lluís Claret i Serra
- Born: 10 March 1951 (age 74); Andorra la Vella, Andorra
- Genres: Classical
- Occupation: Cellist
- Instrument: Cello

Lluís Claret (born Lluís Claret i Serra, 10 March 1951) is an Andorran cellist. Claret has taught and played internationally as well as in Barcelona. He is a member of the jury for some major international competitions. His twin brother is violinist Gerard Claret.

== Life ==
Claret was born in Andorra la Vella in 1951, to parents who were exiled from Catalonia during the Spanish Civil War. His father became friends with Pablo Casals, who is Claret's godfather. His twin brother is violinist Gerard Claret. Claret he began his musical education at the age of 9. In 1964 he moved to Barcelona, won major distinctions at the Conservatory of the Liceu, and began working with Enric Casals. Claret continued his studies in France, Italy and in the USA, working with Maurice Gendron and Radu Aldulescu. Throughout his career he has been especially committed to chamber music. Claret has taught at the “Victoria dels Angels” Music School at Sant Cugat, and the Conservatori Superior de Música del Liceu in Barcelona, and the Toulouse Conservatory in France. He joined the New England Conservatory for the 2016/17 season.

He has performed with many noted orchestras including National Symphony de Washington, Moscow Philharmonic, National Orchestra of France, English Chamber Orchestra, Hungarian Philharmonic, Czech Philharmonic.

He won first prizes at a number of prestigious international competitions, including the first prize in the 1977 Rostropovich Cello Competition, and first prize in the Pablo Casals International Cello Competition of 1976. He is a founding member of the Trio de Barcelona and frequently collaborates with well-known musicians. He teaches at music schools and conservatories and he also regularly participates in the juries of major international competitions, including the Rostropovitch Competition, the Paulo Cello Competition in Helsinki, Finland, and the Adam Cello Competition in Auckland, New Zealand.
