= Central Romana Port =

- Interactive map of Central Romana Port
- Native name: Puerto La Romana

Location
- Country: Dominican Republic
- Location: La Romana
- Coordinates: 18°25′0″N 68°57′35″W

Details
- Owned by: Central Romana Corporation
- Type of harbour: Cargo and cruise
- No. of berths: 2

Statistics
- Website cruiselaromana.com

Central Romana Port (Puerto La Romana), also known as La Romana Port, is a privately owned cargo and cruise port situated along the La Romana River in La Romana in Dominican Republic. It is owned and operated by Central Romana Corporation, and is supervised by the Dominican Port Authority. The port has two berths, one dedicated to sugar export and the other cruise terminal serving for other operations.

== History ==
The Central Romana Port is owned by the Central Romana Corporation, which was formed when the South Porto Rico Sugar Company purchased land in the La Romana in 1912. The port was primarily used for sugar exports, and when the company diversified later to other industries including tourism, a cruise terminal was added in 2002. The International Port Security Certificate was granted by the Dominican Port Authority in 2006. The terminal was further expanded at a cost of US$ 15 million in 2022. In November 2022, the United States Customs and Border Protection issued a ban on sugar shipments from the port, which was lifted in March 2025.

== Facilities and operations ==
The port is situated along the La Romana River. It has two berths, the west berth is used for exports of sugar and sugar products by the Central Romana Corporation, while the east berth caters to other services including cruise ships. The entrance channel has a depth of 11.5 m (38 ft), and is capable of accommodating vessels with a maximum draft of 10.5 m (34 ft). The cruise pier is 256 m (840 ft) long and can accommodate ships up to 360 m (1,180 ft) in length and gross tonnage of 226,000 tons.

== See also ==
- List of ports and harbours of the Atlantic Ocean
