= La Romana, Dominican Republic =

La Romana
- City
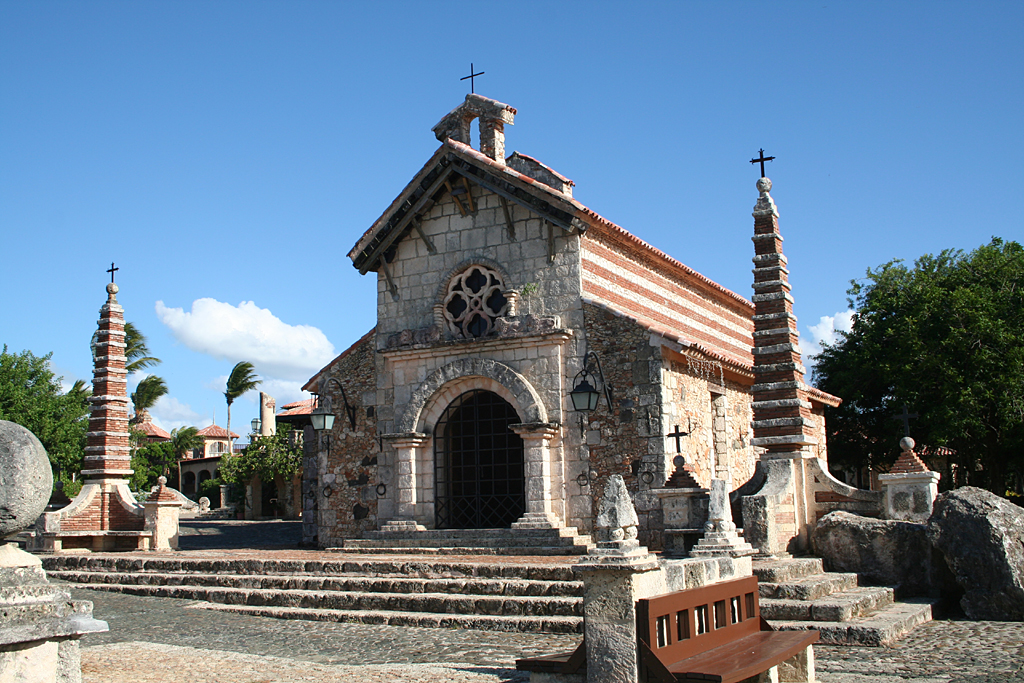
- Altos de Chavon church in La Romana, Dominican Republic

- Location within the Dominican Republic
- Coordinates: 18°25′48″N 68°58′12″W
- Country: Dominican Republic
- Province: La Romana Province
- Municipality since: 1897

Area
  - Total: 185.52 km^{2} (71.63 sq mi)
- Elevation: 10 m (33 ft)

Population (2022 census)
  - Total: 153,241
  - Density: 826.01/km^{2} (2,139.4/sq mi)
  - Urban: 149,840
  - Metro: 270,000 (La Romana-Villa Hermosa conurbation)
  - Demonym: (spanish: Romanense)
- Distance to – Santo Domingo: 120 km
- Municipal Districts: 1
- Climate: Aw

La Romana is a municipality and capital of the southeastern La Romana Province, opposite Catalina Island. It is one of the 10 largest cities in the Dominican Republic with a population estimated in 2022 at 153,241 within the city limits (metropolitan population: 270,000), of whom 149,840 are urban and 3,401 are rural. The name Romana comes from the word "Bomana", a name given by Indians to what is known today as Romana River.

The modern La Romana International Airport was opened in 2000. The city is near several other cities, such as San Pedro de Macorís and the national capital, Santo Domingo de Guzmán. The city is a hub for a growing tourist industry with several nearby local resort spots, such as the beachfront Bayahibe, Dominicus, Casa de Campo, and the growing number of golf resorts that surround the area.

== History ==
The city of La Romana was officially founded in 1897 as an oil town. After 1917 with the construction of a large sugar-mill the economy quickly shifted to sugar production. The commissioning of the sugar mill coincided with the rise in sugar prices worldwide, prompting the sugar industry to welcome workers from different parts of the country as well as other parts of the Caribbean, many families moved to La Romana for economic opportunities.

In early 1960, Gulf and Western Industries, Inc. purchased the sugar mill and started to invest in the livestock industry which was cemented in the province. Meanwhile, $20 million were invested to rebuild La Romana and build schools, clinics, housing and other infrastructure for workers. During the mid-1970s the American conglomerate began selling its Dominican assets, and at the same time built what is now one of the largest exclusive tourist resorts in the Dominican Republic, Casa de Campo.

== Economy ==
La Romana has historically been a company town, with the Central Romana Corporation owning the majority of the town. It is a town with nearly 100% employment, mostly in the tourism industry or with The Central Romana Corporation, the Duty Free Zone (Zona Franca Romana), or one of the service businesses there.

La Romana has been a one-company town since the South Puerto Rico Sugar Company built the mammoth Central Romana mill in 1917. It was the only sugar operation not taken over by Rafael Trujillo during his reign. From 1964 to 1967, the South Puerto Rico Sugar Company, including properties in Florida, Puerto Rico and the Dominican Republic became part of the conglomerate Gulf+Western. In 1984, the Gulf+Western Corporation sold their stake in the Central Romana Corporation to a group of local and foreign investors which included the Fanjul brothers.

Gulf+Western acquired Consolidated Cigar in 1968 and shifted the Canary Island cigar-making operation to its Tabacalera de Garcia tobacco plant in La Romana. The Tabacalera de Garcia factory is currently one of the largest cigar factories in the world, and has been owned by the biggest cigar marketing company in the world, Altadis, since 1999. Three world-famous brands are produced in La Romana: Montecristo, H. Upmann, and Romeo y Julieta.

=== City of La Romana ===
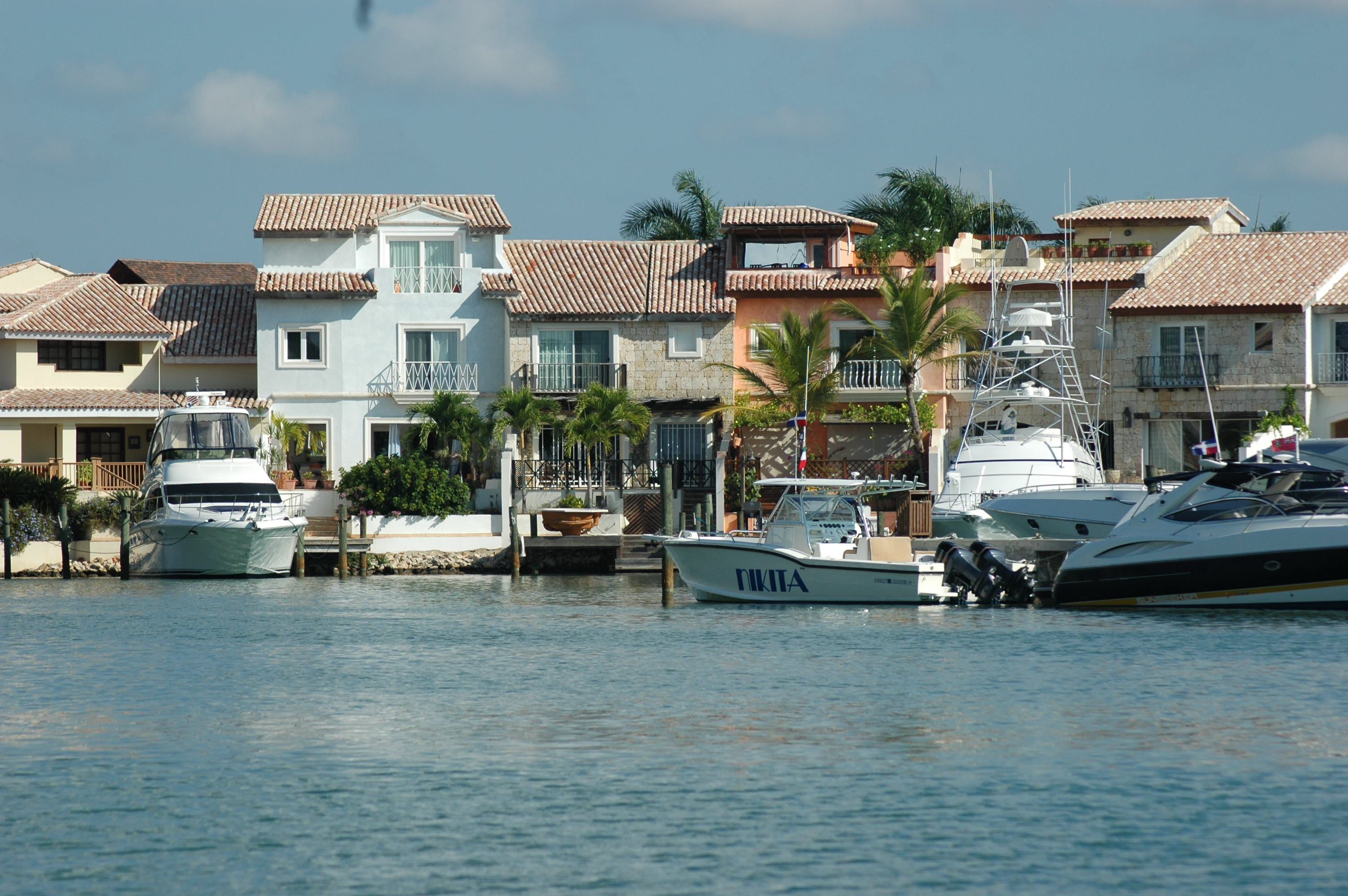

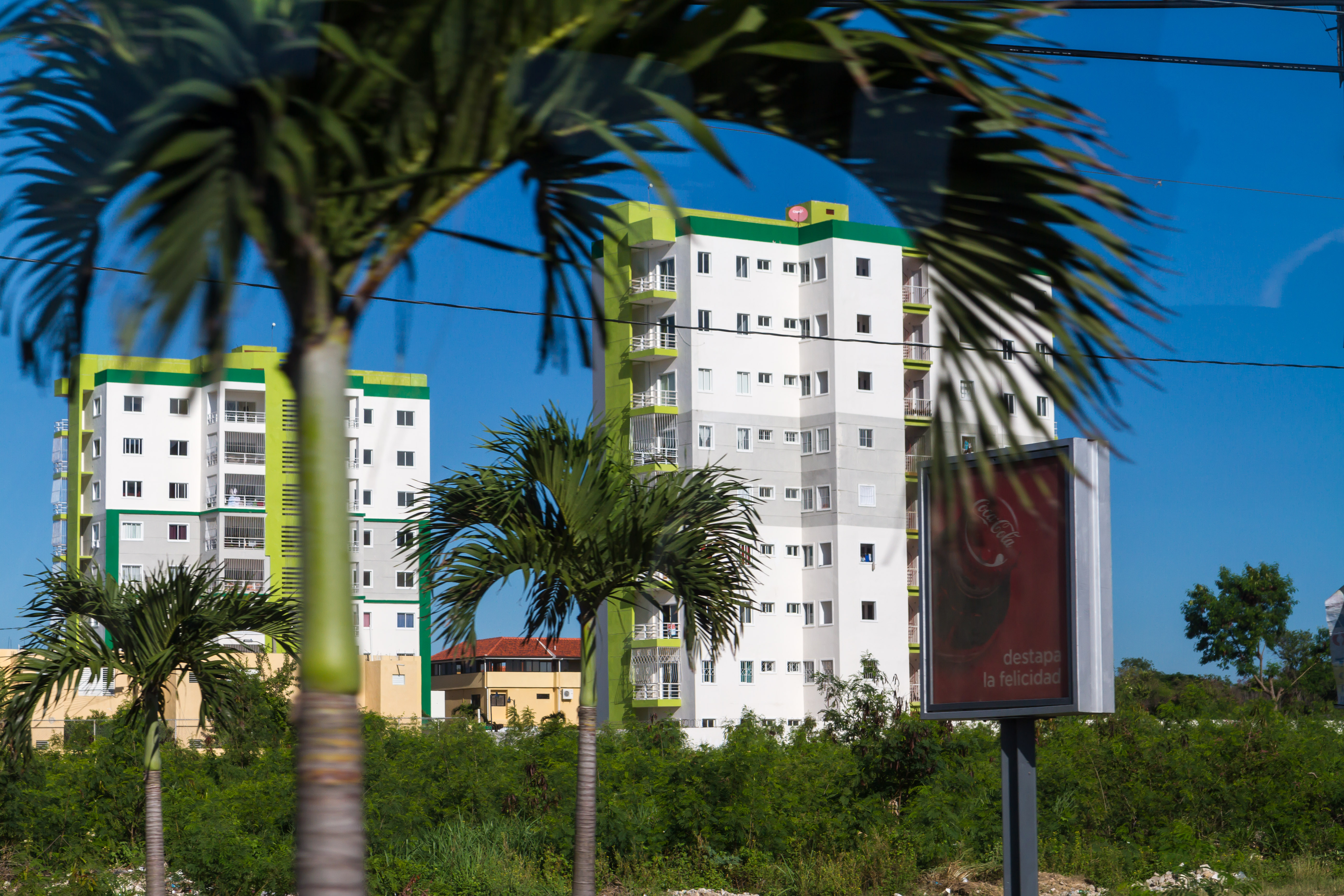

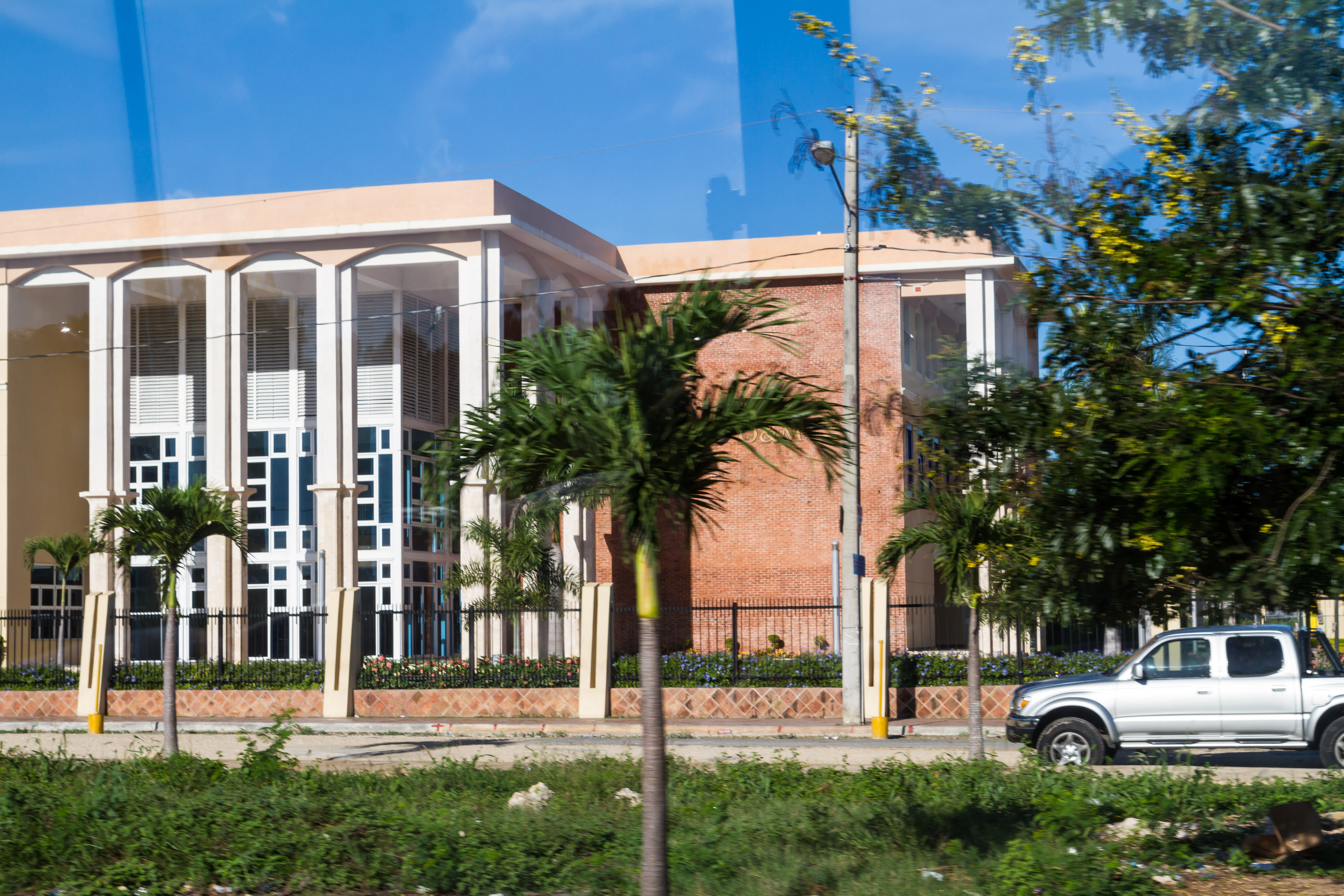

== Tourism ==
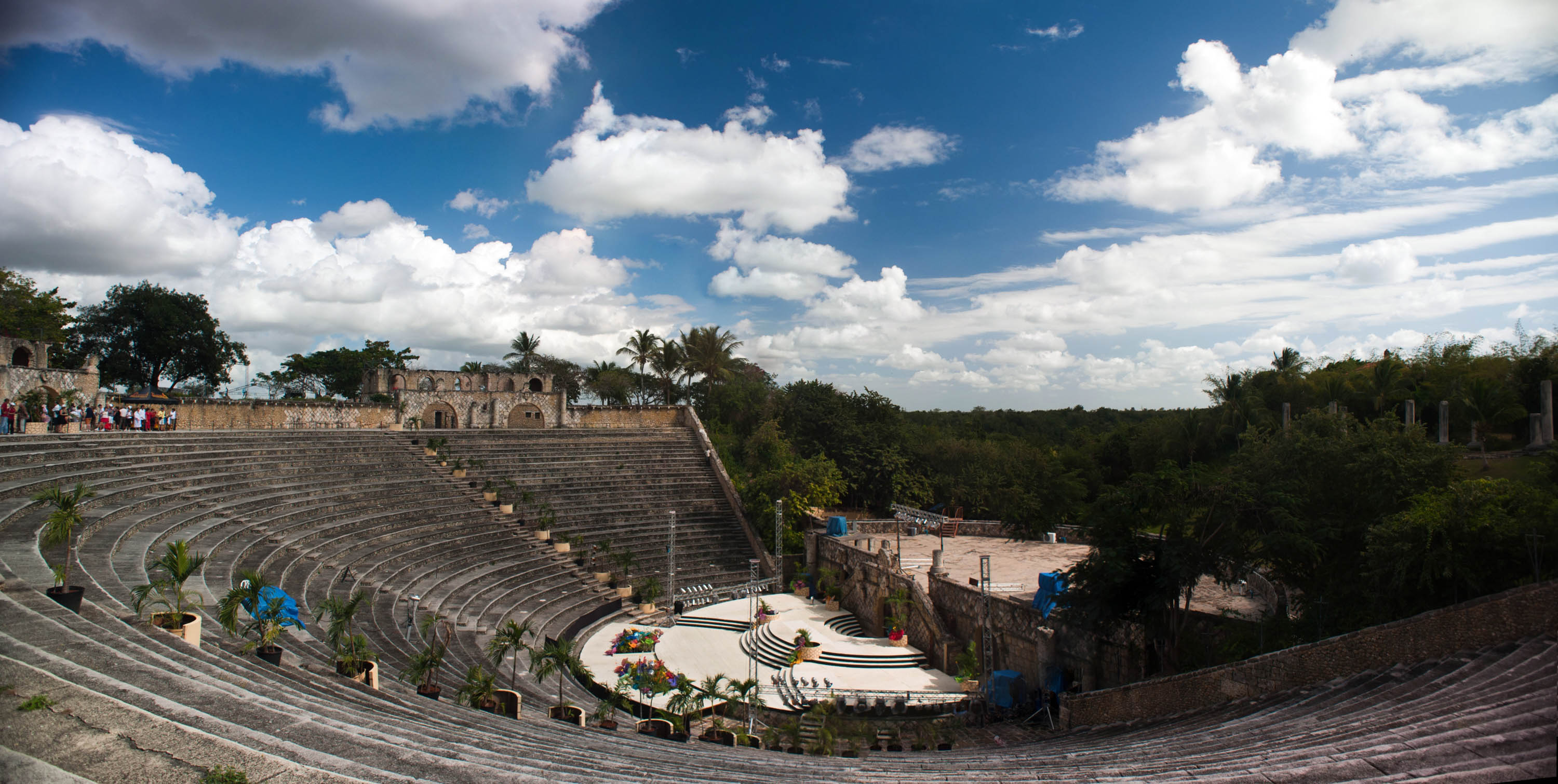
Altos de Chavón Amphitheater.

Among the principal landmarks in central La Romana are Santa Rosa de Lima Church, Central Park, Rotonda Park and the Monument to the Bible. These sites form the core of the city’s urban sightseeing area, distinct from the resort and coastal attractions outside the centre.

Casa de Campo resort complex was built in 1975 by Gulf+Western. In 1984 Casa de Campo was purchased by the Central Romana Corporation, which is co-owned by the Fanjul brothers.

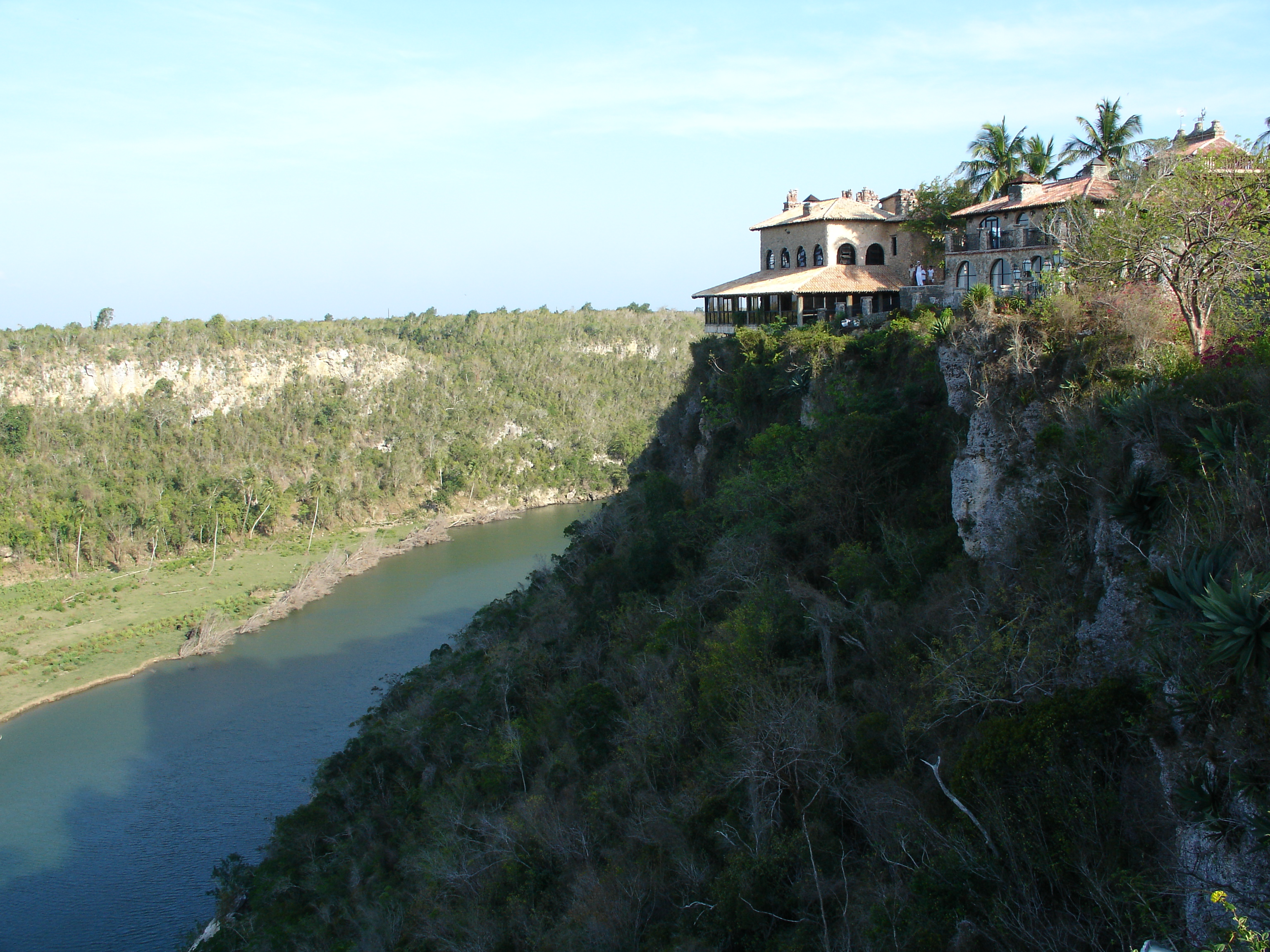
Chavon river in La Romana, Dominican Republic.

Altos de Chavón is a reconstruction of a 16th-century Mediterranean village located just minutes from La Romana.

Casa de Campo International Tourist Port (Muelle Turístico Internacional Casa de Campo), located on the West Bank of La Romana River or Rio Dulce, has been utilized primarily for the docking of commercial ships, primarily for the transport of sugar and molasses. Upon exceeding the capacity of its port, the Central Romana Corporation built its new tourism focused port on the east side of the river. The platform on the western bank was renovated and the river channel was dredged to a depth of 10.50 metres (34.4 ft).

Inaugurated with the arrival of the vessel Costa Marina in December 2002, the Central Romana Corporation invested US$12 million to extend the existing port by over 40,000 square metres (430,000 sq ft). The port is a modern platform and harbor terminal, with a capacity for two large modern cruise ships. Today the new facilities boast two docking platforms (East Dock: 255 metres (837 ft) in length, West Dock: 225 metres (738 ft) in length), a 1,000 square metres (11,000 sq ft) passenger terminal and parking facilities which accommodate 24 buses.

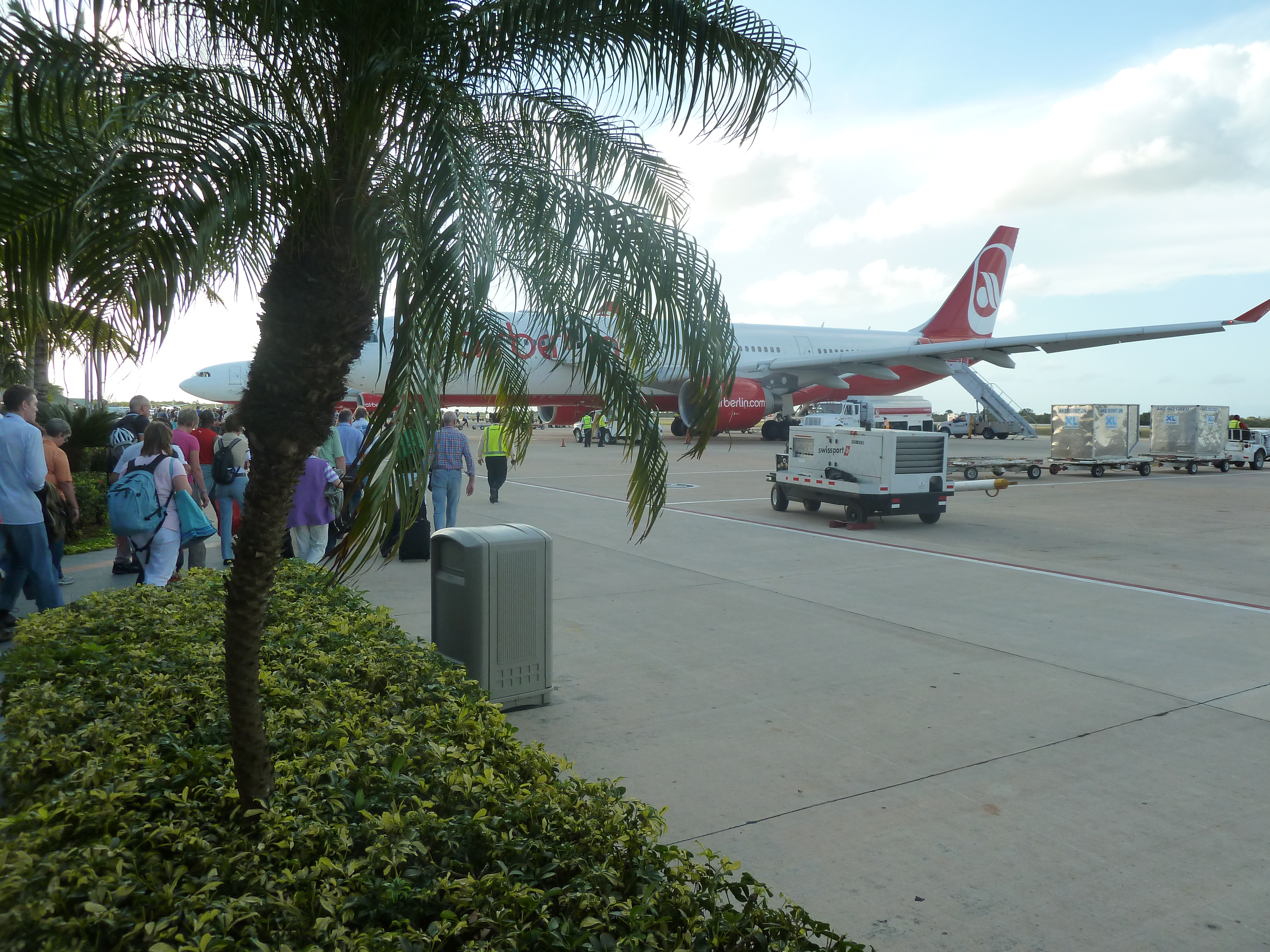
La Romana airport.

La Romana International Airport (IATA: LRM, ICAO: MDLR) is a private commercial airport in the east of the Dominican Republic, serving the town of La Romana and the resort of Casa de Campo. It was built with open-air terminals. It currently ranks fifth in air traffic, behind Punta Cana, Las Américas, Puerto Plata and Santiago. The airport has 7 positions in the international terminal and a spacious private aviation terminal where up to 12 private jets can be parked.

=== Safety ===
The United States State Department in 2024 issued a Level 2 Advisory as a travel advisory to visitors to the Dominican Republic, for tourists to "exercise increased caution." This was a renewal of the DOS statement issued in 2023, noting that DR "is generally safe to those sticking to popular resort areas like Punta Cana and La Romana but remains a risk due to instances of 'violent crime, including armed robbery, homicide and sexual assault' in the country overall." The biggest risk in La Romana was theft, as of 2022, through 2024, more generally of property crime. "Avoid visiting dark, secluded places alone, and avoid beaches at night. Be sure to choose taxis carefully," advised the Miami Herald in 2023 to tourists who are traveling to La Romana and other popular cruise destinations.

== Climate ==
La Romana has a tropical savanna climate (Köppen Aw) only slightly above a hot semi-arid climate (BSh) due to its shielded location from the northeasterly trade winds.

Climate data for La Romana, Dominican Republic (1961–1990)
Month	Jan	Feb	Mar	Apr	May	Jun	Jul	Aug	Sep	Oct	Nov	Dec	Year
Record high °C (°F)	34.8 (94.6)	33.0 (91.4)	34.0 (93.2)	35.0 (95.0)	35.0 (95.0)	36.6 (97.9)	36.8 (98.2)	37.0 (98.6)	37.6 (99.7)	37.7 (99.9)	34.2 (93.6)	33.8 (92.8)	37.7 (99.9)
Mean daily maximum °C (°F)	29.7 (85.5)	30.0 (86.0)	30.5 (86.9)	30.9 (87.6)	31.2 (88.2)	32.0 (89.6)	32.7 (90.9)	32.6 (90.7)	32.2 (90.0)	31.8 (89.2)	30.8 (87.4)	29.9 (85.8)	31.2 (88.2)
Mean daily minimum °C (°F)	19.5 (67.1)	19.5 (67.1)	19.8 (67.6)	20.5 (68.9)	22.0 (71.6)	22.9 (73.2)	23.2 (73.8)	23.2 (73.8)	22.9 (73.2)	22.6 (72.7)	21.6 (70.9)	20.2 (68.4)	21.5 (70.7)
Record low °C (°F)	14.0 (57.2)	15.0 (59.0)	15.5 (59.9)	15.0 (59.0)	16.9 (62.4)	20.0 (68.0)	20.8 (69.4)	20.8 (69.4)	19.5 (67.1)	19.7 (67.5)	17.4 (63.3)	15.0 (59.0)	14.0 (57.2)
Average rainfall mm (inches)	32.7 (1.29)	27.8 (1.09)	27.5 (1.08)	45.2 (1.78)	91.0 (3.58)	57.0 (2.24)	60.9 (2.40)	105.2 (4.14)	116.8 (4.60)	164.6 (6.48)	96.2 (3.79)	47.6 (1.87)	872.5 (34.35)
Average rainy days (≥ 1.0 mm)	4.6	4.3	4.2	5.1	7.4	6.0	6.5	8.1	8.6	9.7	8.3	5.7	78.5
Source: NOAA

== Sports ==
Estadio Francisco Micheli is home to the Toros del Este, a baseball team in the Dominican Winter League.

In 1983, the government of Salvador Jorge Blanco, through the fund for development of this region, built the Polideportivo de La Romana (La Romana Sports Center), which was named after Eleoncio Mercedes in honor of the flyweight boxer who became world champion. The Cañeros de La Romana, a Dominican basketball team, play their home games here.

== Population ==
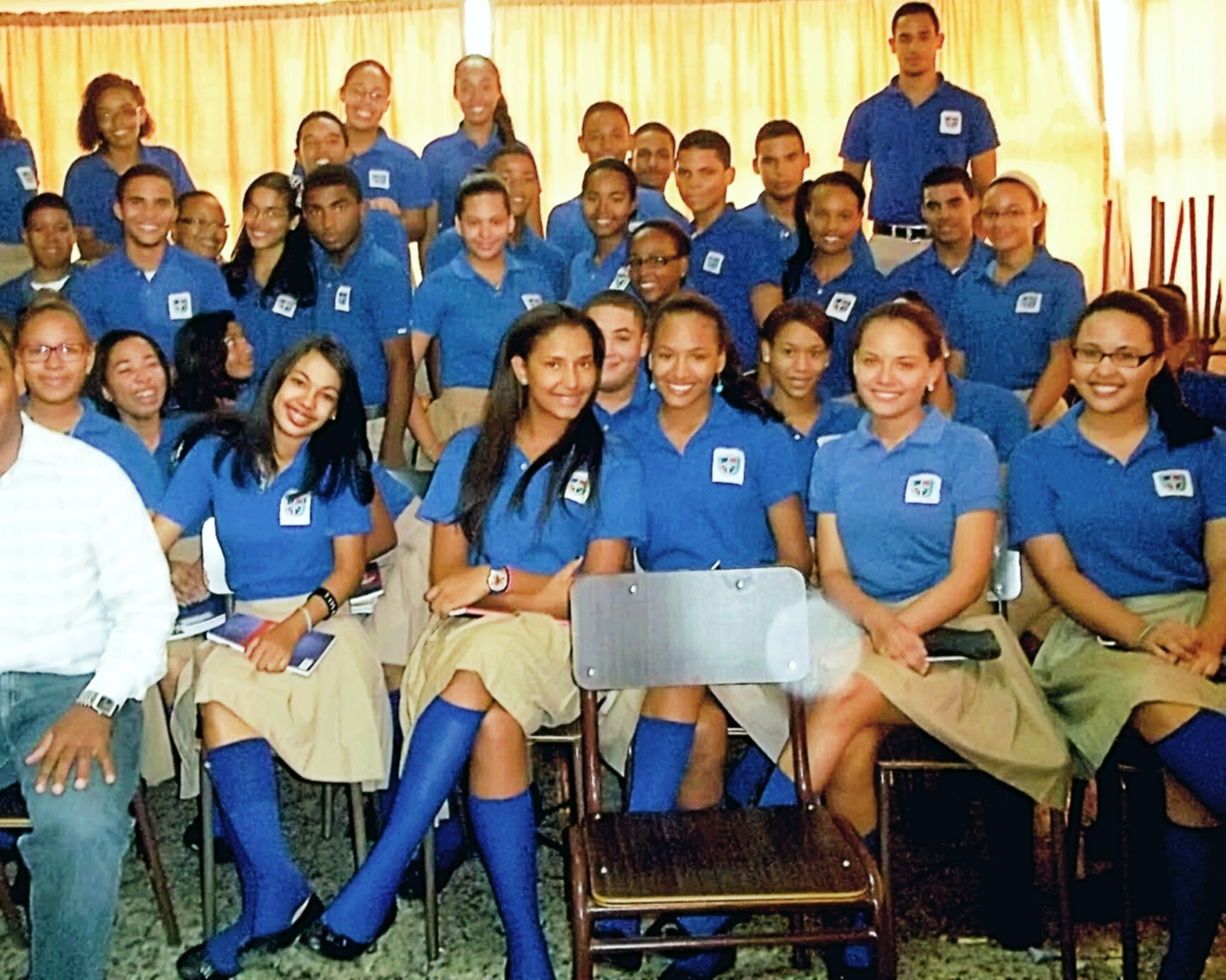
La Romana, Dominican Republic school students.

- 2022 : 131,828
- 2010 : 139,671
- 2022 : 153,241

== Notable people ==
- Fernando Abad, Major League Baseball pitcher for the Boston Red Sox
- Antonio Alfonseca, pitched for the Philadelphia Phillies
- Juana Arrendel, high jumper
- Edison Azcona, footballer
- Miguel Castro, baseball pitcher for the Baltimore Orioles
- Andújar Cedeño, former MLB shortstop
- Domingo Cedeño, former MLB infielder
- Rafael Dolis, relief pitcher for the Toronto Blue Jays.
- Edwin Encarnación, first baseman for the Cleveland Indians.
- Pedro Florimón, shortstop for the Pittsburgh Pirates
- Freddy García, former MLB infielder
- Tito Horford, retired professional basketball player
- Luis Ernesto José, lightweight boxer
- Eleoncio Mercedes, former world champion boxer in the Flyweight division
- Yermín Mercedes, catcher/designated hitter for the San Francisco Giants
- Ramon Rijo A.K.A. "MONCHY," singer, musician, songwriter, and musical producer for Monchy y Alexandra
- John Nolasco, featherweight boxer
- Arismendy Peguero, sprinter who specializes in the 400 metres
- Félix Pie, center fielder for the Hanwha Eagles
- Danny Richar, second baseman for the Chicago White Sox
- Cristopher Sánchez, starting pitcher for the Philadelphia Phillies
- Luis Santana, retired professional boxer
- Rafael Santana, former MLB shortstop
- Enrique Segoviano, former film maker, television producer and director known for working in the Mexican sitcom El Chavo del Ocho
- Julian Yan, retired professional baseball player
