= Pilar Defilló House =

Museum in Puerto Rico

- Museo Casa Pilar Defilló. (Spanish)
- Interactive map of Pilar Defilló House
- 18°12′7″N 67°8′30″W
- Location: Mayagüez, Puerto Rico

History
- Built: 1853
- Built for: Pilar Defilló Amiguet

Site notes
- Governing body: Mayaguez

Puerto Rico Register of Historic Sites and Zones
- Designated: May 18, 2015
- Reference no.: 2016-29-02-JP-SH

The Pilar Defilló House is a museum dedicated to the life of Catalan musician and abolitionist Pilar Defilló Amiguet, mother of Enric and Pablo Casals. It was built about 120 years ago.

== Architecture ==
The museum is housed in a set of Neoclassical "twin houses". It has a frieze which shows a geometric motif and immediately stands out the cornice. The roof is covered with wood and zinc.

== Hurricane and reopening ==
The museum sustained heavy damage in Hurricane Maria. It was repaired and reopened after three years.

== Significance ==
The museum is a historic site.

== Facilities ==
The museum shows an exhibition room with memorabilia by Pablo Casals, portraits of the Defillo family, and a cultural hall for chamber concerts and cultural events.
