= Descalabrado =

Barrio of Santa Isabel, Puerto Rico

- Barrio
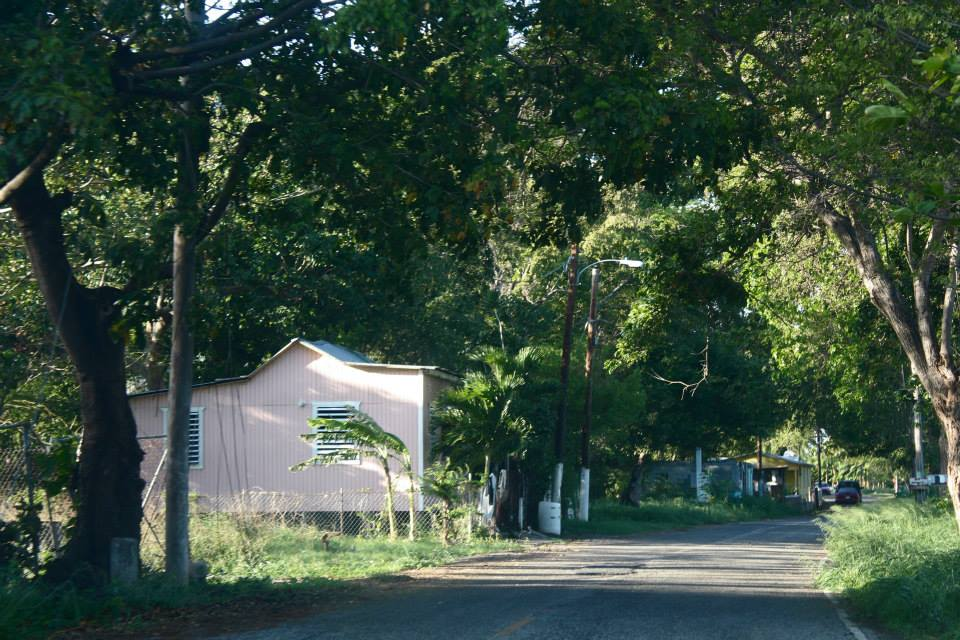
- House near where Central Cortada was

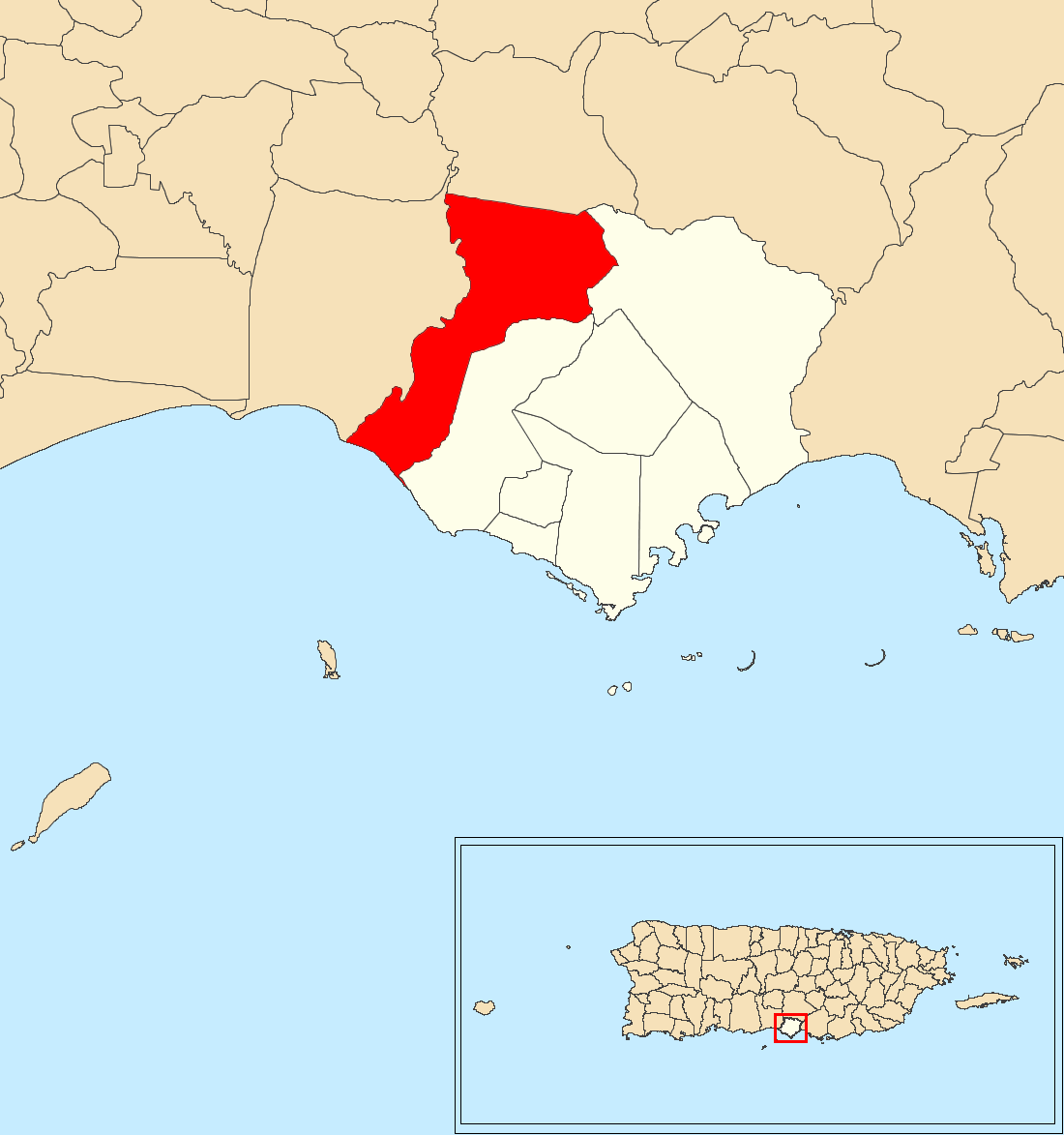
- Location of Descalabrado within the municipality of Santa Isabel shown in red

- Location of Puerto Rico
- Coordinates: 17°59′52″N 66°25′24″W
- Commonwealth: Puerto Rico
- Municipality: Santa Isabel

Area
  - Total: 10.11 sq mi (26.2 km^{2})
  - Land: 7.19 sq mi (18.6 km^{2})
  - Water: 2.92 sq mi (7.6 km^{2})
- Elevation: 43 ft (13 m)

Population (2010)
  - Total: 4,138
  - Density: 575.5/sq mi (222.2/km^{2})
- Source: 2010 Census
- Time zone: UTC−4 (AST)

Descalabrado is a barrio in the municipality of Santa Isabel, Puerto Rico. Its population in 2010 was 4,138.

== History ==
Central Cortada, also known as the Cortada Sugarcane Refinery, was a sugarcane plantation and refinery located in Descalabrado. The area where the refinery is located had been used for the growth and processing of sugarcane since the 18th century.

Descalabrado was in Spain's gazetteers until Puerto Rico was ceded by Spain in the aftermath of the Spanish–American War under the terms of the Treaty of Paris of 1898 and became an unincorporated territory of the United States. In 1899, the United States Department of War conducted a census of Puerto Rico finding that the combined population of Descalabrado and Boca Velázquez barrios was 1,083.

In 1905, via an act of the US Congress, authorization was received to use water from the Descalabrado River to water the crops at the Central Cortada sugar plantation.

Historical population
| Census | Pop. | Note | %± |
|---|---|---|---|
| 1910 | 1,196 | | — |
| 1920 | 1,230 | | 2.8% |
| 1930 | 1,817 | | 47.7% |
| 1940 | 2,102 | | 15.7% |
| 1950 | 2,726 | | 29.7% |
| 1960 | 3,588 | | 31.6% |
| 1970 | 3,988 | | 11.1% |
| 1980 | 4,318 | | 8.3% |
| 1990 | 3,791 | | −12.2% |
| 2000 | 3,918 | | 3.4% |
| 2010 | 4,138 | | 5.6% |
U.S. Decennial Census; 1900 (N/A) 1910-1930; 1930-1950 1980-2000 2010

== Gallery ==
Scenes around Descalabrado:

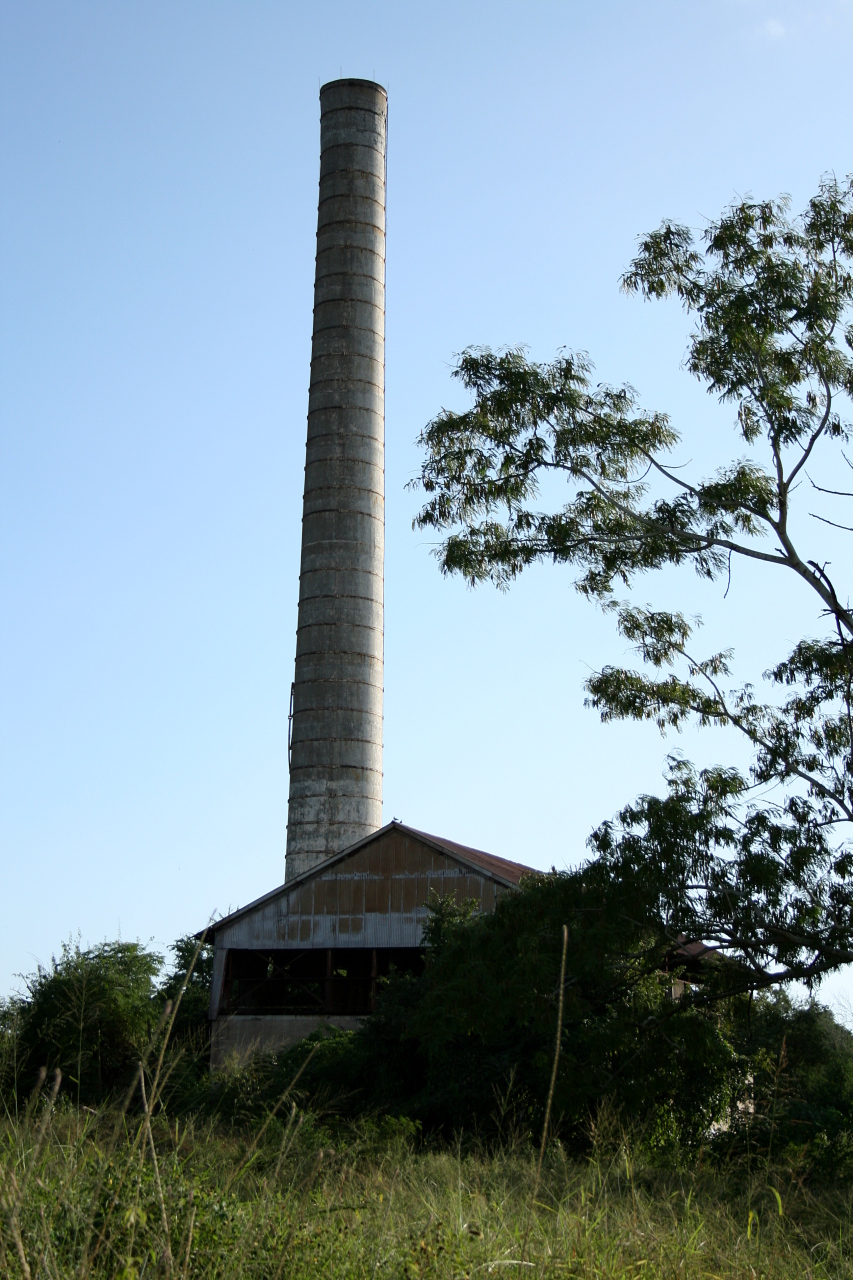
Ruins of the Central Cortada sugarcane mill

== See also ==
- List of communities in Puerto Rico
