= Central Guánica =

Former sugarcane refinery in Guánica, Puerto Rico

Guánica Sugar Mill
- Central Guánica (Spanish)
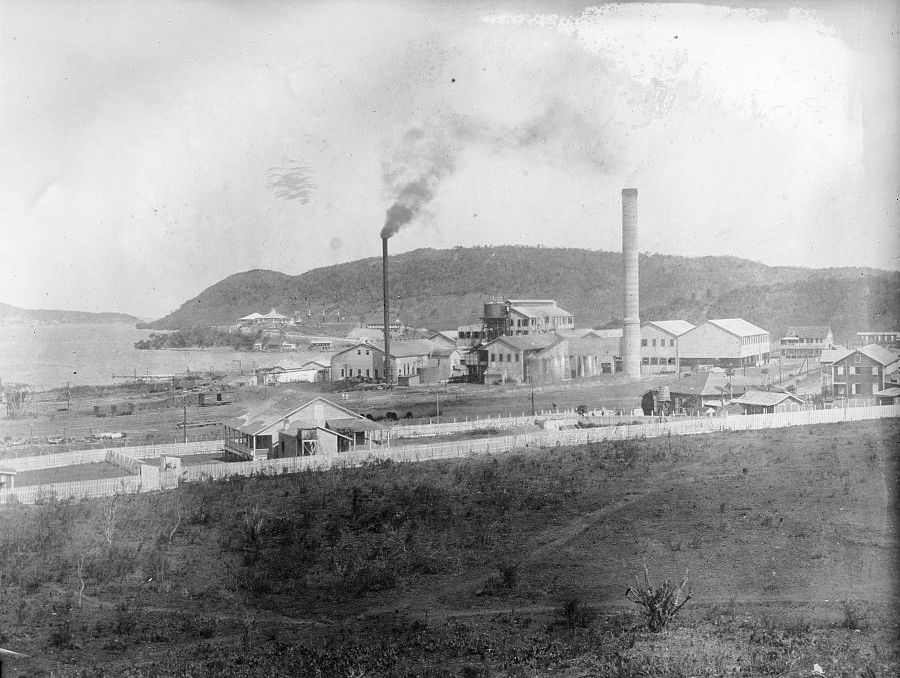
- Central Guánica between 1910 and 1935

- Location in Puerto Rico
- 17.9685°N 66.9296°W
- Location: Guánica, Puerto Rico

History
- Founded: 1901

Site notes
- Owner: South Puerto Rico Sugar Company (1901-1967); Gulf and Western Industries (1967-1970s)

Puerto Rico Register of Historic Sites and Zones
- Designated: August 3, 2014
- Part of: Ensenada Historic Zone
- Reference no.: JPH-122

Central Guánica was a sugar mill located in Ensenada Barrio in the municipality of Guánica, Puerto Rico. It was one of the largest sugar mills in the Caribbean, and until World War I, it was one of the largest mills in the world. It ceased operations in 1982.

== History ==
Its owners, the South Puerto Rico Sugar Company of New Jersey, began construction of the Central Guánica sugar mill in 1901. A company town, which included a hospital, school, and housing facilities was organized around the sugar mill.

In 1967, South Puerto Rico Sugar Company was acquired by Gulf and Western Industries, which later sold the sugar mill during the 1970s.

In 2002, the government of Puerto Rico declared the two chimneys of the sugar mill as historic monuments.

== Gallery ==
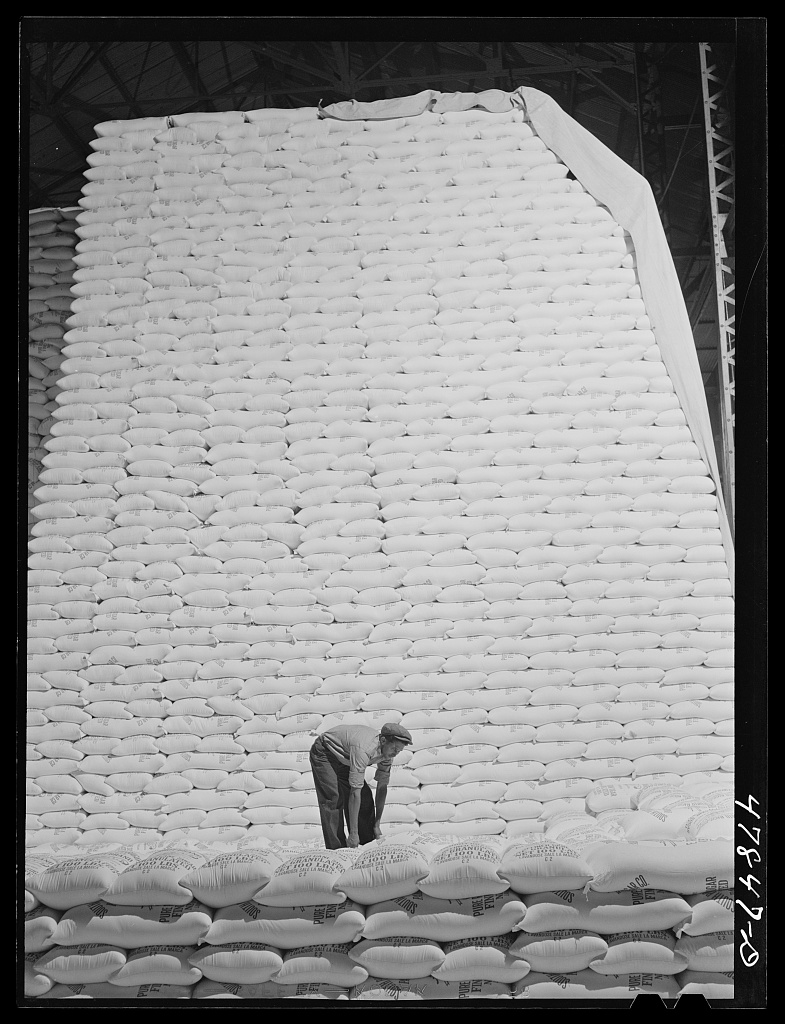
Bags of refined sugar

South Puerto Rico Sugar Company common stock certificate

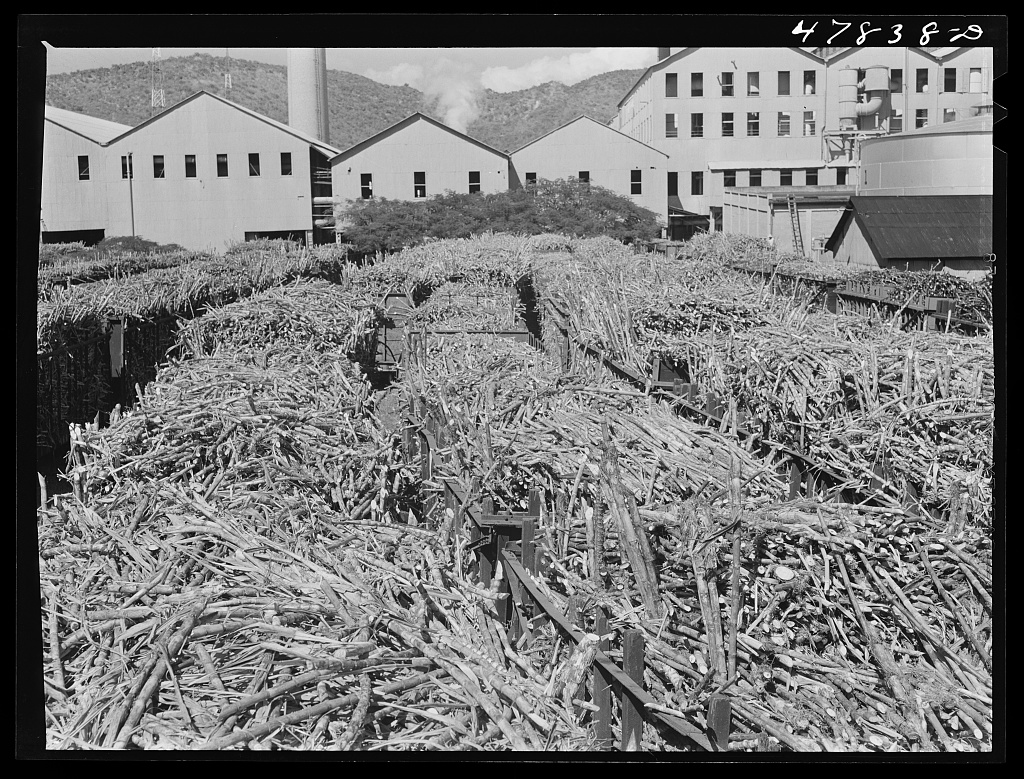
Carloads of sugar cane at the mill (1942)

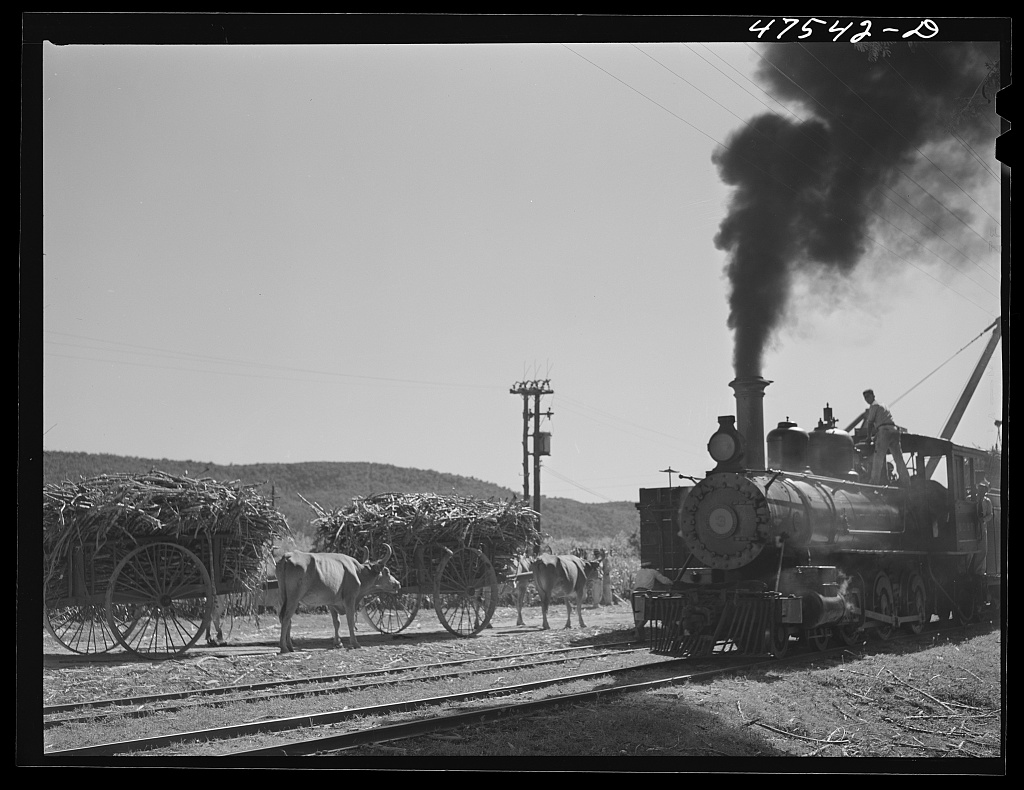
Freight train used in hauling cane to the mill from loading stations (1942)

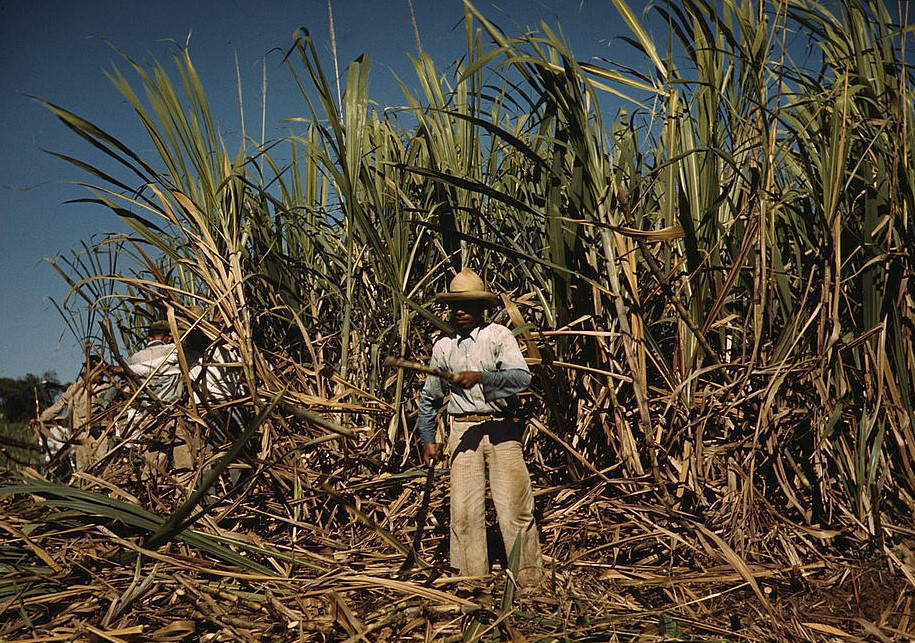
Sugar cane worker in the vicinity of Guánica, Puerto Rico (1942)

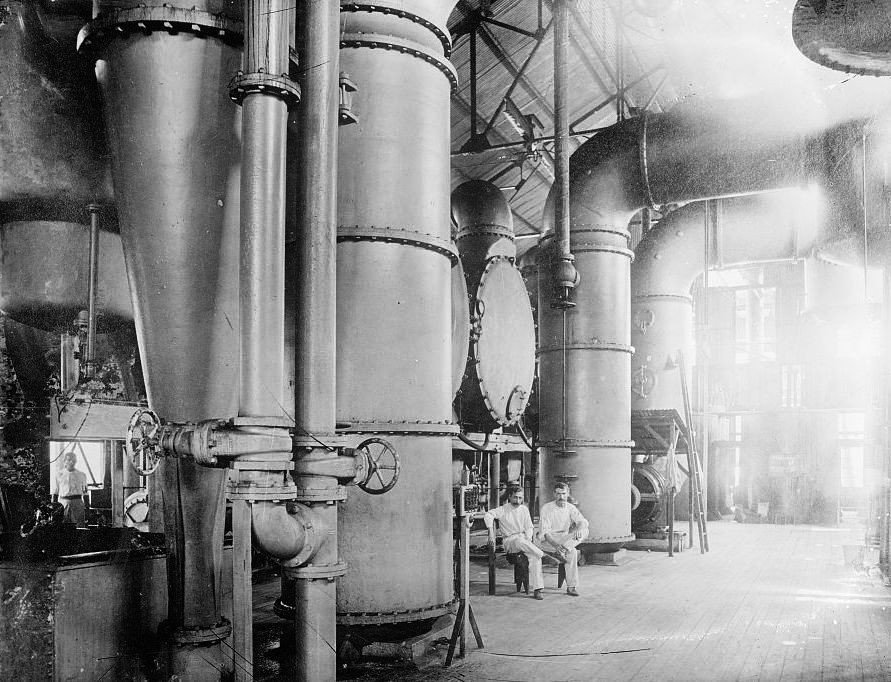
Inside the mill (circa 1910 and 1935)

== See also ==
- Central Coloso
- Central Cortada
- Central San Vicente
