= Central San Vicente =

First sugar factory in Puerto Rico

San Vicente Sugarcane Refinery
- Central San Vicente (Spanish)
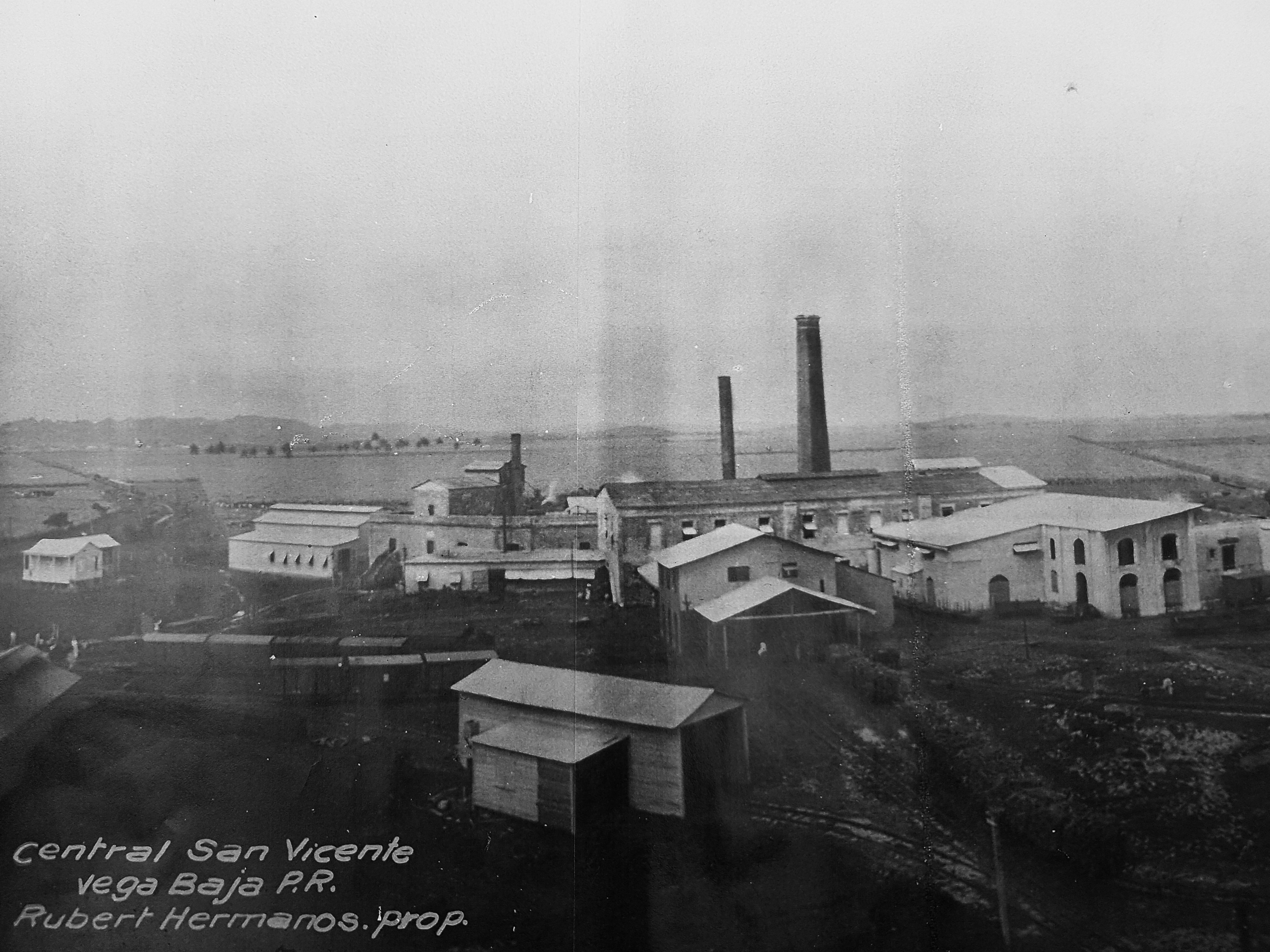
- c.1897

- Location within Puerto Rico
- 18.444388°N 66.387672°W
- Location: Vega Baja, Puerto Rico

History
- Founded: 1873

Site notes
- Owner: L. Igaravidez (1873-1878); José Gallart (1878-1896); Rubert Hermanos (1896); Corp. Azucarera (1972)

Puerto Rico Register of Historic Sites and Zones
- Official name: Ruinas del batey y de la antigua Central San Vicente
- Designated: December 14, 2005
- Reference no.: 2005-09-01-JP-SH

Central San Vicente was the first sugarcane refinery in Puerto Rico, established in 1873 by Leonardo Igaravidez at Vega Baja.

== History ==
In 1850, Manuel Lopez Landron founded the Hacienda San Vicente. After his death, his widow married Leonardo Igaravidez Maldonado (Vega Alta, 1830–1888), marquis of Cabo Caribe, who bought the neighboring plantations of Felicidad, Santa Inés, Fe and Rosario. He bought French machinery that allowed integration of the sugarcane fabrication process into a fully mechanized production flow. On January 30, 1872, a railroad opened for cane transport from the plantations to the Central.

In 1878, after its bankruptcy for a debt of more than 1 million pesos, the plant was bought by José Gallart. In 1880 four more Centrales operated in Puerto Rico: Luisa, San Francisco, Coloso and Canóvanas. In 1896, Gallart sold it to Rubert Hermanos, who owned four additional plants with the Compañía Fabián, changing its name to Central San Vicente, Inc. In 1935 it had a grinding capacity of 1.500 tons daily, growing to 5,600 tons at 1958. In 1952 it achieve its greatest production, grinding 71.280 tons.

San Vicente closed in 1967, after it was sold to La Corporación Azucarera in 1972 who sold it off in pieces. Some of the machinery was sold to el ingenio la Grecia in Choluteca, Honduras.

The chimney was rebuilt in 1952. Its ruins include two fireplaces, part of an oven, a crane, brick and walls, tanks and parts of a "Farrel" steam engine. It is located in the carr. 688, of the Cabo Caribe neighborhood, Vega Baja.

== See also ==
- Central Coloso
- Central Cortada
- Central Guánica

== Bibliography ==
- Martínez-Vergne, Teresita (1992). Capitalism in Colonial Puerto Rico: Central San Vicente in the Late Nineteenth Century. University Press of Florida. ISBN 978-0-8130-1110-3.
