= Tienda-Almacén Siempreviva =

Historic house in Mayagüez, Puerto Rico

- Casa Sigma Mayagüez
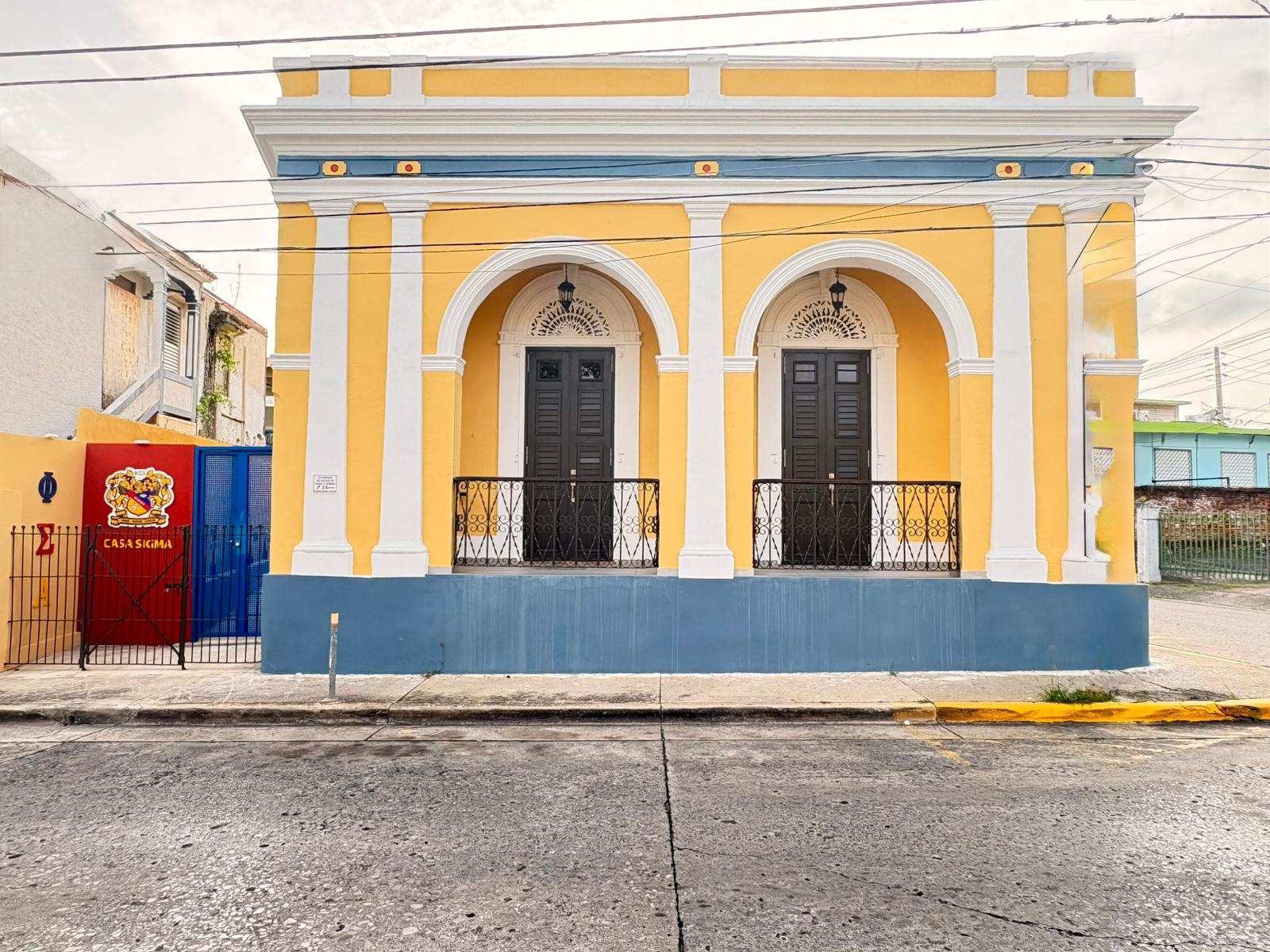

- Location within Puerto Rico
- 18°12′03.07″N 67°08′35.37″W
- Location: Barrio Pueblo, 20 Pablo Casals Street, Mayagüez, Puerto Rico

History
- Built: early 19th century

Site notes
- Architectural style: Neoclasic Creole
- Restored: 2024

Puerto Rico Register of Historic Sites and Zones
- Designated: December 2, 2004
- Reference no.: 2004-29-02-JP-DE

Tienda-Almacén Siempreviva, now Casa Sigma Mayagüez, is a historic building located in Mayagüez, Puerto Rico.

== History ==
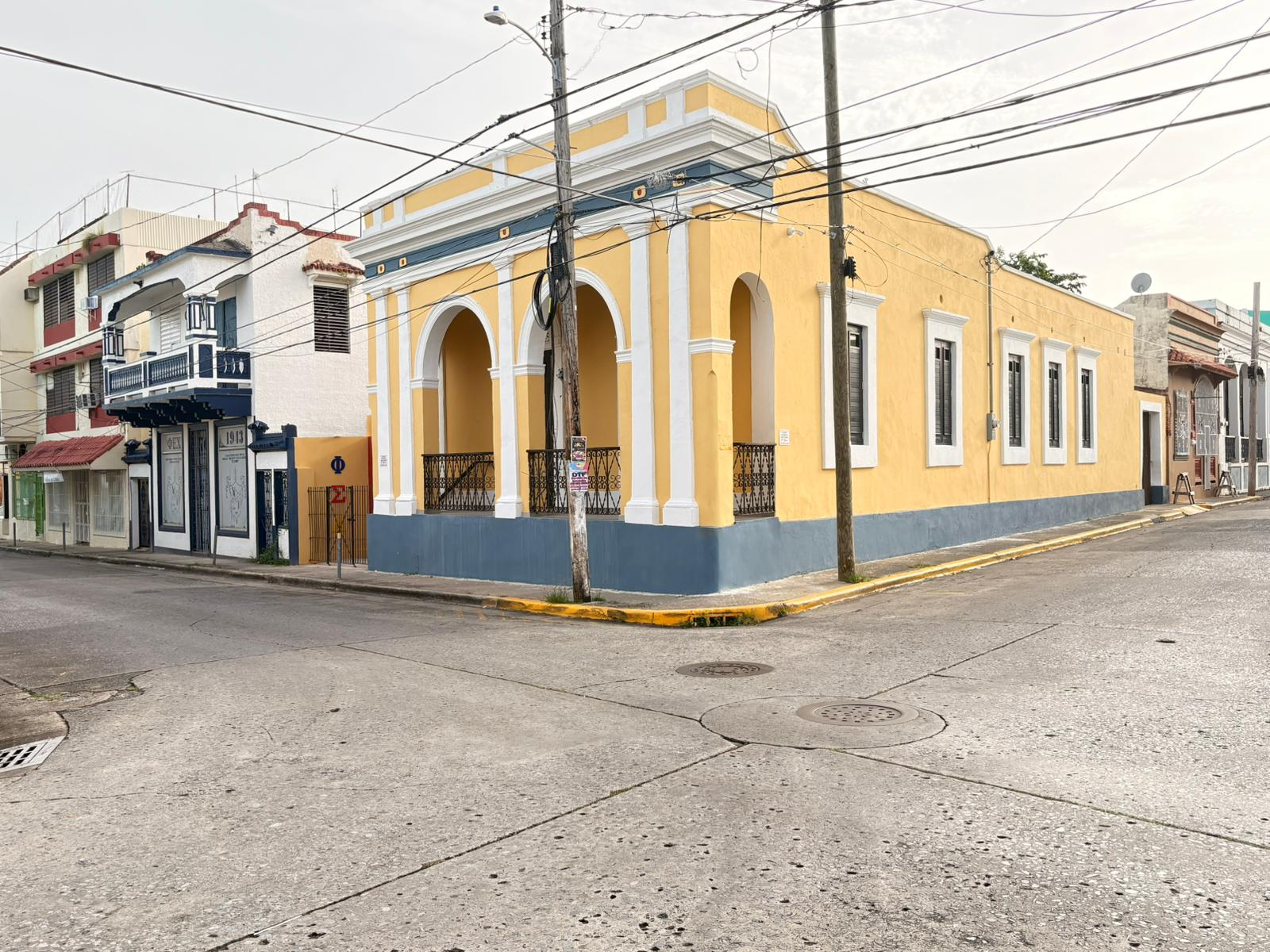
Casa Sigma Mayaguez side view

It was built at the beginning of the nineteenth century in neoclassical Creole style. it is a representative example of a ground floor masonry building for residential use. The property is part of a group of structures said to have been built to house Spanish officers. The houses are located on what became Ernesto Ramos Antonini Street. They were built during the last quarter of the nineteenth century. Their construction followed the rules established for the rebuilding of Villa de Mayagüez, following the Great Fire of 1841. The rules dictated plot size, height, construction materials, and perimeter walls (height and materials), and specified the use of a document outlining approved facade designs.

The lots were distributed giving the owners a term of four to six months for construction. It was forbidden to add a wooden roof, to prevent future fires from spreading easily. These rules marked a transformation and evolution in the urban fabric and architecture of Mayagüez. Most likely because of those rules its architecture has the highest interiors on the island.

The structure operated for many years as the warehouse for La Siempreviva fabric store. In 2004, and after the store closed, the building was designated as a historical building and inducted into the Puerto Rico Register of Historic Sites and Zones by the Puerto Rico Planning Board. In 2022, after many years in disrepair, it was purchased and work began on its reconstruction by a non for profit. It is intended to serve as the gathering space for the Phi Sigma Alpha fraternity. The renovated structure was inaugurated on April 5, 2025.
