= Central Coloso =

Former sugarcane refinery in Aguada, Puerto Rico

Central Coloso de Aguada
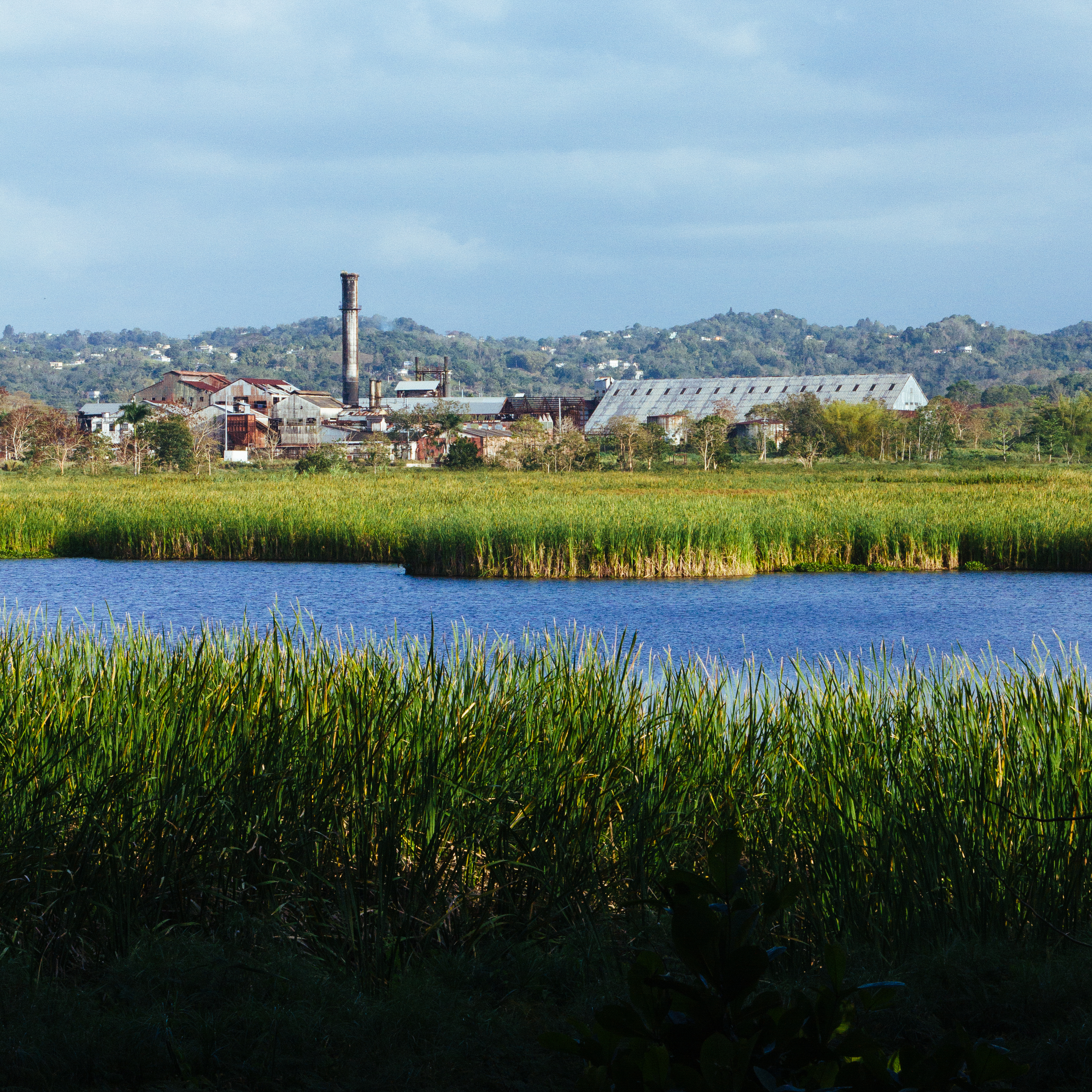
- Coloso y los Cayures en Aguada

- Location within Puerto Rico
- Location: Aguada, Puerto Rico; 18.3811°N 67.1613°W

Refinery details
- Opened: 1820s
- Closed: 2003

Central Coloso, also known as Coloso Sugar Cane Refinery, was a long-running sugarcane refinery in Aguada, Puerto Rico. The refinery was established in late 19th centurythe biggest sugar emporiums in the island. It remained operational until 2003, becoming the last sugarcane refinery to cease operations on the island.

== History ==
=== Early years ===
The Coloso origins begin in the 19th century, specifically towards the end of the 1820s when the Caño de las Nasas estate was founded in Aguada. That estate functioned with a cattle-operated sugar mill producing approximately 100 sugar barrels a day.

In the late 1860s, Emilio Vadí acquired the estate and changed its name to Coloso. In 1875, he changed it into sugar cane refinery.

=== Peak in operations ===
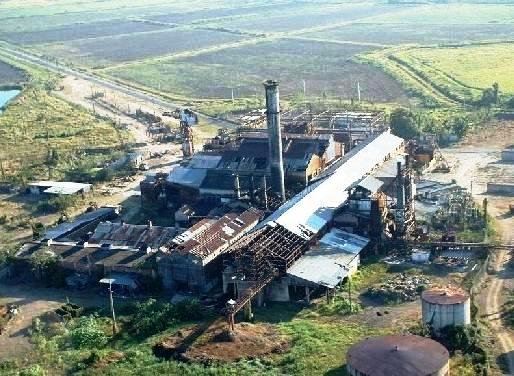
Aerial view of the Coloso Refinery

Upon turning Coloso into a sugarcane refinery, Emilio Vadí mechanized most of the production process. As a result, he produced 1,000 sugar barrels a day. That name increased during the 1870s.

In 1879, Vadí made a partnership with German entrepreneur H. Kuster. Still, due to high debts and the crisis in the sugarcane industry in the late 19th century, Kuster & Vadí sold Coloso to José Arnell Massó in 1897. After buying Central Coloso, Arnell Massó consolidated it with other refinery and sugar mills he had acquired between 1885 and 1895. He also transported the machinery from one of those refineries, Central Monserrate, to Coloso.

As a result of this, Central Coloso ended up covering 4,370 acres, of which approximately 500 were cultivated annually. Coloso also processed sugar that other farmers grew. In 1902, a total of 20,000 sugar sacks were processed. During the peak crop time, workers at Coloso reached 1,500.

In 1904, French investors acquired Coloso and incorporated it under the name of Sucrerie Centrale Coloso de Porto Rico. In 1915, it was bought by West Puerto Rico Sugar Company. In 1921, it became Central Coloso, Inc. At this point, it had around 291 acres. During the next decades, Coloso continued a program of expansion and modernization. In 1952, Coloso had a milling capacity of 5,000 tons of sugar daily. That year, sugar production peaked in the island. In 1961, Coloso reached the highest sugar production tonnage at 73,554 tons.

=== Decline and privatization ===
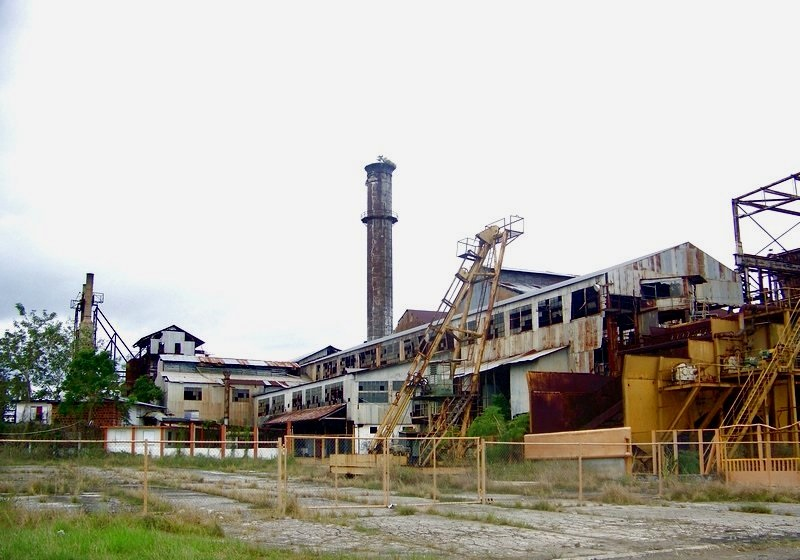
Central Coloso (2010)

The sugar industry started struggling towards the middle of the 20th century due to several reasons: high cost of production, declining sale prices, credit restrictions, and strikes among workers. Another factor was the industrialization of the island, which caused the shift of the local economy to move away from agriculture.

Central Coloso continued to be administered as a private industry until 1972 when the Government of Puerto Rico leased it as part of a program to rehabilitate the sugarcane industry. In 1976, the government acquired Central Coloso through the Corporación Azucarera de Puerto Rico. This agency was created with the purpose of developing, improving, and intensifying the industry.

During the 1980s, most of the sugar mills and refineries in the island had ceased operations, but Coloso maintained a considerable production tonnage. In 1986, sugarcane production was handed down to private companies.

In the 1990s, the government started implementing a program of privatization of the Corporación Azucarera. In 1998, Coloso became the last operating sugarcane refinery in the island when Central Roig in Yabucoa ceased operations. After that, property and assets were transferred to private companies ending in 2000. Coloso continued to process limited sugarcane until 2003 when it officially ceased operations.

=== Legacy ===
Since 1999, Law #275 declared the Central Coloso industrial complex as a historic monument. In 2000, Law #142 declared the Coloso Valley where the refinery is located as an agricultural reserve. Both the refinery and the valley are currently property of the Institute of Puerto Rican Culture. The Coloso Bridge, used for the transport of sugarcane across the Culebrinas River, was added to the National Register of Historic Places on December 29, 2010.

=== Property deeds to residents ===
In 2016, twenty-one families were given property title deeds to Central Coloso land, where they had lived for more than five decades.

== Gallery ==
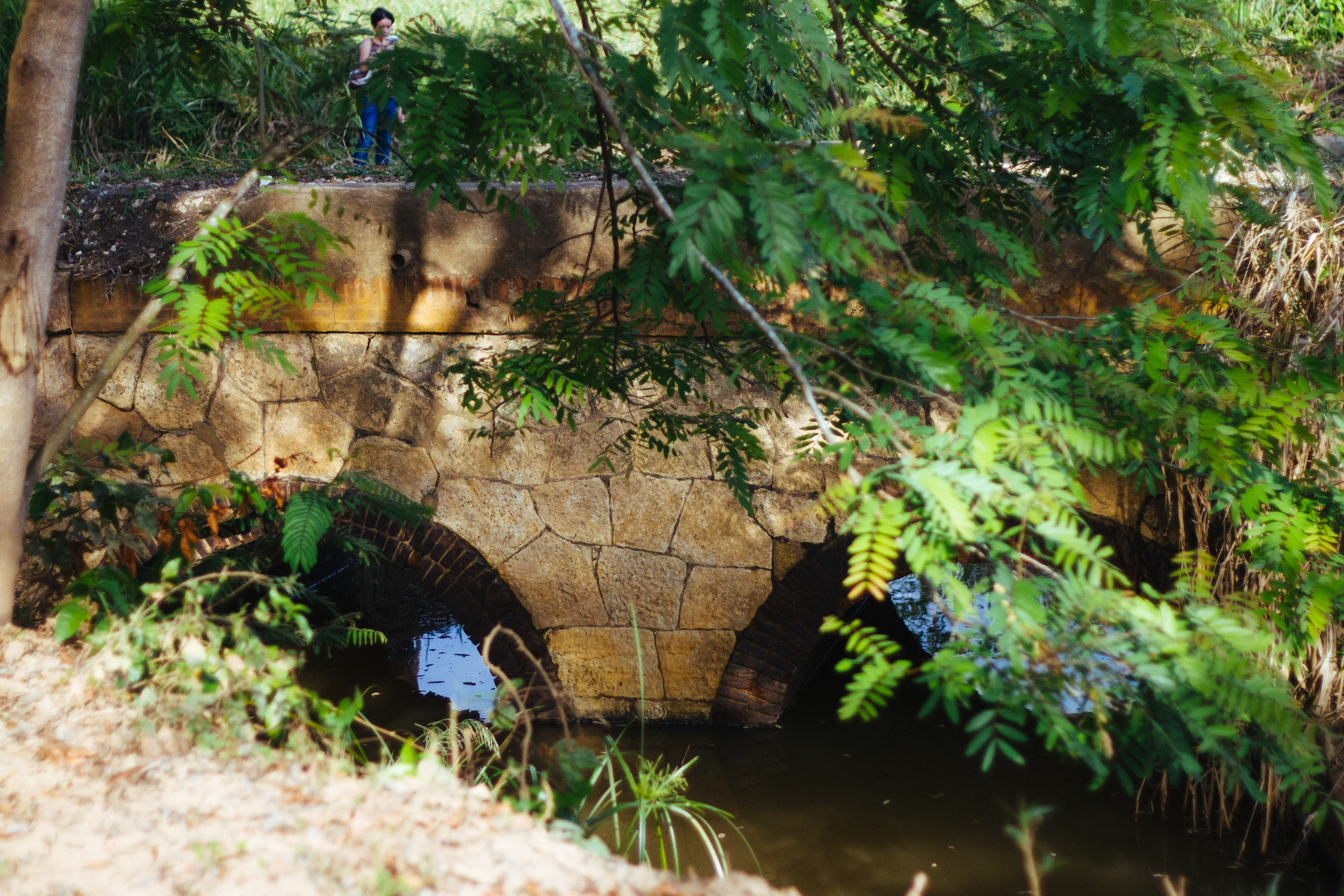
Bridge and track for the train going to Coloso Sugarmill in Aguada

== See also ==
- Central Cortada
- Central Guánica
- Central San Vicente
- Puente de Coloso
- Sugar plantations in the Caribbean
