= Descalabrado River =

River of Puerto Rico

Coordinates: 17.9813543°N 66.4512819°W

- Native name: Río Descalabrado (Spanish)

Location
- Commonwealth: Puerto Rico
- Municipality: Coamo, Juana Díaz, Santa Isabel

Physical characteristics
- Source
  - location: Santa Catalina, Coamo
- Mouth
  - location: Caribbean Sea in Playita Cortada, Descalabrado, Santa Isabel on the municipal border with Juana Díaz

The Descalabrado River (Spanish: Río Descalabrado) is a river of Santa Isabel, Puerto Rico. It also goes through parts of Juana Díaz, and Coamo.

Poecilia sphenops, Guppy, and Awaous banana are some of the fish found in the Descalabrado River.

== See also ==
- List of rivers of Puerto Rico
