= Julian Yan =

Bravos de León
- First baseman / Coach
- Born: July 24, 1965 (age 60); La Romana, La Romana Dominican Republic
- Batted: Right Threw: Right

KBO debut
- 2001, for the Lotte Giants

Last KBO appearance
- 2001, for the Lotte Giants

KBO statistics
- Batting average: .270
- Home runs: 17
- Runs batted in: 62
- Stats at Baseball Reference

Teams
- Chinatrust Whales (1997); Lotte Giants (2001)

Julian Yan (born July 24, 1965) is a Dominican former professional baseball player who spent 22 years playing professionally. Not including winter league totals, he hit 402 home runs. He played in the United States, Canada, Taiwan, Dominican Republic, Mexico and South Korea. Currently, he serves as the hitting coach for the Bravos de León of the Mexican League.

== Career ==
He was born in La Romana, La Romana Dominican Republic. He played in the Toronto Blue Jays minor league system from 1986 to 1994, reaching Triple-A with the Syracuse Chiefs in 1993 and 1994. His home runs totals were, in order: 15, 17, 16, 24, 15, 16 and 16. His 15 home runs in 1986 led the New York–Penn League and his 24 homers in 1989 led the Florida State League. Yan moved to the Montreal Expos system for 1995 and 1996, playing for the Triple-A Ottawa Lynx both seasons. He had 22 home runs in 1995 but only 4 in 1996.

He played in the Mexican League from 1997 to 2000, with stops elsewhere as well. In 1997, he was with the Aguascalientes Rieleros and in 1998, he played for the Reynosa Broncos. He spent 28 games with the independent Atlantic City Surf in 1999, to go along with time spent with the Córdoba Cafeteros and the Chinatrust Whales of the Chinese Professional Baseball League. He posted a .332/.407/.647 slash line for Córdoba in 2000, hitting 38 home runs and leading the league with 129 RBI. He also played 30 games with Atlantic City; between the two clubs, he hit 47 home runs and had 159 RBI. Yan moved to the Korea Baseball Organization in 2001, playing for the Lotte Giants. He hit .270 with 17 home runs.

He spent most of the rest of his career in the Mexican League, hitting 24 home runs for Córdoba in 2002 and 18 home runs for the Puebla Pericos in 2003. He played for the Tabasco Olmecas in 2004. In 2005, he hit 32 home runs for Tabasco, but finished the summer with Atlantic City. Between the clubs, he hit 41 home runs. In 2006, he returned to Tabasco for 18 games. In 2007, his final season, he hit .290 with 30 home runs and 90 RBI at 41 years old for Aguascalientes.

He also spent many seasons playing for the Azucareros del Este of the Dominican Winter League. He managed Córdoba for part of 2002, replacing Julio Cesar Paula. He began 2005 as the Tabasco manager, but was replaced by Mario Mendoza.

== Personal life ==
Yan is of Haitian descent.
