= Pilar Defilló Amiguet =

Puerto Rico-born Catalan musician

- Born: November 11, 1853; Mayagüez, Puerto Rico
- Died: March 11, 1931 (aged 77) Catalonia, Spain
- Occupation: Musician

Pilar Defilló Amiguet (November 11, 1853, Mayagüez, Puerto Rico - March 11, 1931, Catalonia, Spain) was a Puerto Rican and Catalan musician, known as the mother of Enric Casals and Pablo Casals.

== Biography ==
She was the daughter of Joseph Defilló Tusquellas (c.1815 - Mayagüez, 1871) and Raimunda Amiguet Ferrer, who both immigrated to Mayagüez, Puerto Rico in 1849 as political refugees from Catalonia. In Mayagüez, she worked in her father’s shop “El cronómetro” keeping the books until his death in 1871. After her father's death, she emigrated with her mother to El Vendrell, Tarragona, in 1871, where she married Carles Casals Ribes, the pianist and organist from the parroquial church of El Vendrell, after having been an outstanding pupil of his. Her father had belonged to the Secret Abolitionist Society run by Ramón Emeterio Betances, a friend of the family's.

On May 8, 2015, the birthplace of Pilar Defilló at 21 Calle Mendez Vigo in Mayaguez, Puerto Rico, which had been built in 1841 and recently had been restored, opened as the Casa Museo Pilar Defilló, a cultural museum devoted to Pablo Casals.
