= Central Romana Corporation =

Dominican agro-industrial and tourism company

Central Romana Corporation, Ltd.
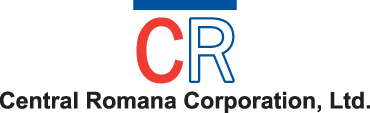
- Company type: Private
- Industry: Agriculture, tourism
- Predecessor: Gulf and Western Americas Corporation
- Founded: 1912
- Headquarters: La Romana, Dominican Republic
- Owner: Fanjul Corp. (35%)
- Website: centralromana.com.do/en

Central Romana Corporation, Ltd. is an agro-industrial and tourism company based in the Dominican Republic.

== History ==
Central Romana Corporation was established in 1912 as a subsidiary of South Puerto Rico Sugar Company. In 1967, South Puerto Rico Sugar was acquired by Gulf and Western Industries, becoming part of its Gulf and Western Americas Corporation division. In 1984, Gulf and Western Americas Corporation was sold to a group of investors including Carlos Morales Troncoso and the Fanjul brothers.

== Controversies ==
In 2022, the government of the United States sanctioned Central Romana Corporation after investigating the company and concluding that it had been using forced labor on its sugarcane fields. The company denied the allegations.

In 2025, the Trump administration lifted the ban on Central Romana. The New York Times noted that, the Fanjul Corporation gave a million dollars to a PAC supporting Trump, as well as $413,000 to the RNC.
