= South Puerto Rico Sugar Company =

Historical Puerto Rican sugar manufacturer

- Formerly: South Porto Rico Sugar Company (1900–1959)
- Company type: Public
- Industry: Agriculture
- Founded: November 15, 1900
- Defunct: 1967
- Fate: Acquired by Gulf and Western Industries
- Successor: Gulf and Western Americas Corporation
- Headquarters: Jersey City, New Jersey, United States
- Subsidiaries: Central Romana By-Products; Central Romana Corporation; Guánica Agricultural Service Company; Magdalena Development Corporation; Okeelanta Sugar

The South Puerto Rico Sugar Company (SPRSCO) was a multinational corporation based in New York. Founded in 1900, it operated in Puerto Rico from 1901 and in the Dominican Republic from 1910.

== History ==
The company was incorporated on November 15, 1900, as the South Porto Rico Sugar Company by German-American businessmen.

In 1901, construction of the Central Guánica sugar mill began.

In 1908, South Porto Rico Sugar acquired Central Fortuna from the Compagnie des Sucreries de Porto Rico for $1,750,000. It was the biggest sugar estate transaction in Puerto Rico at the time.

In 1912, it established the Central Romana Corporation as a subsidiary.

In 1959, South Porto Rico Sugar Company changed its name to South Puerto Rico Sugar Company.

In 1964, South Puerto Rico Sugar Company acquired Okeelanta Sugar Refinery, Inc.

In 1967, South Puerto Rico Sugar Company was acquired by Gulf and Western Industries, becoming part of its Gulf and Western Americas Corporation division.
