= Enric Casals =

Spanish violinist, composer and conductor

Enric Casals i Defilló
- Born: 26 July 1892; Barcelona, Spain
- Died: 31 July 1986 (aged 94) Barcelona, Spain
- Occupations: Violinist, composer, conductor

Enric Casals i Defilló (July 26, 1892 in Barcelona – July 31, 1986), brother of Pablo Casals, was a Spanish violinist, composer and conductor.

== Biography ==
He started to study music with his father, Carles Casals i Ribes. Then, he became a disciple of Rafael Gálvez. Afterwards, he went to Brussels in order to improve his violin and composition skills, with Mathieu Crickboom and Joseph Jongen; and in 1918 he moved to Prague, where he was a pupil of cz:František Suchý. He established the String Quartet "Enric Casals" in 1921, with which he toured Europe, offering concerts in France, Belgium, England, Switzerland and Spain. He played as the solo violinist of the Barcelona Symphony Orchestra (1910 - 1912), the Kurot Symphonische Orchester in Saint Petersburg (1912 - 1914), the Pau Casals Orchester (1920 - 1936) and the Gran Teatre del Liceu (1924 - 1935). He was sub-conductor of the Pau Casals Orchester (1920 - 1936), conductor of the Orquestra Ibèrica de Concerts (1940 - 1942) and the Orquestra Professional de Cambra de Barcelona, with which he conducted almost a hundred concerts. Besides he occasionally conducted other important orchestras around the world, such as the national orchestras of Portugal, Mexico, Hungary, Greece, and the Lamoureux Orchestra of Paris. He was founder and director of the Musical Institute Casals and responsible of the famous Prades Festivals (especially between 1955 and 1983).

== Works ==
- Violin Concerto
- Concerto for cello and orchestra
- Suite in D minor: Tribute to Pau Casals (1973), for cello

=== Sardanes ===
- A en Juli Garreta (1924), with the melody of Els Segadors
- Angoixa (s/d), amb la melodia d'Els Segadors
- Barcelona (1976)
- Catalunya avant (1910), with popular melodies (Rossinyol que vas a França)
- Cants de tardor
- Dramàtica, composed for orchestra
- Era una vegada (1935)
- Festa (1920)
- La font del Penedès (1954)
- Heroica (1919), dedicated to his brother Pablo
- Íntima (1920)
- Lleida a la Verge de Granyena (1976), for choir and cobla
- Lluny...! (1918), written in Montevideo
- La mainada de Sant Salvador (1928), with the melodies of Senyor Ramon and 'El General Bum-Bum
- Montserrat en primavera (1968), sardana upon request, with melodies of Montserrat
- Mònica
- La nena galana (1908)
- La platja de Sant Salvador, it's another title for the sardana La mainada de Sant Salvador
- Recordant Conrad Saló, a different title for the sardana Íntima
- Sardana de carrer (1927)
- La sardana dels Tres Reis (1983), for choir and cobla
- Setembre (1924)
- Tarragona (1927)
- Tres amors (1949)
- Trista (1925)
- El Vendrell (1948)

=== Instrumentations of compositions ===
- Juny, of Juli Garreta, arranged for symphony orchestra

==== Instrumentations of compositions of Pablo Casals ====
- El cant dels ocells, popular Catalan song harmonized by Pablo Casals
- Himne de les Nacions Unides
- El Pessebre, oratorio
- Sant Martí del Canigó, sardana
