= Paramount Television Service =

Unrealized American television network

- Type: Unrealized broadcast television network
- Country: United States
- Availability: Unlaunched
- Founded: April 1978; 48 years ago by Barry Diller
- Owner: Gulf+Western
- Parent: Paramount Pictures
- Key people: Charles Bluhdorn; Barry Diller; Martin Davis; Richard Frank; Michael Eisner; Jeffrey Katzenberg; Mel Harris
- Former names: Paramount Programming Service

The Paramount Television Service (PTS or PMTS for short and also known as Paramount Programming Service) was the name of a proposed but ultimately unrealized "fourth television network" from the U.S. film studio Paramount Pictures (then a unit of Gulf+Western, now owned by Skydance). It was a successor to the earlier Paramount Television Network of the 1950s, and forerunner of the later UPN (the United Paramount Network), which launched 17 years later.

== History ==
In 1974, Barry Diller started his tenure as the Chairman and Chief Executive Officer of Paramount Pictures Corporation. With Diller at the helm, the studio produced television programs such as Laverne & Shirley (1976), Taxi (1978), and Cheers (1982). With his television background, Diller kept pitching an idea of his to the board: a fourth commercial network.

Paramount Pictures purchased the Hughes Television Network including its satellite time in planning for PTS in 1976. They also hired Rich Frank of KCOP-TV and a member of the Operation Prime Time steering committee. Plans relating to the proposed launch of the Paramount Television Service were first announced on June 17, 1977. Set to launch in April 1978, its programming would have initially consisted of only one night a week. Thirty "Movies of the Week" would have followed Star Trek: Phase II on Saturday nights. Also planned was a series derived from Paramount's version of The War of The Worlds (1953) as "backup" for Phase II; a pilot presentation was completed by the film's producer George Pal. PTS was delayed until the 1978-79 season due to cautious advertisers. Shortly before the launch, the company signed affiliation deals with Metromedia, Field Communications and Meredith Corporation to bring their stations to the Paramount service.

At the time, Star Trek was being broadcast on 137 stations in the United States in syndication, and it was expected that the new Trek television series could anchor a new fourth national commercial TV network in the United States; Diller and his assistant Michael Eisner had hired Jeffrey Katzenberg to manage Star Trek into production with a television film due to launch the new series at a cost of $3.2 million – which would have been the most expensive television movie ever made.

Despite Barry Diller's best efforts, the Paramount board, and studio chief Charles Bluhdorn, passed on the network, as Bluhdorn worried that PTS would lose too much money. Six months before the launch, Paramount canceled the network before PTS was set to debut. Ultimately, Star Trek: Phase II was transformed into Star Trek: The Motion Picture (1979). Diller then took his fourth network idea with him when he moved to 20th Century Fox to start the Fox Broadcasting Company.

Meanwhile, Paramount, long successful in syndication with repeats of Star Trek, also found audiences with several popular first-run syndicated series by the turn of the 1990s, in Entertainment Tonight, Hard Copy, Webster (which moved to syndication from ABC for its last two seasons), The Arsenio Hall Show, Friday the 13th: The Series, War of the Worlds (unrelated to the 1970s attempt) and Star Trek: The Next Generation.

On February 9, 2017, Viacom announced that Spike TV would take on the new branding of the Paramount Network in early 2018, as the company switched to a focus on six prime ViacomCBS brands with most of the company's backing and resources.

== See also ==
- List of Paramount executives
- Star Trek: The Motion Picture#Origins
- Star Trek: Phase II
- Paramount Television
  - CBS Paramount Television
- Paramount Television Network
- UPN
- The CW Television Network
- Fourth television network
