= Cinema International Corporation =

Defunct global distributor of American films

- Type: Joint-venture
- Founded: 1970; 56 years ago
- Defunct: 1981; 45 years ago
- Fate: Merged with United Artists International to form United International Pictures
- Successor: United International Pictures
- Products: Film
- Owner: Each of 50% owned by: Paramount Pictures (Gulf+Western); Universal Pictures (MCA)
- Divisions: CIC Video

Cinema International Corporation (CIC) was a film distribution company started by Paramount Pictures and Universal Pictures in the early 1970s to distribute the two studios' films outside the United States – it even operated in Canada before it was considered part of the "domestic" market. During the 1970s, CIC was the "most important agent of overseas distribution" for American films. In 1981, CIC merged with United Artists' international units and became United International Pictures. The formation of CIC, and the profit-sharing arrangement that made it work, has been described as the product of "revolutionary thinking".

== Overview ==
Paramount's early history with MCA dates back to the 1950s, when part of its talent pool worked for Paramount Pictures; Alfred Hitchcock was among the best known. In 1958, MCA purchased the Paramount sound feature film library from 1929 to 1949. In 1962, MCA purchased Universal Pictures. In 1966, Gulf+Western purchased Paramount.

Paramount had sought to merge its international operations with 20th Century Fox in the late 1960s to save the expenses of releasing films internationally, as they felt the costs of international distribution by individual companies was insufficiently profitable to be sustained, but their attempt did not succeed.

In February 1970, Gulf+Western chairman Charles Bludhorn was on a flight with Henri Michaud, the president of Paramount International, who suggested that they contact Lew Wasserman, chairman of MCA-Universal, on arrival in Los Angeles. Bludhorn and Wasserman met for lunch that day and agreed to merge their international operations into a new company. Cinema International Corporation (CIC) was created July 1, 1971, incorporated in the Netherlands for tax purposes, but with its head office in London. Michaud and Arthur Abeles became co-chairmen. The original scope of distribution for CIC consisted of Europe, South America and South Africa.

In November 1973, Metro-Goldwyn-Mayer closed down its distribution offices and became a partner in CIC, which took over international distribution for MGM's films for an initial ten-year period; this made CIC a fifty-percent shareholder of South Africa's Film Trust, an owner-operator of theaters, which persisted into 1976, when Film Trust bought its way out of the partnership. The theater operating concern co-owned by CIC and Film Trust was called Cinitrust. This had a secondary effect of supporting Paramount and Universal in expanding beyond their singular association in South Africa with Ster. By 1975, CIC was operating in forty-seven countries, and had distribution rights to about forty percent of Hollywood's output. By 1976, Warner Bros. International began working with CIC on international distribution, including in South Africa. Beyond distribution, CIC had ventures with MGM and Warner Bros. International (CIC-MGM and CIC-Warner) for the operation of cinemas outside the United States.

CIC also entered the home video market by forming CIC Video, which distributed Paramount and Universal titles on video worldwide. MGM however, had its own video unit, which later became a joint venture with CBS as MGM/CBS Home Video (later known as MGM/UA Home Video, which was later renamed MGM Home Entertainment).

In 1981, MGM purchased United Artists, but could not drop out of the CIC venture to merge with UA's overseas operations. However, with future film productions from both names being released domestically through the MGM/UA Entertainment plate, CIC decided to merge with UA's international units and reformed as United International Pictures on November 1. By this time, CIC was one of the two largest distribution companies in the British Isles, the other being Columbia-EMI-Warner Distributors.

The CIC name lived on in its video division, which became directly managed as a joint venture of Paramount Home Video and MCA Videocassette, Inc. (later MCA Home Video and MCA/Universal Home Video). CIC Video survived until 1999, when Universal purchased PolyGram Filmed Entertainment and reorganized its video division under the Universal name, while Paramount took over full ownership of CIC Video and merged it under its own video division.

CIC also served as the theatrical distributor of Disney films in some territories such as Italy and Brazil during the 1970s to mid-1980s, when it changed its corporate name to UIP.

== Controversy ==
Practices conducted through CIC have come to be considered anti-competitive and likely would have run afoul of anti-trust laws if conducted in the United States.

CIC made headlines in 2012 because both Universal Pictures and Paramount Pictures denied ownership of director William Friedkin's film, Sorcerer. The studios claimed they transferred ownership to CIC, which later dissolved, causing the rights to be in limbo. In April 2012, Friedkin sued the studios to discover who owned the domestic theatrical rights and to capture any royalty payments from VHS and DVD releases. At one point, a court date for March 2013 was set if the parties could not reach a settlement. However, it was exactly that month that Friedkin revealed that he had dropped his lawsuit against Universal and Paramount, and that he and a "major studio" (which was later revealed as Warner Bros.) were involved in the creation of a new, recolored digital print of Sorcerer, to be screened at the Venice Film Festival and to receive a Blu-ray release:

We're working off the original negative, which is in pretty good shape, but without changing the original concept we have to bring it back in terms of color saturation, sharpness and all the stuff... [The film's] been in a legal whirlpool for 30 or 35 years. And a lot of people have come and gone from the studios during that time, so it just takes awhile to unravel everything, but we're very close to announcing a premiere date.

== Filmography ==
=== Film series ===
Title	Release date	No. of films	Studio(s)	Notes
Love Story	1970–78	2	Paramount	
Airport	1970–79	4	Universal	
The Godfather	1972–74	2	Paramount	Co-production with Alfran Productions and The Coppola Company
American Graffiti	1973–79	2	Universal	Co-production with Lucasfilm
Emmanuelle	1974–77	3	Paramount (Note: Released in France under Parafrance Films label)	French films
Jaws	1975–78	2	Universal	Co-production with Zanuck/Brown Company
Peanuts	1977–80	2	Paramount	Co-production with Bill Melendez Productions, Lee Mendelson Film Productions and United Feature Syndicate

== Notes ==
Studio notes

== See also ==
- United International Pictures
