= Gulf and Western Industries =

American conglomerate (1934–1989)

Gulf and Western Industries, Inc.
- Formerly: Michigan Bumper Corporation (1934–1955); Michigan Plating and Stamping Company (1955–1958); Gulf and Western Corporation (1958–1960)
- Type: Public
- Traded as: NYSE: GW; S&P 500 component (1957-1989)
- Industry: Conglomerate
- Founded: 1934; 92 years ago (as the Michigan Bumper Corporation)
- Founder: Charles Bluhdorn
- Defunct: 1989; 37 years ago
- Fate: Asset management; rebranded as Paramount Communications in 1989
- Successor: Paramount Communications
- Headquarters: New York City, United States
- Key people: Alexander N. Brainard, Alvaro L. Carta, Barry Diller, Carl E. Anderson, Carlos Morales Troncoso, Charles Moore, Charles S. Lowry, David Rosen, Dominic Tampone, Don Gaston, Everett L. Kelly, E. W. Kelley, Francis Levien, Frank V. Rogers, Frank Yablans, George Granger, Harold L. Glasser, Harold U. Zerbe, Harry E. Gould, Hayao Nakayama, James E. Poole, James I. Spiegel, J. D. Barnette, Jim Judelson, Joel Dolkart, John H. Duncan, John A. Leone, J. Robert Baylis, Judd Leighton, Lawrence E. Levinson, Lindsay F. Johnson, Martin S. Davis, Merrill L. Nash, Michael Eisner, Norman B. Parker, O. C. Carmichael Jr., Paul R. Dupee Jr., Philip Levin, Raymond D. Slavin, Reece A. Overcash Jr., Richard Snyder, R. L. McCann, Robert Evans, Rolando Gonzalez-Bunster, Samuel J. Silberman, Stanley Jaffe, Sidney Hack, Teobaldo Rosell, T. H. Neyland, Thomas S. Perry
- Subsidiaries: List: Agrícola Panamericana; Airborne Research & Development; Aros N.V.; Autoparts Finance Company; Auto Precision Parts; Auto Spring & Supply; Banco Hipotecario de la Construcción; Car Parts Depot; Central Auto Parts Warehouse; Central de Envases; Chas. S. James; Compañía Agrícola Santipera; Corporación de Hoteles; Corporación Financiera Asociada; Costasur Dominicana; Dawn Industries; Detroit Supply Company; East Carolina Auto Parts; Enjex Mineração; Enrico Manufacturing; Far East Leasing Company; Farmers Produce; Fifty-Sixth Century Antrim Iron Works Company; Florida Cycle Supply Company; Francis Caird; Fred Campbell Auto Supply Company; Gilwise; Glasgow Industries; Gloucester Titanium Company; Gulf Automotive Supply; Harolds Auto Supply; Harrisburg Autoparts Company; Hartung, Kuhn & Co.; Hoteles de la Costa; International Cycle Supply Company; International Raw Materials; J. J. Gibson Company; Jobbers Service Warehouse; J. W. Myers & Company; Ketring Products; Klock Company; Laird Forge; Le Par Engineering; Madison Square Garden Corporation; Marathon Automotive Products; M. B. Manufacturing Company; Metalmeg; Mid-Tennessee Services Company; Motor Supply; O.J. Marine Supply; Overseas, S.A.; Paramount Pictures; Patten Sales; Pompano Packing Company; Producciones Automotrices; Rich-Wing Corporation; Santipera del Caribe; Simon & Schuster; Spencer Auto Electric; Standard Auto Parts; Stofin, Inc.; Tassell Industries; The Kettlewell Company; Tool Industries; United Platers; Venezuelan Supply Company; Warehousing Service; Wheels, Inc.; Windsor Bumper Company; Wood Tire & Supply; Youngflex S.A.

Gulf and Western Industries, Inc. (stylized as Gulf+Western) was an American conglomerate. The company originally focused on manufacturing and resource extraction, but it began purchasing a number of entertainment companies beginning in 1966 and continuing through the 1970s. Most notable among the acquisitions were film studio Paramount Pictures in 1966, television studio Desilu Productions in 1967, arcade and later videogame manufacturer Sega in 1969, book publisher Simon & Schuster in 1975, and a number of music labels including Dot Records (a subsidiary of Paramount at the time of purchase). Some of these properties were reorganized under the Paramount brand, with Dot Records becoming the nucleus of Paramount Records and Desilu being renamed Paramount Television.

The company pivoted to focus on entertainment and publishing, selling off its other assets through the course of the 1980s. Gulf and Western rebranded itself as Paramount Communications in 1989.

A controlling interest in Paramount Communications was purchased by Viacom in 1994, and the entertainment assets of Gulf and Western are today part of the media conglomerate Skydance Corporation.

== History ==
=== Bluhdorn period ===
Gulf and Western's origins date to the 1934 founding of the Michigan Bumper Corporation. In 1955, the company changed its name to Michigan Plating and Stamping Company, and later in 1956 it was taken over by Charles Bluhdorn. In 1957, Michigan Plating and Stamping acquired the Beard & Stone Electric Company of Houston, Texas, and changed its name to Gulf and Western Corporation in 1958. Bluhdorn treated this name change as the company's "founding" for the purpose of later anniversaries. The name reflected its operations in Houston near the Gulf of Mexico and the intent to serve the growing automotive industry in the Western United States. It was changed once again in 1960 to Gulf and Western Industries.

Under Bluhdorn, the company diversified into a variety of businesses that included agriculture, apparel, building products, entertainment, financial services, home and consumer products, natural resources, and publishing. A partial list of Gulf and Western's holdings between 1958 and 1982 with the year of acquisition in parentheses:

=== 1950s ===
- J. A. Walsh (1959)
- Lester Battery & Electric Company (1959)
- Unicord (1959), a manufacturer of electric transformers that would later begin marketing a line of amplifiers under the name of Univox.

=== 1960s ===
- Mal Tool and Engineering Company (1960)
- Hendrie & Bolthoff Manufacturing & Supply Company, including Casper Supply Company subsidiary (1961)
- Scheufler Supply Company (1961)
- Allbright's Auto Parts (1962)
- E. S. Youse Company, including Bee, Inc. and Y. A. Yerger, Inc. subsidiaries (1962)
- Gaul, Derr & Shearer Company (1962)
- General Products Corporation, acquired from Marco Hecht (1962)
- Guaranteed Parts, acquired from Marco Hecht (1962)
- H. M. Parker & Son (1962)
- L. J. Messers Company, including Kanebco and P. Sorensen Manufacturing subsidiaries (1962)
- Merson Musical Products (1962)
- Ocram Corporation, acquired from Marco Hecht (1962)
- Randco, acquired from Marco Hecht (1962)
- William & Harvey Rowland Company (1962)
- Rocket Jet Engineering Corporation (1963)
- Thomas S. Perry Company, including Jobbers Gasket Service subsidiary (1963)
- Wonstop Automotive Warehouse and B.K.S. Corporation, acquired from B.K. Sweeney Manufacturing Company (1963)
- Amplifier Corporation of America (1964)
- Crampton Manufacturing Company (1964), including Angle Steel, Bay Castings, Chase Manufacturing, Conrad, Grand Rapids Brass and Scott's subsidiaries
- East Side Plating Company (1964), a bumper plating company of Windsor, Ontario, Canada. Gulf and Western also owned the similarly named East Side Stamping Company.
- Foxcraft Products Corporation (1964)
- Miller Manufacturing Company, including Crawford Steel, Bonney Forge, Buckeye Forge, Huntingdon Machine and Monroe Steel Castings subsidiaries (1964)
- Philmont Pressed Steel, including Kamis Engineering Company subsidiary (1964)
- Barr, Thomson & Company (1965)
- Detroit Body Products (1965)
- Furniture City Plating Company (1965)
- Lenape Hydraulic Pressing & Forging Company, acquired from Charles Moore (1965)
- Rea Auto Supply (1965)
- Winkler Auto Parts (1965)
- General Plastics (1966)
- H. Koch & Sons (1966)
- O & S Bearing & Manufacturing (1966)
- Paramount Pictures (1966)
- The New Jersey Zinc Company (1966), including its Chestnut Ridge Railway Company, Palmer Water Company, Saucon Valley Iron and Railroad Company and Vernon Minerals subsidiaries, the stake in its Quebec Iron and Titanium joint venture with Kennecott, and the Eagle and Austinville mines it acquired when it merged with the Empire Zinc Company and the Bertha Mineral Company, respectively. The Eagle mine was designated a Superfund site after its closure, and Viacom International was identified by the EPA as the successor in interest to the mine. The Austinville mine is currently owned by the Austinville Limestone Company.
- Universal American Corporation, including American Pulley, Amron, Bingham Stamping, Bohn Aluminum and Brass, Butterworth Manufacturing, Daybrook-Ottawa, Hardie, Hubbard Spool, Livingston-Graham, Morse Cutting Tools, Norma-Hoffman, Pullman Flexolators, Super Tool, Utility Metal Products, Van Norman and Young Spring & Wire subsidiaries (1966)
- Alloy Flange and Fittings (1967)
- Collyer Insulated Wire (1967)
- Hedman Mines (1967)
- Mount Clemens Metal Products Company (1967)
- North & Judd Manufacturing Company, including Con-Torq, Hook-Flex and Wilcox, Crittenden & Company subsidiaries (1967)
- Scott-Mattson Farms, including Abaco Farms subsidiary (1967)
- South Puerto Rico Sugar Company (1967), a holding company in Jersey City, New Jersey, with a principal subsidiary, called South Porto Rico Sugar Company, a cane sugar refiner in Ensenada, Guánica, Puerto Rico which owned the Central Guánica, purported to once be the largest cane sugar refinery in the world. South Puerto Rico Sugar Company also owned Guánica Agricultural Service Company, Okeelanta Sugar of Okeelanta, Florida, Central Romana Corporation of La Romana, Dominican Republic, Magdalena Development Corporation and Central Romana By-Products, which produced furfural.
- Taylor Forge & Pipe Works (1967)
- Associates Investment (1968), including Capitol Life Insurance Company, Emmco Insurance Company, Excel Insurance Company and First Bank & Trust Company of South Bend subsidiaries
- Atlas Metal Products (1968)
- Brown Company, including Cheverton & Laidler, Monarch Match Company, Saifecs, Superior Match Company subsidiaries and Linweave line of fine papers (1968)
- Chicago Thoroughbred Enterprises, acquired from Marjorie L. Everett (1968)
- Consolidated Cigar Corporation (1968), including Columbia Engineering, Consolidated Caguas, Consolidated Cigar Corporation of Cayey, Flinchbaugh Products, Orbit Tool & Die, Sentinel Plastics, Simon Cigar and N.V. Willem II Sigarenfabrieken subsidiaries. Gulf and Western would also later establish Consolidated Domingo to produce cigars in the Dominican Republic.
- E. W. Bliss Company (1968), including Eagle Signal, Gamewell, Good Roads Machinery, Mackintosh-Hemphill and Rockwood subsidiaries. Gamewell was later merged with Alarmtronics Engineering (another Gulf and Western subsidiary), creating the Gamewell/Alarmtronics division.
- Gardner Clark Spring Company (1968)
- General Steel Products (1968)
- Marion Plant Life Fertilizer Co. (1968)
- North Brevard Cable Television Company (1968)
- Orange CATV (1968)
- Providence Washington Insurance Company, including Motor Vehicle Casualty Company, Texas Casualty Insurance Company, Western Alliance Insurance Company and York Insurance Company subsidiaries (1968)
- WCM Machine Works (1968)
- Sega (1969)

=== 1970s ===
- Eagle A (1970)
- Auto Body Parts Corporation (1971)
- Camino Tours (1971)
- Bayamon Body Parts (1971)
- Guayama Body Parts (1971)
- Newport Supply Company (1971)
- Piezas Europeas (1971)
- Aye & Stearns (1972)
- Budget Finance Plan (1972)
- Fabrica Accumulatori Uranio (1972)
- Fun In The Sun Tours (1972)
- Hawaiian Polynesia Tours (1972)
- John M. Henderson & Company (1972)
- Newport Supply Company (1972)
- Shattuck Denn Mining Corporation, including Fireproof Products Company and Richmond Screw Anchor Company subsidiaries (1972)
- Symons Corporation (1972)
- Plavica (1973)
- Preferred General Agency of Alaska (1973)
- Sterling Pulp & Paper Company (1973)
- Behm, acquired from Pott Industries (1974)
- Elco Corporation (1974)
- Fab-co Metals, acquired from Pott Industries (1974)
- Hawtin & Partners (1974)
- Société de Construction Mécanique de Bourgogne, acquired from Dujardin Montbard Somenor (1974)
- Kayser-Roth Corporation (1975), a clothing company that owned Miss Universe Inc. because it had bought Pacific Mills, which had invented the pageant to promote its Catalina swimwear brand. The acquisition of Kayser-Roth also included Hammacher Schlemmer, which it had bought in 1960.
- Simon & Schuster and by extension Pocket Books, Monarch Press and Washington Square Press (1975)
- Her Majesty Industries, a children's wear manufacturer (1976)
- Peavey Paper Mills (1976)
- Solar Fuel Company (1976)
- Madison Square Garden and by extension the New York Rangers, New York Knicks and Holiday on Ice, the O'Hare Hilton Hotel in Chicago, the Arlington Park, Roosevelt Raceway and Washington Park horse race tracks, and real estate in Manhattan, Long Island and Chicago (1977)
- Société des Blancs de Zinc de la Méditerranée (1977)
- Gremlin Industries (1978), including Noval subsidiary. Later renamed Sega Electronics, Inc.
- Compañía Insular Tabacalera (1979)
- Canaries Cigar and Tobacco (1979)
- Esco Trading (1979)
- Simmons Company, including Bloomcraft, Greeff Fabrics, Katzenbach and Warren, Raymor/Moreddi, Selig Manufacturing and York-Hoover subsidiaries (1979)
- Wallace Metal Products (1979)

=== 1980s ===
- National Casket Company, acquired from Walco National Corporation (1980)
- Thomas Ryder & Son, of Bolton, England, a machine tool manufacturing company, acquired from Whitecroft (1981)

=== Minority stakes ===
Gulf and Western also owned minority stakes in Camino Gold Mines, Cementos Nacionales, Fertilizantes Santo Domingo, Flying Diamond Oil Corporation, Jonathan Logan, J.P. Stevens & Company, Matadero del Este, Mohasco Corporation, Alberto-Culver, Amfac, B.F. Goodrich, Brunswick Corporation, Bulova, Cluett Peabody & Company, Cummins, Fratelli Fabbri Editori, General Tire, Libbey-Owens-Ford, Munsingwear and Uniroyal, among other companies.

=== Other activities ===
At the time of its acquisition by Gulf and Western in 1966, Paramount was struggling with heavy losses from feature film productions and had stopped producing television programs. However, it had valuable hidden assets, such as extensive real estate holdings and a library of old movies that could be sold to television networks for large profits. After paying $125 million for Paramount, Gulf and Western saw its sales improve to $450 million, elevating the company to the top 110 U.S. manufacturing companies. Bluhdorn appointed himself as chief executive officer, chairman, and president of Paramount and promoted Martin S. Davis to chief operating officer and executive vice president. The acquisition of Paramount was a significant move in Gulf and Western's diversification strategy and allowed the company to expand into the entertainment industry.

With the Paramount acquisition, Gulf and Western became parent company of the International Telemeter Corporation, the Canadian Famous Players movie theater chain, the Dot Records label, the Famous Music publishing company (created in 1928 by Famous Players–Lasky Corporation, Paramount's predecessor), and the Famous Studios animation studio (which would be shut down almost immediately after the acquisition). After Stax Records was acquired in 1968 (along with sister label Volt Records and East Publishing Company), it became a subsidiary of Dot, although Dot was not at all mentioned on the label (rather, Dot and Stax were noted as subsidiaries of Paramount). Later on, the record operation was moved under Famous Music.

In 1967, New Jersey Zinc constructed a diammonium phosphate fertilizer plant in DePue, Illinois, which was later leased and then bought outright by Mobil Chemical. The plant was designated a Superfund site after its closure and CBS and ExxonMobil became the responsible parties for the cleanup. Also in 1967, Gulf and Western purchased Lucille Ball's Desilu Productions library, which included most of her television product, as well as such properties as Star Trek and Mission: Impossible, both of which would rank amongst its most profitable commodities over the years. The three Desilu lots – the original RKO Studios and two Culver City locations – were also included in the sale, but the Justice Department forced Gulf and Western to sell the Culver Studios (which Perfect Film & Chemical Corporation acquired in 1968) to avoid a monopoly. Desilu Productions was renamed Paramount Television and its distribution arm, Desilu Sales, became Paramount Television Sales.

In 1969, Gulf and Western sold Norma-Hoffman to the German company FAG (Fischer Aktien Gesellschaft). Also that year, Gulf and Western Indonesia signed a contract with the Indonesian state owned Pertamina Oil Company to explore oil resources in east Indonesia, and the Dominican government and Gulf and Western Americas Corporation established an industrial free zone in La Romana. The zone was administered by Gulf and Western America's Operadora Zona Franca de La Romana subsidiary.

In the early 1970s, after a lunch meeting between Bluhdorn and Lew Wasserman, Gulf and Western's Paramount and MCA's Universal merged their international operations to create Cinema International Corporation, a joint venture. United Artists later joined the joint venture, which became United International Pictures.

In 1970, Gulf and Western sold a 50% stake in Marathon Studio Facilities to Società Generale Immobiliare and acquired 15 million shares in the company (which represented 10.5 percent of its common stock). Also that year, Casmo Mining Ltd. was incorporated as a subsidiary of New Jersey Zinc, Hubbard Spool was sold to the Wanskuck Company, the Hardie agricultural sprayer line to the Lockwood Corporation, and Stax Records back to its original owners, and with it the rights to all Stax recordings not owned by Atlantic Records. A year before, Dot's non-country music roster and catalog was moved to a newly created label, Paramount Records (the name was previously used by a Paramount Records label unrelated to the film studio; Paramount acquired the rights to that name in order to launch this label). It assumed Dot's status as the flagship label of Paramount's record operations, releasing music by pop artists and soundtracks from Paramount's films and television series. Dot meanwhile became a country label.

In 1971, Tumbleweed Records was formed by Larry Ray and Bill Szymczyk with the financial backing of Gulf and Western. The label was a subsidiary of Famous Music until 1973, when it folded. Also in 1971, Gulf and Western acquired certain assets of Auto Pak Company, Inc.

In 1972, Gulf and Western signed an agreement to provide equipment for the Soviet Union's Kama River truck plant project. As part of the agreement, Gulf and Western's E. W. Bliss division would provide one automated truck parts production line. According to the company, negotiations were under way for six more lines. Also in 1972, Gulf and Western sold its Conrad/Missimer division (which it created after acquiring Missimers in 1968 and merging it with Conrad) to Bemco Inc., Etablissements Daniel Doyen (which had already been a direct subsidiary since the 1960s) to A.P.S. Inc. (another Gulf and Western subsidiary), Angle Steel to Kewaunee Scientific Corporation, and Amron to Weatherby Nasco Inc. in exchange for Weatherby Nasco shares.

Famous Music provided distribution for several independent labels, such as Neighborhood Records and Sire Records. Famous began distributing yet another independent label, Blue Thumb Records, before buying it outright in 1972. In 1974, Gulf and Western sold the entire record operation to the American Broadcasting Company, which continued the Dot and Blue Thumb imprints as subsidiaries of ABC Records, while discontinuing the Paramount label altogether. Also that year, Gulf and Western sold Flinchbaugh Products to Clabir's General Defense subsidiary. and Sega Enterprises, Ltd. was taken public in the United States by making it a subsidiary of another firm owned by Gulf and Western called the Polly Bergen Company (acquired in 1971), which was publicly traded and had become a shell corporation after selling most of its assets to Fabergé. David Rosen was appointed chief executive officer of Polly Bergen, which was renamed Sega Enterprises, Inc.

In 1975, Gulf and Western formed a joint venture with Union Minière of Belgium called Jersey Miniere Zinc Company. Gulf and Western owned a 60% stake in the joint venture, while Union Minière owned a 40% stake. Also in 1975, Gulf and Western's Sega subsidiary bought a 50% stake in Kingdom of Oz, a company that operated arcades in California shopping malls which would later be rebranded as Sega Centers.

In 1976, during the shooting of the film Sorcerer in Villa Altagracia, a lawsuit was filed against Cinema Dominica (a subsidiary of Gulf and Western) by Dominican businessmen for alleged damages. The newspaper El Caribe said that the lawsuit against Cinema Dominica charged that the company had "failed to comply with the rental contract it signed for use of the town's commercial locations." Also in 1976, Caballo Blanco S.A. was established in Bolivia by Gulf and Western and local investors.

In 1977, after acquiring Muntz Manufacturing (a projection TV manufacturer founded by Earl Muntz) the year prior, Sega introduced the Sega-Vision widescreen TV (production was suspended the next year). Also that year, Thai Zinc Ltd. (a subsidiary of New Jersey Zinc) and the government of Thailand signed a contract of a $90 million zinc mine and refinery project after three years of negotiation.

While working for Paramount, Barry Diller had proposed a "fourth network"; ultimately, the Paramount Television Service was cancelled six months prior to launch by Bluhdorn, who feared a major loss of revenue had the network gone forward. As a result, Paramount sold the Hughes Television Network (which it had acquired including its satellite time in planning for PTVS in 1976) to Madison Square Garden in 1979. Diller later left Paramount for 20th Century Fox; that studio's new owner, News Corporation, was interested in starting a network, which became the Fox Broadcasting Company.

=== Early 1980s ===
On June 5, 1980, Gulf and Western unveiled an electric car, powered by a zinc chloride battery that would hold a charge for several hours and permit speeds of up to 60 miles per hour (97 km/h). By year's end, the U.S. Department of Energy (which had invested $15 million in the project) reported that the battery had 65% less power than predicted and could be recharged only by highly trained personnel. Also in 1980, Gulf and Western sold Hammacher Schlemmer to J. Roderick MacArthur's Bradford Exchange and its 80% interest in Brown Company to James River Corporation in return for cash and James River stock. Bluhdorn was confident that James River stock would be more profitable than Brown was for Gulf and Western.

In 1981, former officials of Gulf and Western Natural Resources Group led a buyout of New Jersey Zinc and made it a subsidiary of Horsehead Industries, Inc. That same year, Gulf and Western announced it would shut down its Schrafft Candy subsidiary (which it had acquired from Helme Products in 1974) after it had continued to be unprofitable. Schrafft's was later sold to the American Safety Razor Company.

In 1982, executive vice president Don Gaston (who had also served on the board of Gulf and Western subsidiaries Madison Square Garden, Roosevelt Raceway, Capitol Life Insurance Company, and Providence Washington Insurance Company) formed Richfield Holdings Ltd., an investment group that purchased Providence Capitol International Insurance Ltd. and Famous Players Realty Ltd. from Gulf and Western for $350 million. Gaston resigned from Gulf and Western once the sale was completed. Also in 1982, Gulf and Western sold its Marquette Cement Manufacturing Company subsidiary (acquired in 1976) to Lone Star Industries and Pennsylvania Malleable Iron (acquired in 1969) to Champ Corporation.

In 1983, Bluhdorn died of a heart attack on a plane en route home from the Dominican Republic to New York, and the board bypassed president Jim Judelson and named senior vice president Martin S. Davis, who had come up through Paramount Pictures, as the new chief executive officer, a decision later regretted by board member Barry Diller.

In 1984, Gulf and Western purchased Esquire Inc. (and by extension the Globe Book Company, Allyn & Bacon, Modern Curriculum Press, the Cambridge Company, Centron Corporation, Coronet Films, Perspective Films and MTI Teleprograms), in which it already owned a minority stake, and Prentice Hall. That same year, its Kayser-Roth subsidiary acquired the women’s underwear division of Calvin Klein Industries and the use of the designer’s name for that business.

=== Martin S. Davis restructuring ===
Davis slimmed down the company's wilder diversifications and focused it on entertainment, selling all of its non-entertainment and publishing assets. The idea was to aid financial markets in measuring the company's success, which, in turn, would help place better value on its shares. Though its Paramount division had done very well in recent years, Gulf and Western's success as a whole was translating poorly with investors. This process eventually led Davis to divest many of the company's subsidiaries.

In 1983, Gulf and Western sold Consolidated Cigar to a purchasing group composed by five of its senior managers and headed by its president, Alexander N. Brainard. That same year, Gulf and Western sold its building products operations (Livingston-Graham, Symons Corporation and Richmond Screw Anchor Company) to Merrill L. Nash, E. W. Bliss to a group of investors, and the U.S. assets of Sega (manufacturing division of Sega Electronics, Inc., along with licenses to technology and distribution rights to arcade game library of Sega in the United States for two years) to pinball manufacturer Bally Manufacturing. The Japanese assets of Sega (Sega Enterprises, Ltd., Sega trademarks, and its library of games) were purchased by a group of investors led by David Rosen and Hayao Nakayama the year after. Gulf and Western subsequently folded the former Sega U.S. companies (the old Sega Enterprises, Inc. and Sega Electronics, Inc. were renamed and currently exist as shell companies Ages Entertainment Software LLC and Ages Electronics, Inc., part of CBS Media Ventures) into Simon & Schuster and the old Sega Europe Limited into Paramount Pictures (since renamed several times and currently exist as High Command Productions Limited, part of Viacom International). Ironically, a couple decades later Paramount and Sega would team up to co-produce a film series based on the latter's flagship video game franchise, Sonic the Hedgehog.

In 1984, Gulf and Western divested itself of its many Taylor Forge operations to private owners. Taylor Forge's Somerville, New Jersey, plant became Taylor Forge Stainless, while its facilities in Paola, Kansas, and Greeley, Kansas, became Taylor Forge Engineered Systems. That same year, Bonney Forge was sold to its president John Leone, Super Tool and Morse Cutting Tools to industrialist Jim Lambert, and Gulf and Western's holdings in Florida and the Dominican Republic to an investment group including Carlos Morales Troncoso and the Fanjul brothers.

In 1985, Gulf and Western Consumer and Industrial Products Group – consisting of A.P.S. auto parts, Kayser-Roth clothing and Simmons bedding – was sold to the Wickes Companies. Also that year, it sold its Columbus Circle Investors unit (which acted as the asset manager for the company's pension and employee benefit plans) to Thomson McKinnon and bought Ginn & Company from Xerox.

In 1986, as part of its new corporate strategy to focus on the entertainment and publishing industries, Gulf and Western acquired Mann Theatres (Warner Communications was later brought in as a partner). Also that year, Simon & Schuster acquired Silver Burdett and its GLC (General Learning Corporation) subsidiary. This acquisition was followed by mapmaker Gousha in 1987, and Charles E. Simon and Quercus in 1988. The company, thus restructured, renamed itself Paramount Communications in 1989, and sold Associates First Capital Corporation to the Ford Motor Company.

=== Headquarters ===
Prior to 1970, the company's headquarters were on Madison Avenue in Manhattan.

The Gulf and Western Building (15 Columbus Circle in Manhattan) by Thomas Stanley was built in 1970 for the Gulf and Western company north of Columbus Circle, at the south-western corner of Central Park. The building occupies a narrow block between Broadway and Central Park West and, at 583 feet (178 m), it commands the dramatic view to the north, as well as its immediate surroundings.

The top of the building sported a restaurant, The Top of the Park, which was never a full success even though run by Stuart Levin, famous for the Four Seasons and Le Pavillon and it being graced with Levin's own signature sculpture by Jim Gary, "Universal Woman."

Similarly, the cinema space in the basement, named Paramount after the picture company that Gulf and Western owned, was closed as the building was sold.

Problems with the 45-story building's structural frame gave it unwanted fame as its base was scaffolded for years and the upper floors were prone to sway excessively on windy days, even leading to cases of nausea akin to motion sickness.

The 1997 renovation into a hotel and residential building, the Trump International Hotel and Tower (One Central Park West) by Costas Kondylis and Philip Johnson, involved extensive renovation of both interior and facades. For example, the 45 stories of the original office tower were converted into a 52-story residential building, enabled by the lower ceiling height of residential spaces. The facade was converted with the addition of dark glass walls with distinctive shiny steel framing.

== See also ==
- 2 Columbus Circle
- Altos de Chavón
- Casa de Campo
- Central Romana Port
- CIC Video—A home video distributor established in 1980 as a division of the Cinema International Corporation joint venture, renamed Paramount Home Entertainment (UK) in 1999
- Estadio Francisco Micheli—A stadium located in La Romana that was built by Gulf and Western Americas Corporation and currently belongs to Central Romana Corporation, Ltd.
- History of Sega
- List of Paramount Pictures executives
- One Worldwide Plaza
- Polly Bergen (Founder of the Polly Bergen Company)
- Silent Movie—A Mel Brooks film that parodies Gulf and Western's acquisition of Paramount Pictures
