= Bonney Forge Corporation =

Forge in Pennsylvania, USA

Bonney Forge
- Industry: Manufacturing
- Founded: 1876 as Bonney Vise & Tool Works; name changed to Bonney Forge & Tool Works in 1921.
- Headquarters: Philadelphia, Pennsylvania and Allentown, Pennsylvania (former); Mount Union, Pennsylvania (current)
- Key people: Charles S. Bonney (founder); John A. Leone (current CEO)
- Products: Hand tools (formerly); fittings and valve markets (currently)
- Website: www.bonneyforge.com

Bonney Forge was founded in Philadelphia, Pennsylvania in 1876 by Charles S. Bonney. Originally Bonney Forge crafted forged and finished hardware for horse-drawn wagons, later it became a manufacturer of automotive hand tools, and now it is a manufacturer of fittings and unions, branch connections, steel valves and specialty products.

In 1953, Bonney Forge was taken over by the Miller Manufacturing Company of Detroit, Michigan. In 1964, the firm sold its tool division to Kelsey-Hayes Corp. of Romulus, Michigan. The firm was later acquired by Gulf and Western Industries. Gulf and Western sold the firm to its president John Leone in 1984.

The company was for many years based in Allentown, Pennsylvania, where it had some of its manufacturing operations. Bonney Forge also had manufacturing operations in Alliance, Ohio, Orangeburg, South Carolina and near Milan, Italy.

== Plant closures ==
In March 1964, Bonney Forge closed its manufacturing plant in Allentown after it moved manufacturing operations from there to the Mount Union, Pennsylvania. In August 2001, Bonney Forge closed its manufacturing plant in Allentown because the plant building could not be modernized to handle a new press.

== Distribution ==
Bonney Forge valves are broadly distributed internationally, prominently through HSP Valves in the UK, The Alloy Valve Stockist in Spain, and AIV in the US.

== See also ==
- Taylor Forge (Another former subsidiary of Gulf and Western Industries)
- List of defunct consumer brands
