= Levien Gymnasium =

Columbia University arena

Francis S. Levien Gymnasium
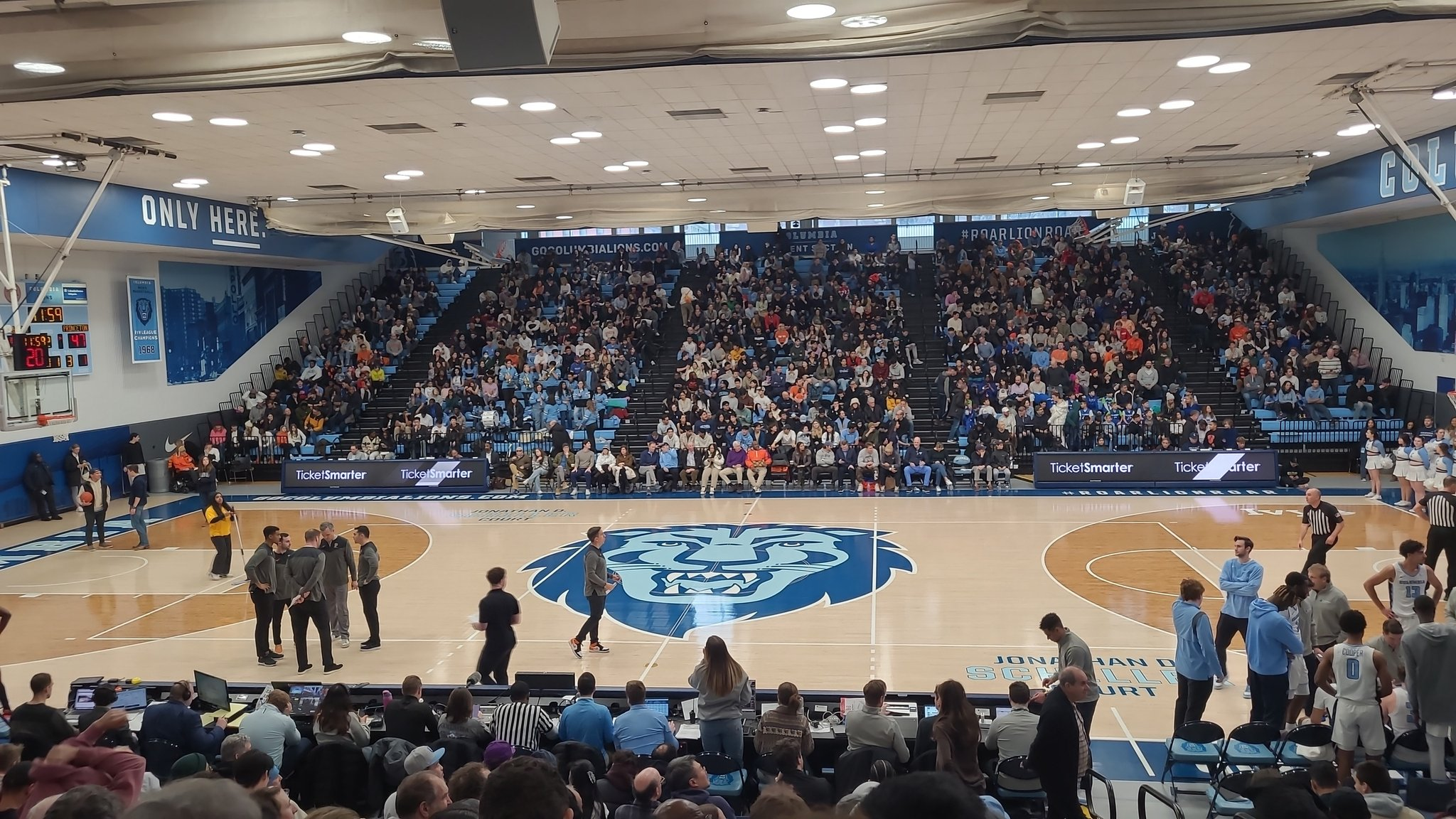
- Interactive map of Francis S. Levien Gymnasium
- Address: 3030 Broadway; New York, NY 10027
- Coordinates: 40.8097897°N 73.9617151°W
- Owner: Columbia University
- Operator: Columbia University
- Capacity: 2,700

Construction
- Groundbreaking: August 1, 1972
- Opened: December 7, 1974
- Cost: $13 million

Tenants
- Columbia Lions (men's and women's basketball)

Francis S. Levien Gymnasium is a 2,700-seat arena at Columbia University in Morningside Heights, Manhattan, New York City. Named for New York lawyer-industrialist Francis S. Levien (1905–95), it is home to the Columbia men's and women's basketball teams and the women's volleyball team. It is also used for gym classes in between games. Part of the Marcellus Hartley Dodge Physical Fitness Center, Levien Gym opened in 1974 as a replacement for the old University Gym, which is still used for intramural sports. The playing court is named in honor of former Columbia basketball player and university trustee Jonathan D. Schiller.

Levien was the host of the 2016 CollegeInsider.com Postseason Tournament championship game and 2024 Ivy League men's and women's basketball tournaments.

== History ==
The gym at Columbia University was considered unsatisfactory as early as 1921, but plans for a new facility were not drawn until 1959. Due to limited space on campus, Columbia originally planned to build this new facility in nearby Morningside Park. Work on that project site ceased after student protests in April 1968. Instead, the project was moved to a new location adjacent to the old gym. Construction began on August 1, 1972, and was completed on December 7, 1974.

== See also ==
- List of NCAA Division I basketball arenas
