= Herbert M. Singer =

American lawyer

Herbert M. Snger
- Born: 1907; Far Rockaway, Queens
- Died: October 9, 1996 (aged 88–89); Manhattan, New York City
- Education: Columbia University (BA, LLB)
- Occupations: lawyer, philanthropist
- Known for: President of Beth Israel Medical Center; Director of PepsiCo; Chairman of the American Jewish Joint Distribution Committee
- Spouse: Nell Hess Singer
- Father: Saul Singer
- Relatives: Edwin Singer (brother)

Herbert M. Singer (1907 – October 6, 1996) was an American lawyer and philanthropist. He was the chairman of the executive committee of PepsiCo and was leader and trustee of many civic organizations including the American Jewish Joint Distribution Committee and Beth Israel Medical Center.

== Early life and education ==
Singer was born in Far Rockaway, Queens in 1907. His father, Saul Singer, originally from Simferopol, Russian Empire, was a garment manufacturer turned real estate entrepreneur and banker who served as the vice president of the Bank of United States, then the fourth largest bank in New York City, and was convicted of fraud after he and the bank's owners depleted its assets through heavy speculation in its own stock and through risky real estate investments, setting off a bank run in 1930 that triggered the collapse of banks during the Great Depression. Singer later moved to Texas and starting up an oil refinery in Corpus Christi, which he later sold to Citgo during the Second World War.

Singer graduated from Columbia College in 1926 and Columbia Law School in 1928. He worked in the law office of Isidor J. Kresel, counsel and a director of the Bank of United States, upon graduating from Columbia, and was indicted with his father following the collapse of the Bank, but his conviction was overturned by the New York Court of Appeals.

== Career ==
Singer then joined forces with Francis Levien, a fellow Columbia alumnus and lawyer. He was a lead lawyer in a landmark suit brought by the Loft Candy Company in 1938 against its chief executive, who bought PepsiCo stock after being approached by the company and was then sued by the company, arguing that the stock should have bought on the company's behalf.

His successful defense of PepsiCo helped him land a spot on the board of directors of PepsiCo in 1941, a position he held until 1953. He was also elected chairman of the executive committee in 1950.

In 1982, he founded the Herbert and Nell Singer Foundation, aimed to support medical and other organizations in New York and Connecticut, where he and his wife had a home.

He was a former president of Beth Israel Medical Center in New York City, a post once held by his father in the 1920s. He was also a chairman of the American Jewish Joint Distribution Committee, a founding president of the Jewish Communal Fund of New York, a trustee of the United Hospital Fund of New York, and a director of the 14th Street-Union Square Local Development Corporation, now known as Union Square Partnership.

Singer sat on the Rockefeller University Council and was credited for bringing together Beth Israel and the university in a research-sharing arrangement.

== Personal life ==
Singer married Nell Hess of Brooklyn in 1945. His wife was also a philanthropist and was the namesake of the Nell Singer Lilac Walk in Central Park.

He died on October 6, 1996, in his Manhattan home at age 89. He was survived by his wife, children, two sisters, and his brother Edwin Singer, a philanthropist in Corpus Christi, Texas who served on the board of The International Herald Tribune in Paris and helped establish the Art Museum of South Texas.
