= Francis Levien =

American lawyer and industrialist

- Born: 1905; New York City, United States
- Died: June 15, 1995 (aged 89–90); New York City, United States
- Other name: Francis S. Levien
- Education: Columbia University (BA, LLB)
- Occupations: Lawyer, industrialist
- Employer: Gulf and Western
- Known for: Namesake of Levien Gymnasium

Francis S. Levien (1905 – June 15, 1995) was an American lawyer and industrialist specialized in the creation of conglomerates. He was a director of Gulf and Western Industries.

== Biography ==
Born in 1905, Levien graduated from Columbia College in 1926 and Columbia Law School in 1928. He began a law practice named Levien, Singer & Neuberger and made a small fortune during the 1930s, when he and his partner, Herbert M. Singer, won a case in Delaware, resulting in the formation of PepsiCo. He was also a shareholder of the company.

He also formed a partnership with the New England paper merchant Harry E. Gould and turned a marginal steelmaker, the Steel Materials Corporation, into a thriving money-maker from World War II military contracts.

In 1950, Levien bought a defunct steel mill in Ohio and put it back in operation as the Ohio River Steel Company. In 1951, Levien and Gould traded their stake in the steel company for control of a printing-ink business, Universal Laboratories. They changed the name of the holding company into Universal American Corporation, which acquired companies such as Bohn Aluminum and Brass, Van Norman and Paul Hardeman before merging into Gulf and Western Industries. Levien subsequently became a director of Gulf and Western until his retirement in 1985. He was also a director of several companies, including Kansas City Southern Industries and 20th Century Fox.

In 1962, he donated $1 million towards building a new gymnasium at Columbia University that was named in his honor.

== Personal life ==
Levien married Janice L. Currick in 1936 at the Savoy-Plaza Hotel. He died on June 15 at Mount Sinai Hospital and was survived by his wife, a daughter, Lorna Lubash, and two grandchildren.
