= List of Paramount Pictures executives =

Paramount Pictures Corporation
- Type: Subsidiary
- Founded: 1912
- Headquarters: Hollywood, Los Angeles, California, United States
- Key people: Josh Greenstein (co-chairman and co-CEO); Dana Goldberg (co-chairwoman and co-CEO) industry = Motion pictures
- Revenue: ▲$3.0 billion USD (2005)
- Operating income: ▼$62.1 million USD (2005)
- Owner: Gulf+Western (1966–1989); Paramount Communications (1989–1994); Original Viacom (1994–2005); Second Viacom (2005–2019); Paramount Global (2019–2025) (known as ViacomCBS from 2019 to 2022); Paramount Skydance Corporation (2025–present)
- Parent: Paramount Motion Pictures Group
- Website: www.paramount.com

The following is a list of Paramount Pictures executives.

== Paramount executives ==
- W. W. Hodkinson
- Hiram Abrams
- Jesse L. Lasky
- Samuel Goldwyn
- Emanuel Cohen
- Ernst Lubitsch
- B. P. Schulberg
- George Weltner
- William LeBaron
- Walter Wanger
- Y. Frank Freeman
- Jacob Karp
- Charles Bluhdorn
- Robert Evans
- David Picker
- Michael D. Eisner
- Martin S. Davis
- Ned Tanen
- Barry London
- John Goldwyn
- Sumner Redstone

=== President ===
- 1912–1935: Adolph Zukor
- 1935–1936: John E. Otterson
- 1936–1964: Barney Balaban
- 1964–1967: George Weltner
- 1967–1971: Charles Bluhdorn
- 1971–1975: Frank Yablans
- 1975–1984: Michael Eisner
- 1984–1990: Sid Ganis
- 1990–2004: Sherry Lansing
- 2004–2007: Gail Berman
- 2007–2025: Brian Robbins

=== Executive Vice President ===
- 1965–1967: Martin S. Davis
- 1967–1977: Stanley R. Jaffe
- 1977–1991: Peter M. Cary
- 1991–after 2001: William Bernstein
- 2001–present: Mark Badagaliacca

=== Senior Vice President ===
- 1993–2000: Mark Badagaliacca

=== Chief Executive Officer ===
- 1974–1984: Barry Diller
- 1984–1991: Frank Mancuso, Sr.
- 1991–2004: Sherry Lansing
- 2004–2017: Brad Grey
- 2017–2021: Jim Gianopulos
- 2021–2025: Brian Robbins

=== Chief Operating Officer ===
- 1970–2006: Stanley R. Jaffe
- 2006–2016: Frederick Huntsberry
- 2016–2022: Andrew Gumpert
- 2022–2025: Brian Robbins

=== Chief Financial Officer ===
- 1997–present: Mark Badagaliacca

=== Chief Marketing Officer ===
- 2011–2014: Josh Greenstein

=== Chairman of the Board ===
- 1935–1964: Adolph Zukor
- 1964–1966: Barney Balaban
- 1966–1974: Charles Bluhdorn
- 1974–1984: Barry Diller
- 1984–1991: Frank Mancuso, Sr.
- 1991–1992: Brandon Tartikoff
- 1992–2005: Jonathan Dolgen
- 2005–2017: Brad Grey
- 2017–2021: Jim Gianopulos
- 2021–2025: Brian Robbins

=== Chairman Emeritus ===
- 1964–1976: Adolph Zukor

=== Vice Chairman ===
- 2008–2016: Rob Moore

=== President, Motion Picture Group ===
- 1984–1988: Ned Tanen
- 1988–1990 Sid Ganis and Barry London
- 1990–1993: David Kirkpatrick and Barry London
- 1993–2009: John Lesher
- 2009–2015: Adam Goodman
- 2015–2017: Marc Evans
- 2017–2020: Wyck Godfrey
- 2020–2021: Emma Watts
- 2021–2025: Mike Ireland and Daria Cercek
- 2025–present: Don Granger

=== Head of Production ===
- 1960–1964: Martin Rackin
- 1964–1966: Howard W. Koch

=== President of Production ===
- 1981—1982: Don Simpson
- 1982—1984: Jeffrey Katzenberg
- 1984—1987: Dawn Steel
- 1987—1991: Gary Lucchesi
- 1991—1997: John Goldwyn
- 1997—2005: Michelle Manning
- 2005—2007: Brad Weston & Allison Shearmur
- 2007—2008: Brad Weston
- 2008—2009: Adam Goodman
- 2010—2015: Marc Evans
- 2015—2020: Elizabeth Raposo
- 2020–2025: Michael Ireland & Daria Cercek

=== Vice President of Production ===
- 1980–1983: Dawn Steel
- 2003–2006: Marc Evans
- 2017–?: Jon Gonda

=== Senior Vice President of Production ===
- 1983—1985: Dawn Steel
- 1985—1994: Michelle Manning
- 2004—2008: Marc Evans
- ?—2022: Jon Gonda
- ?—2022: Vanessa Joyce

=== Executive Vice President of Production ===
- 1994—1997: Archbold Sedney
- 2008—2010: Marc Evans
- 2022—present: Jon Gonda
- 2022—present: Vanessa Joyce

=== Senior Executive Vice President of Production ===
- ?—2022: Ashley Brucks

=== President of Worldwide Marketing ===
- 2018–2019: David Sameth

=== President of Worldwide Marketing and Distribution ===
- 2014–2017: Megan Colligan (president of domestic marketing & distribution 2011–14)
- 2017–present: Marc Weinstock

=== Executive Vice President of Creative Advertising ===
- 2005–2008: Josh Greenstein

=== President, Home Media Distribution ===
- 2011–present: Hal Richardson

=== President of Worldwide Home Media Distribution ===
- 2011–2015: Dennis Maguire
- 2015–present: Bob Buchi
