= Don Gaston =

American businessman (1934–2021)

Donald F. Gaston (August 5, 1934 – June 11, 2021) was an American businessman who served as an Executive Vice President of Gulf and Western Industries and Chairman of the Boston Celtics.

== Early life ==
Gaston was born and raised in Nacogdoches, Texas. In 1954, he graduated from Stephen F. Austin State College with a degree in accounting.

On December 21, 1953, Gaston married Paula Boynton, daughter of Stephen F. Austin president Dr. Paul L. Boynton. They had three children together and resided in Houston until 1967, when they moved to Greenwich, Connecticut.

From 1953 to 1962, Gaston served as an assistant manager of Ernst & Ernst in Houston, Texas.

== Gulf and Western ==
In 1962, Gaston became treasurer and controller of Gulf and Western Industries, and in 1966 he was elected to the company's board of directors. In 1967, he was elected to the board of directors of Famous Players, a Canadian theater chain owned by Gulf and Western subsidiary Paramount Pictures. Later that year, he was elected Executive Vice President of Gulf and Western. He also served on the board of Gulf and Western subsidiaries Madison Square Garden, Roosevelt Raceway, Capitol Life Insurance Company, and the Providence Washington Insurance Company.

In 1979, the U.S. Securities and Exchange Commission accused Gaston and company Chairman Charles Bluhdorn of a number of securities violations. The case was settled in 1981 and Gaston and Bluhdorn were not required to pay any restitution.

== Richfield Holdings ==
In 1982, Gaston formed Richfield Holdings Ltd., an investment group that purchased Providence Capitol International Insurance Ltd. and Famous Players Realty Ltd. from Gulf and Western for $350 million. He resigned from Gulf and Western once the sale was completed.

== Boston Celtics ==
In 1983, Celtics owner Harry T. Mangurian, Jr. was on the verge of selling the team to Steve Belkin. However, when it was revealed that two of Belkin's business associates were convicted bookmakers, the negative publicity led Belkin to withdraw his bid. Twenty-four hours after the Belkin deal fell through, Gaston, who desired to purchase either the New York Knicks or the Boston Celtics, began negotiations to purchase the team. On August 9, 1983, Mangurian sold the team to Gaston, Paul R. Dupee Jr., and Alan N. Cohen for $15 million. During Gaston's tenure as owner, the Celtics won two championships (1984 and 1986). Gaston's ownership group also began offering public stock in the team on the New York Stock Exchange. The team also branched out into media ownership by purchasing WFXT-TV and WEEI in September 1989. In 1993, Gaston's son, Paul Gaston, took control of the team. It was sold to Boston Basketball Partners in 2002 for $360 million.

== Later life ==
Gaston and his wife resided in the same home in Greenwich, Connecticut until Paula's death on April 11, 2021. Don died exactly two months later.

Sporting positions
Preceded by Harry T. Mangurian Jr.	Boston Celtics owner 1983–1993; Served alongside: Alan N. Cohen and Paul Dupee	Succeeded by Paul Gaston
