= Alan N. Cohen =

American basketball player (1930–2004)

Alan Norman Cohen
- Born: December 19, 1930; Passaic, New Jersey
- Died: August 10, 2004 (aged 73); Boca Raton, Florida
- Education: B.A. Columbia College; J.D. Columbia Law School
- Occupation: businessman
- Known for: co-owner of the Boston Celtics co-owner of the New Jersey Nets owner of the New York Knicks owner of the New York Rangers.
- Spouse(s): Joan Fields (until her death); Carol Cohen
- Children: with Fields: --Laurie Cohen Fenster --Gordon Cohen with Carol Cohen: --Rebecca Cohen

Alan Norman Cohen (December 19, 1930 – August 10, 2004) was the former co-owner of the Boston Celtics and the New Jersey Nets, and chairman and CEO of the Madison Square Garden Corporation, owner of the New York Knicks and the New York Rangers.

== Biography ==
Born to a Jewish family, Cohen graduated from Columbia College in 1952 and Columbia Law School in 1954. While attending Columbia College, Cohen was initiated into the Delta chapter of Zeta Beta Tau fraternity. After school, he served in the U.S. Army and then went to work for Paul, Weiss, Rifkin, Wharton and Garrison in 1957 becoming a partner of the firm in 1964. In 1970 he accepted a position at Warner Communications (now WarnerMedia) as executive vice president where he was responsible for Atlantic Records, Elektra Records, and Warner Bros. Records. He joined with a group of investors including Warner CEO Steve Ross and purchased the New York Cosmos, which made international headlines by signing superstar Pelé.

In 1974 he became chairman and CEO of Madison Square Garden Corporation, a public corporation which owned the New York Knicks and the New York Rangers. In 1978, Cohen and a group of investors purchased the New Jersey Nets basketball team. In 1983, he sold his interest in the Nets, and together with his partners, Don Gaston and Paul Dupee, purchased the Boston Celtics. The Celtics won the NBA championship in 1984 and 1986, with superstar players Larry Bird, Kevin McHale, and Robert Parish. From 1985 to 1987, he served as chairman of the NBA Board of Governors helping to pioneer the concept of the salary cap.

While not known as an innovator, Cohen did come up with the idea of placing revolving advertisements courtside at NBA games. He was the founding Chairman of ANC Sports in Purchase, New York, a provider of rotational and LED signage at sports facilities; and served as co-chairman of Sportsco International which owns the SkyDome stadium in Toronto.

== Philanthropy ==
Cohen served as a trustee or director of various entities including the Independence House, a youth offender rehabilitation facility; the Alvin Ailey Dance Theatre; the International Center for Photography; Haifa University; American Friends of the Hebrew University; the Educational Alliance; Columbia College; Columbia Law School; and the Graduate School of Management of the New School. He also served as the director of the American Friends of Tel Aviv University. He received Columbia University's John Jay Award and was elected to Jewish Sports Hall of Fame. In 2001, Cohen was elected to the Board of Directors of the Jewish Federation of South Palm Beach County.

== Personal life ==
Cohen was married twice. He had two children, Laurie Cohen Fenster and Gordon Cohen, with his first wife Joan Fields Cohen, who died in 1989; and one child, Rebecca Cohen, with his second wife Carol Cohen. Cohen died in Boca Raton, Florida, of idiopathic pulmonary fibrosis. Services were held at the Park Avenue Synagogue in Manhattan.

Sporting positions
| Preceded by Harry T. Mangurian Jr. | Boston Celtics principal owner 1983–1993; Served alongside: Don Gaston and Paul Dupee | Succeeded by Paul Gaston |
| Preceded by Roy Boe | New Jersey Nets principal owner 1978–1998; Served alongside: Joe Taub | Succeeded by Raymond Chambers; Lewis Katz |
