= Taylor Forge =

Taylor Forge is a defunct engineering and manufacturing company founded by J. Hall Taylor in 1900 as the American Spiral Pipe Works. It was renamed Taylor Forge & Pipe Works in 1929 and acquired by Gulf and Western Industries in 1967, becoming part of its Gulf and Western Manufacturing Company division. In 1984, Gulf and Western divested itself of its Taylor Forge operations to private investors, forming Taylor Forge Stainless and Taylor Forge Engineered Systems which consisted primarily of the Paola, Kansas facility Taylor Forge acquired from Fluor Corporation in 1959.

By the early 1960s the company had general offices and works located in Cicero, Illinois (Chicago, Illinois area), and plants at Carnegie, Pennsylvania; Gary, Indiana; Houston, Texas; Somerville, New Jersey; and Hamilton, Ontario, Canada. Works and plants forged various industrial items from titanium, tungsten, magnesium, and nickel base superalloys for engineering applications. Their forged titanium products, such as discs and seamless rings for jet engines; hemispheres, elliptical closures and contoured seamless body sections were used in all U.S. intercontinental ballistic missiles of the time, such as Atlas, Minuteman, and Titan. Taylor Forge also developed and manufactured bulkhead rings for spacecraft such as Mercury and Gemini.

== See also ==
- Bonney Forge (Another former subsidiary of Gulf and Western Industries)
