= Grupo Compás =

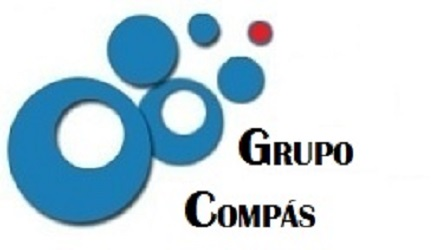
- Trade name: Alloy Valve Stockist
- Company type: Limited Company
- Industry: Petrochemical
- Founded: 1972
- Headquarters: Barcelona, Spain
- Area served: Worldwide
- Products: Valves
- Parent: alloy-valves.com
- Website: valvula.es

Grupo Compás, which trades as Alloy Valve Stockist, is an industrial alloy valve stockist and distributor based out of Barcelona, Spain and is recognized as one of the fastest growing service companies in Spain. Their customers come from three areas of activity: chemical and petrochemical refineries, combined cycle plants and companies related to the natural gas business, such as BASF, Repsol YPF, Saudi Aramco, Galp, Petrobras, Petronas and Marathon Oil; integrated engineering companies, like Sener, Technip and OneSteel; and valve manufacturers, stockists and specialized distributors, like Econosto and MRC Transmark. Grupo Compás supplies end users internationally, though the bulk of customers come from the US, Australia and European Union.

Grupo Compás is part of The M Corporation (Norway), a company that specializes in supplies to petrochemical and fine chemicals companies. The company started in 1972, initially as a supplier of mechanical parts, such as nuts and bolts, to workshops and hydraulic maintenance companies. It gradually extended its scope of supply to larger engineering firms and manufacturing plants in Spain. During the 1980s and 1990s, the company obtained representation agreements with several international pump and compressor companies. Given the complexity of these products, the manufacturers of each brand had to be approved by the end user sites, and this part of the business gradually became the company's main focus.

With the proliferation of products of Asian origin, which the market supplying to the petrochemical sector began noting heavily from 2000 onwards, Grupo Compás began withdrawing from the representation business, converting itself into a consultant to the end users to which it used to supply mechanical equipment. The strategy of advising plants on their procurements accelerated such that in 2003, Grupo Compás expanded its service from Spain to the rest of the European Union, then the rest of Europe in 2004, into North America in 2006 and to a worldwide scale in 2008, limiting its business to the valves business. In this business segment, Grupo Compás supplies valves internationally from its Barcelona warehouse.

== Processes in which high-alloy valves are used ==
Exotic alloy valves are designed to meet the complex combinations of corrosion, temperature and pressure in industrial processes.

=== Alkylation and Hydrofluoric Acid (HF Acid): monel valves in A494 M35-1, N04400 and Monel 400 ===
Alkylation in petroleum refining is a process through which olefins and parafins are combined to form high molecular weight isoparaffins. Alkylation uses hydrofluoric acid (hf acid), a highly corrosive substance that dissolves a wide range of materials, particularly the oxides. Monel valves are generally used in the most critical phases of alkylation due to their corrosion resistant properties.

=== Sulphuric acid: Alloy 20 valves in A182 CN7M, N08020 and Carpenter 20 ===
Sulphuric acid is a petrochemical derivative used in the manufacture of fertilizers; it is highly corrosive. Alloy 20 valves are used to handle the corrosion, particularly when the acid concentration levels reach 96-98%.

=== Desalination: duplex and super duplex valves in A182 F51, F55, S31802, S32760, A995 4A and 6A ===
Desalination plants refine sea water in order to produce potable water. Duplex and super duplex valves are corrosion resistant to sea water salinity are therefore often used in desalination plants.

=== Thermal interchange: titanium valves in A182 316Ti, B381 F2, B367 C2, R50400, B348 and 1.4571 ===
Heat exchange systems—often found at power stations—are used due to their mechanical resistance properties which in turn makes de tubular plenums resistant to vibrations. This in turn allows the tubes to be thinner and hence allow for [heat exchange]. As titanium produces a stainless cover on its surface, it makes it a heat and corrosion resistant medium. Titanium valves are therefore often used in heat critical parts thermal power stations.

=== Nuclear reactors: valves in Hastelloy B and C A494 CW6M y CW6, N06022, N10276, B3, C22 and C276 ===
Nickel alloys, such as the different grades of hastelloy are known for their heat resistance properties, as well as their moderate to elevated resistance to head. Hastelloy valves are often used in pressure vessels at nuclear power

=== Gas turbines: inconel and incoloy valves in A494 CY40 y CW6M, N06600, N06625, N08800, N08825 and B564 ===
Inconel and incoloy valves are used in gas turbine engines in those parts of the process that are subject to heat and require mechanical resistance to creep as well as corrosion and oxidation.

=== Vapor: copper valves in A182 F91, A217 C12, 904L, Uranus B6 and N08904 ===
Chromium and molybdenum alloys are extremely heat resistant and can tolerate the high pressure-temperature process combination that are typically found at combined cycle plants that use super heated vapor to produce electricity.

=== Chlorine: super austenitic valves in A182 F44, 254 SMO, 6Moly and A351 CK3MCu ===
Piping and valves that are exposed to concentrated chlorine require super austenitic alloys that remain inert to the medium. Valves made of 6moly, 254 SMO and A182 F44 are suitable for such process conditions.

=== Valve trims ===
Some petrochemical processes do not require valves to be completely made of a particular alloy, but allow that only the valve parts that are in contact with the medium (known as trim or wetted parts). Cost savings are a great catalyst for combining standard material valve bodies with alloy trim. For example, for a valve used at an inland desalination plant may it might be sufficient to use a duplex or super duplex trim, whilst the same valve used offshore might have to be made of duplex or super duplex body and trim. The American Petroleum Institute has standardized 18 trims, amongst others Trim 9 (monel), and trim 13 (Alloy 20). Other trims, however, can be made according to a manufacturer's own standards.

== Product gallery ==
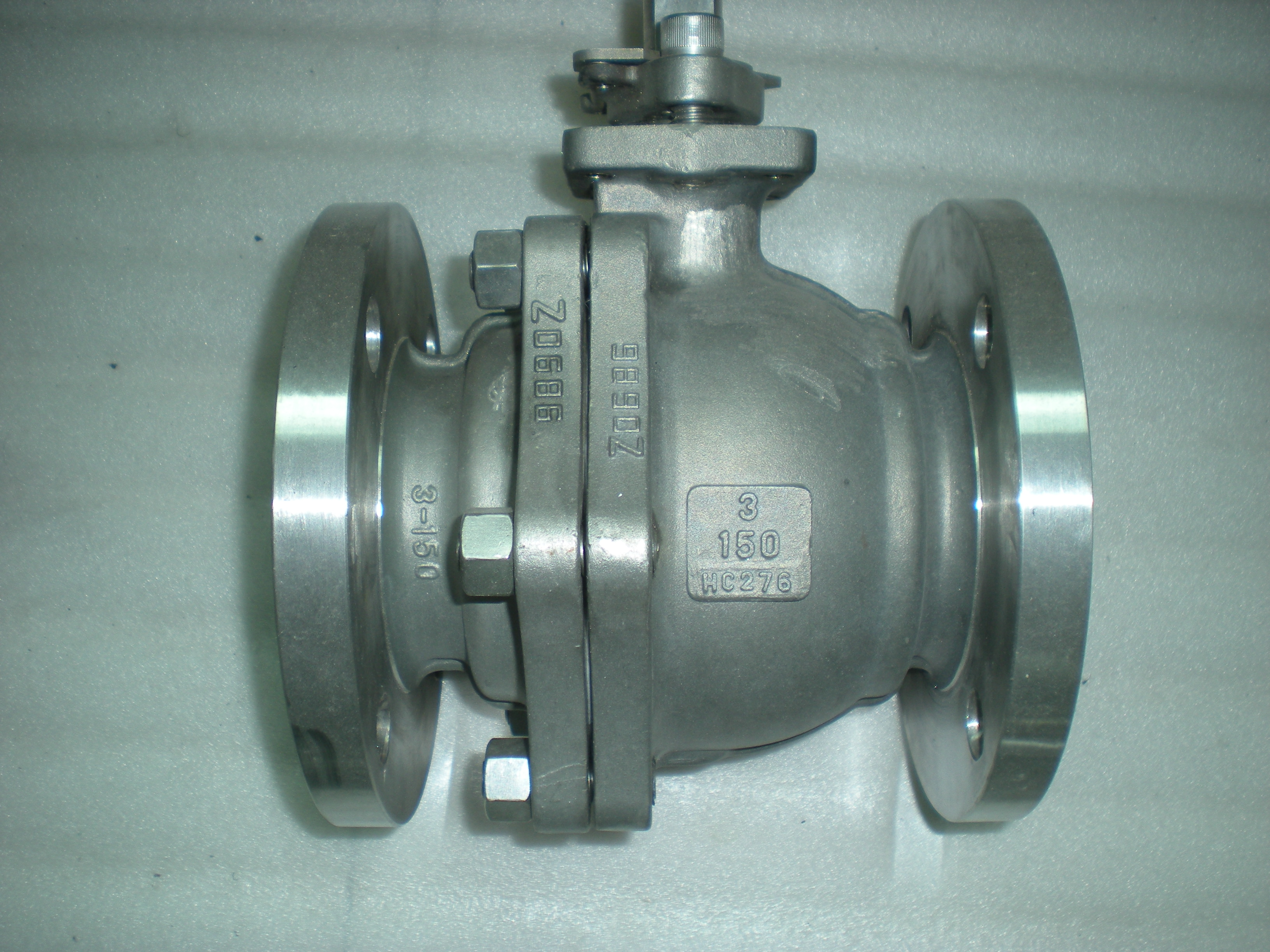
Hastelloy ball valve

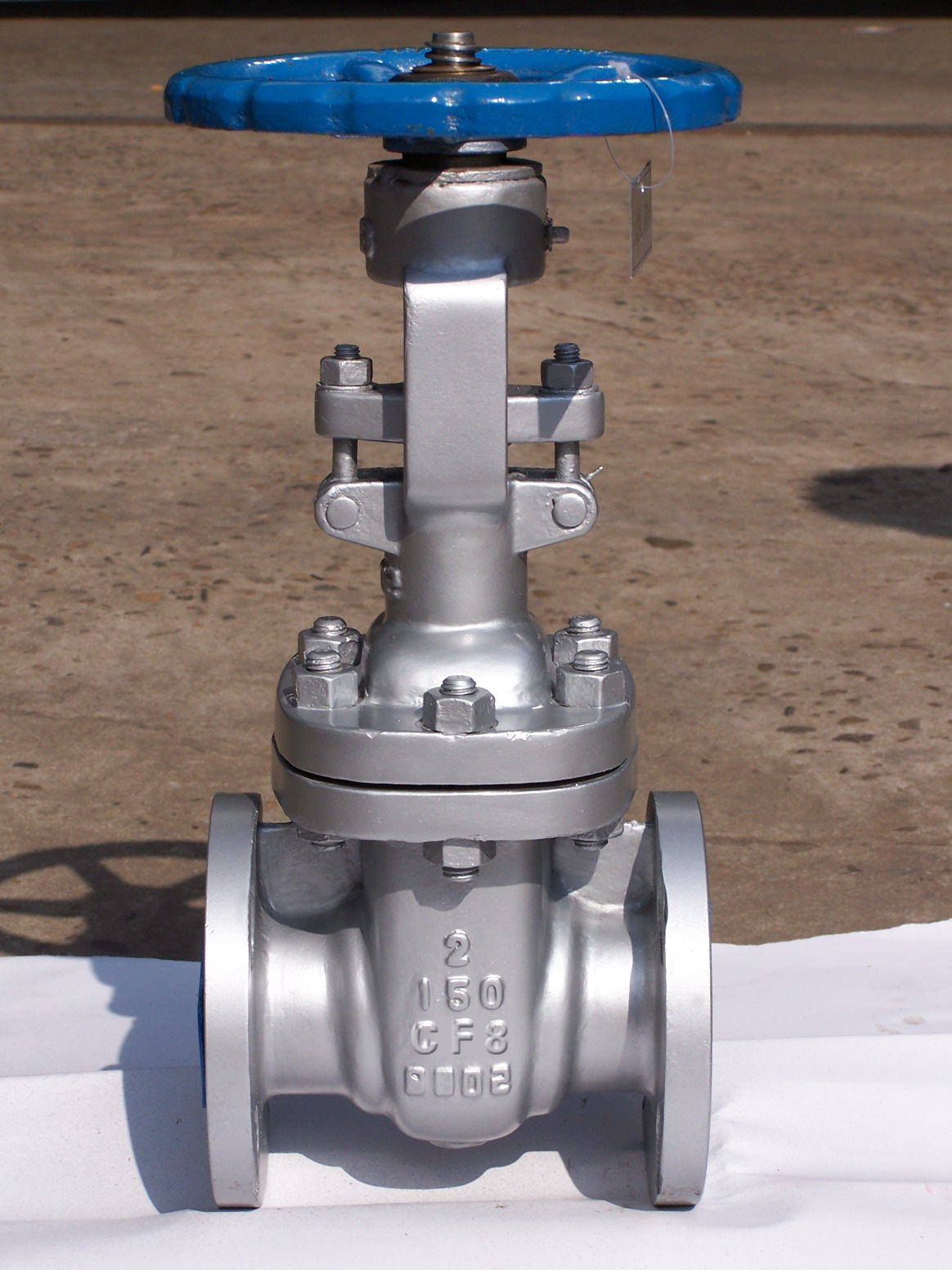
Stainless steel gate valve

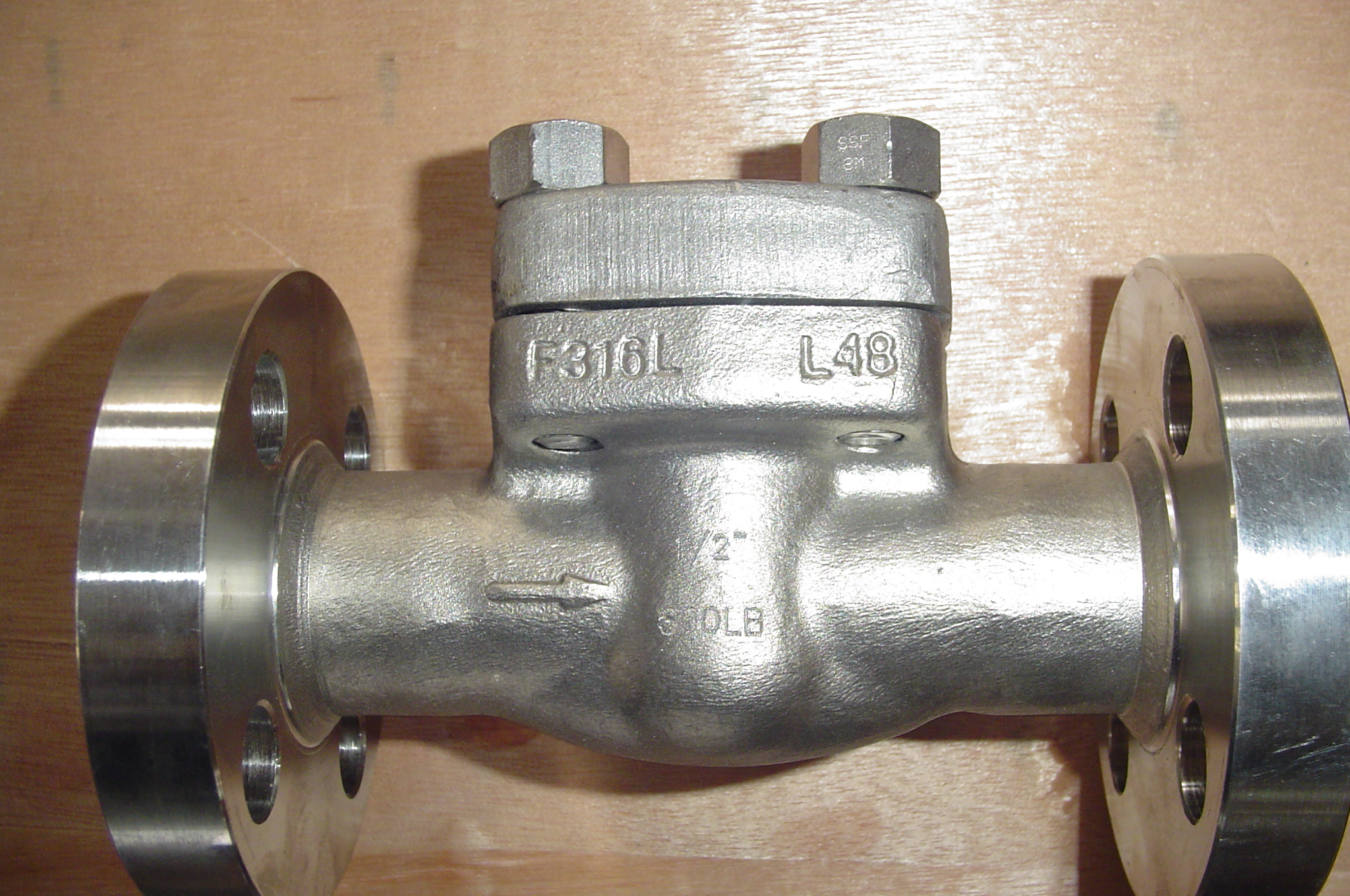
Stainless steel gate valve

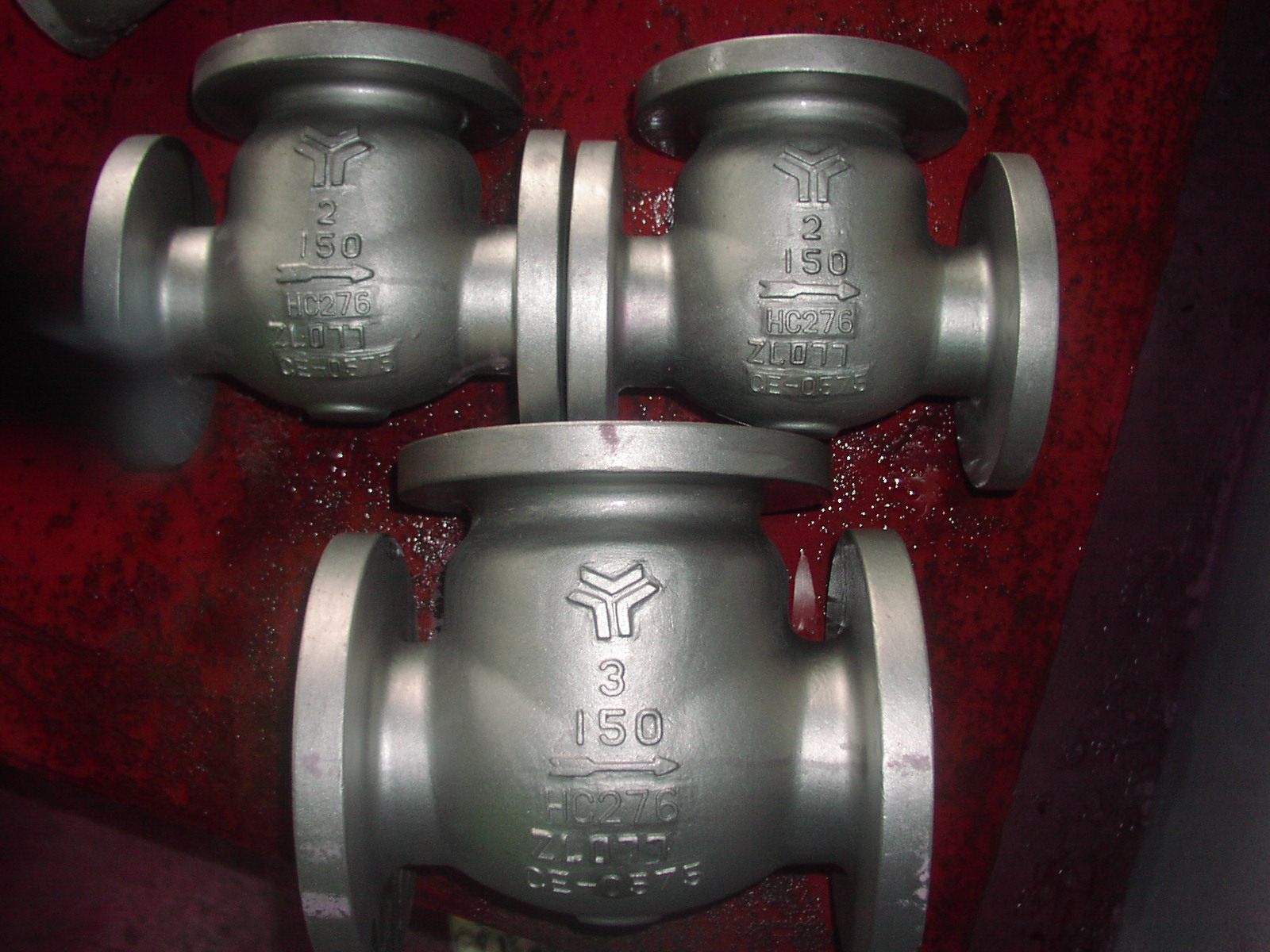
Hastelloy check valves

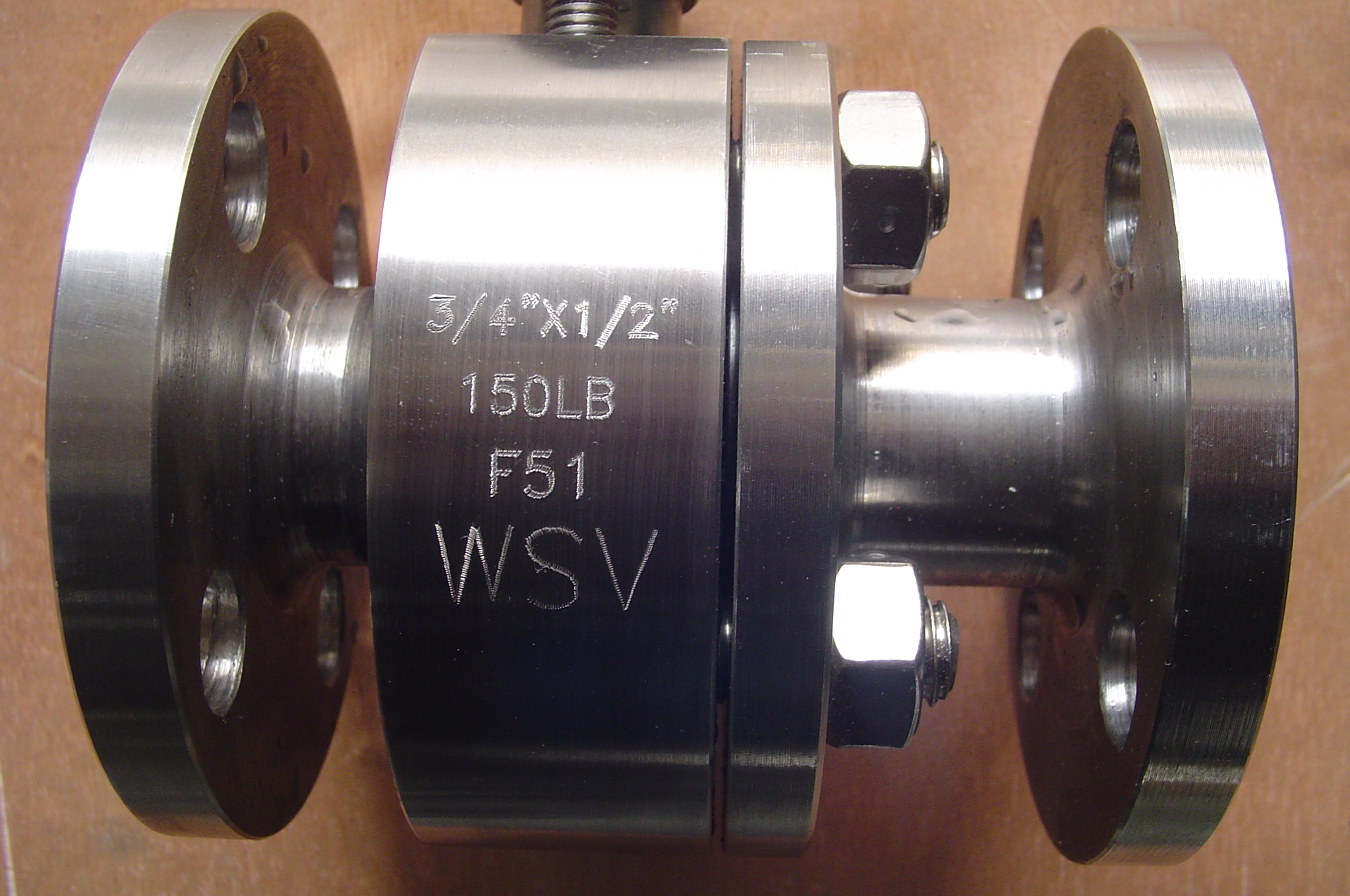
Duplex ball valve

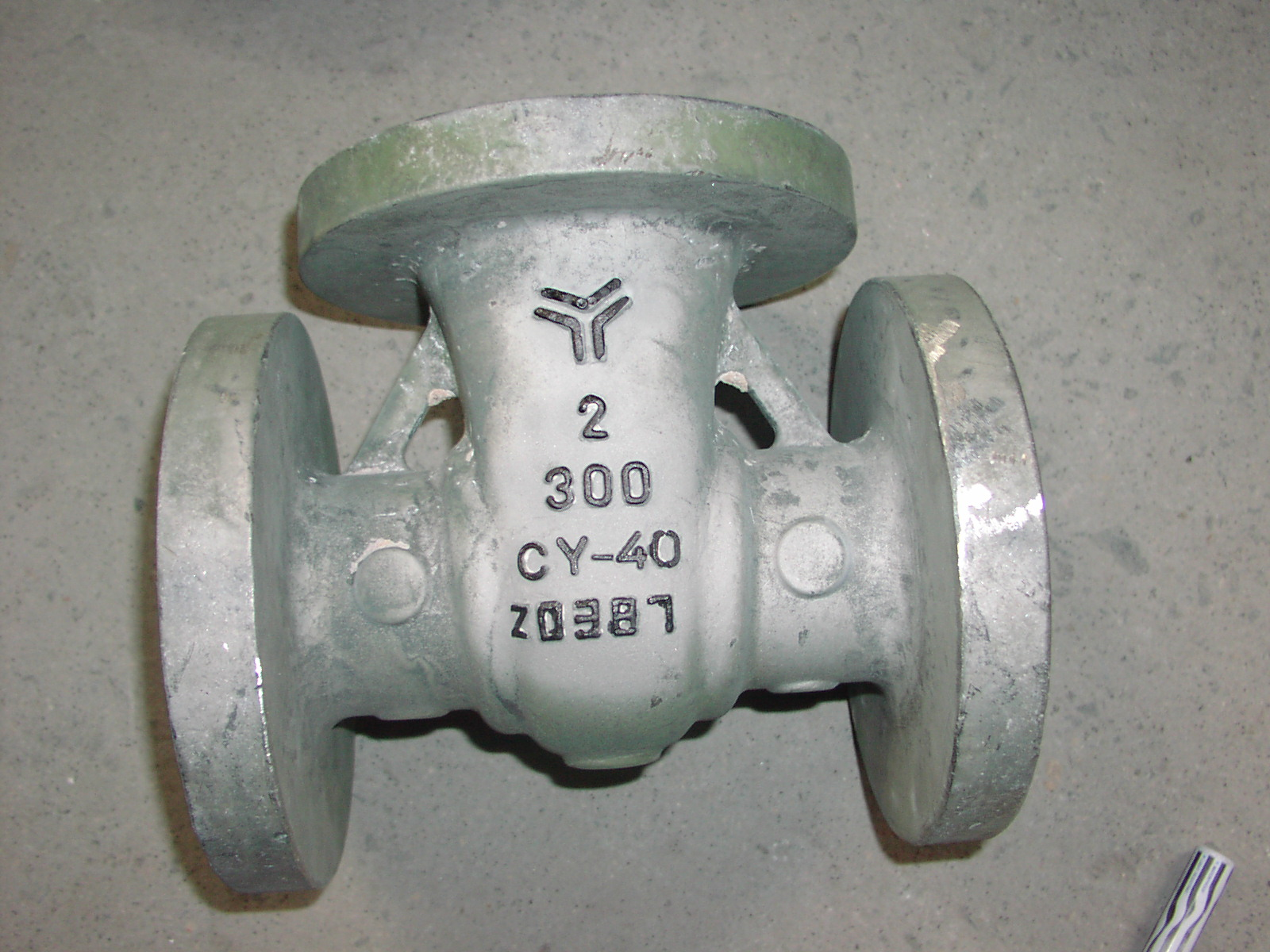
Inconel gate valve

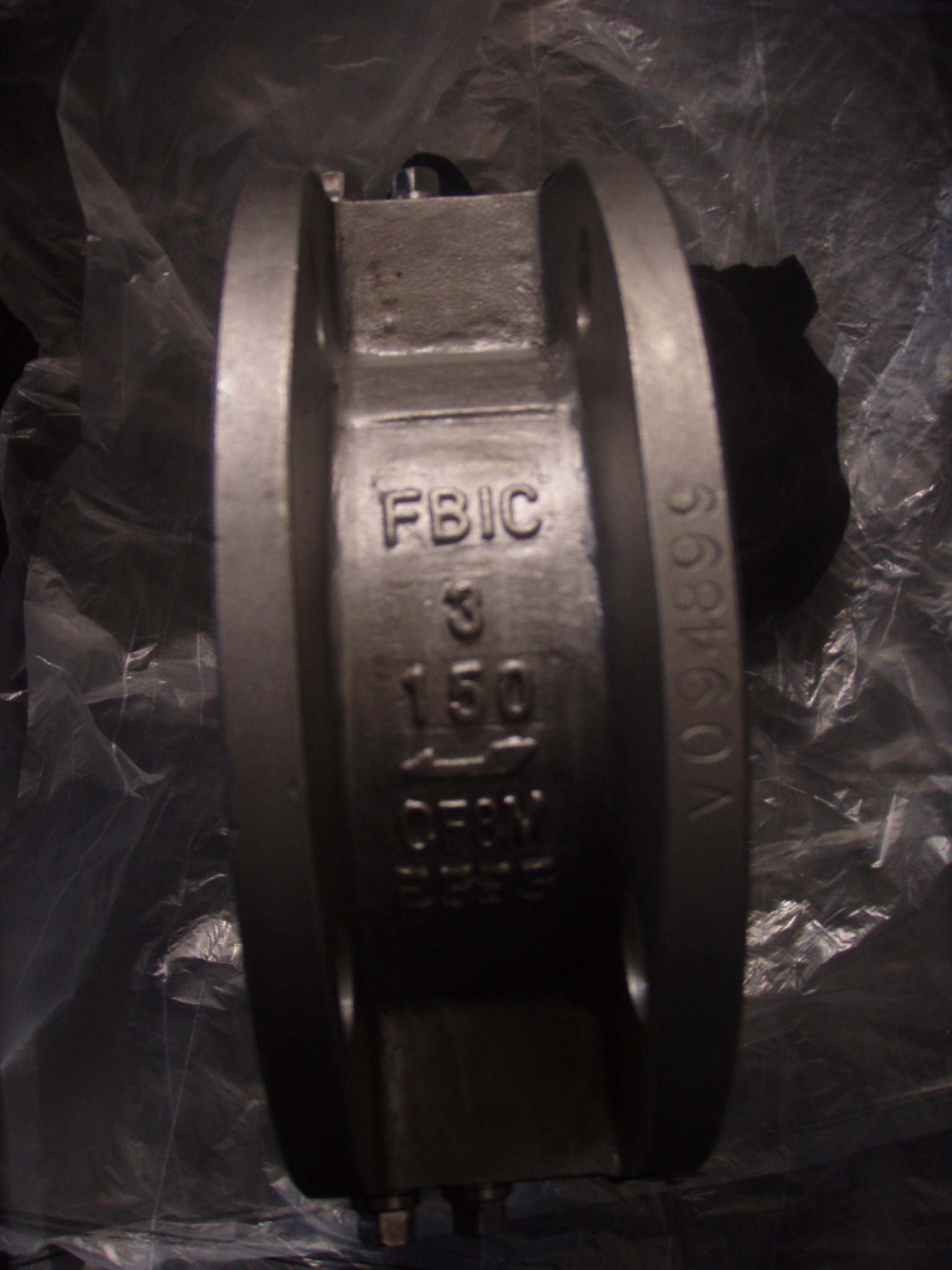
Stainless steel wafer check valve

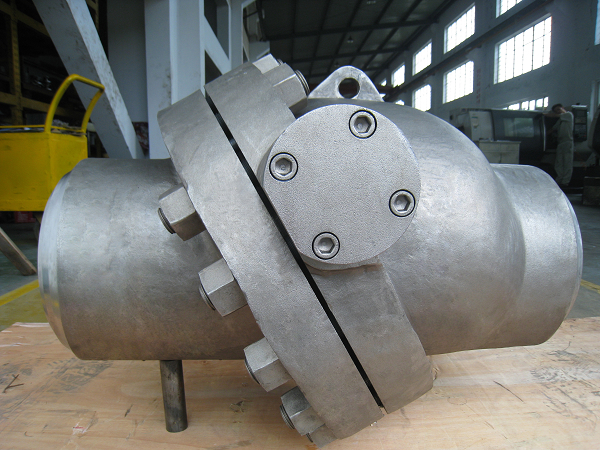
Inconel check valve

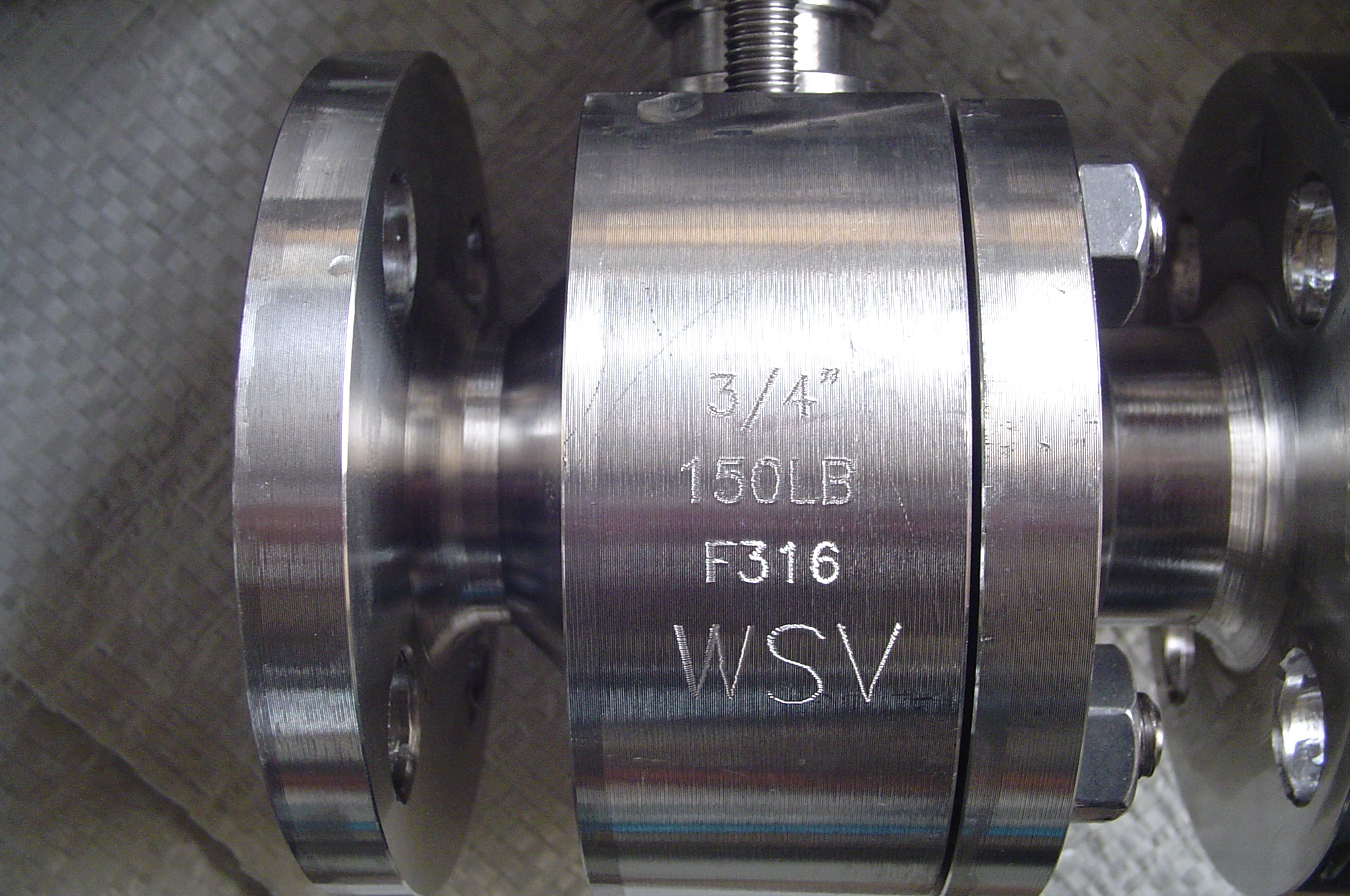
Stainless steel ball valve

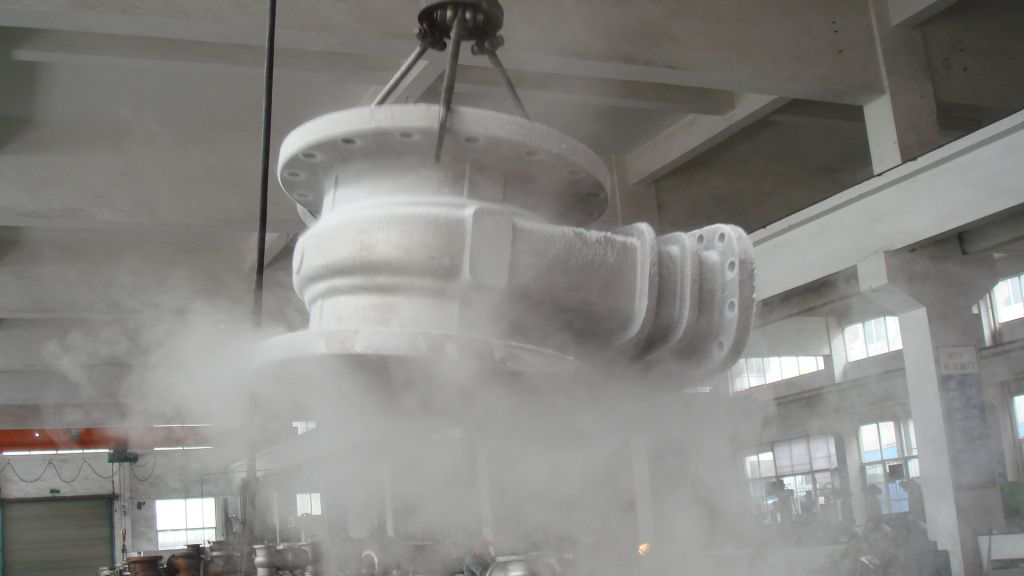
Cryogenic 254 SMO gate valve

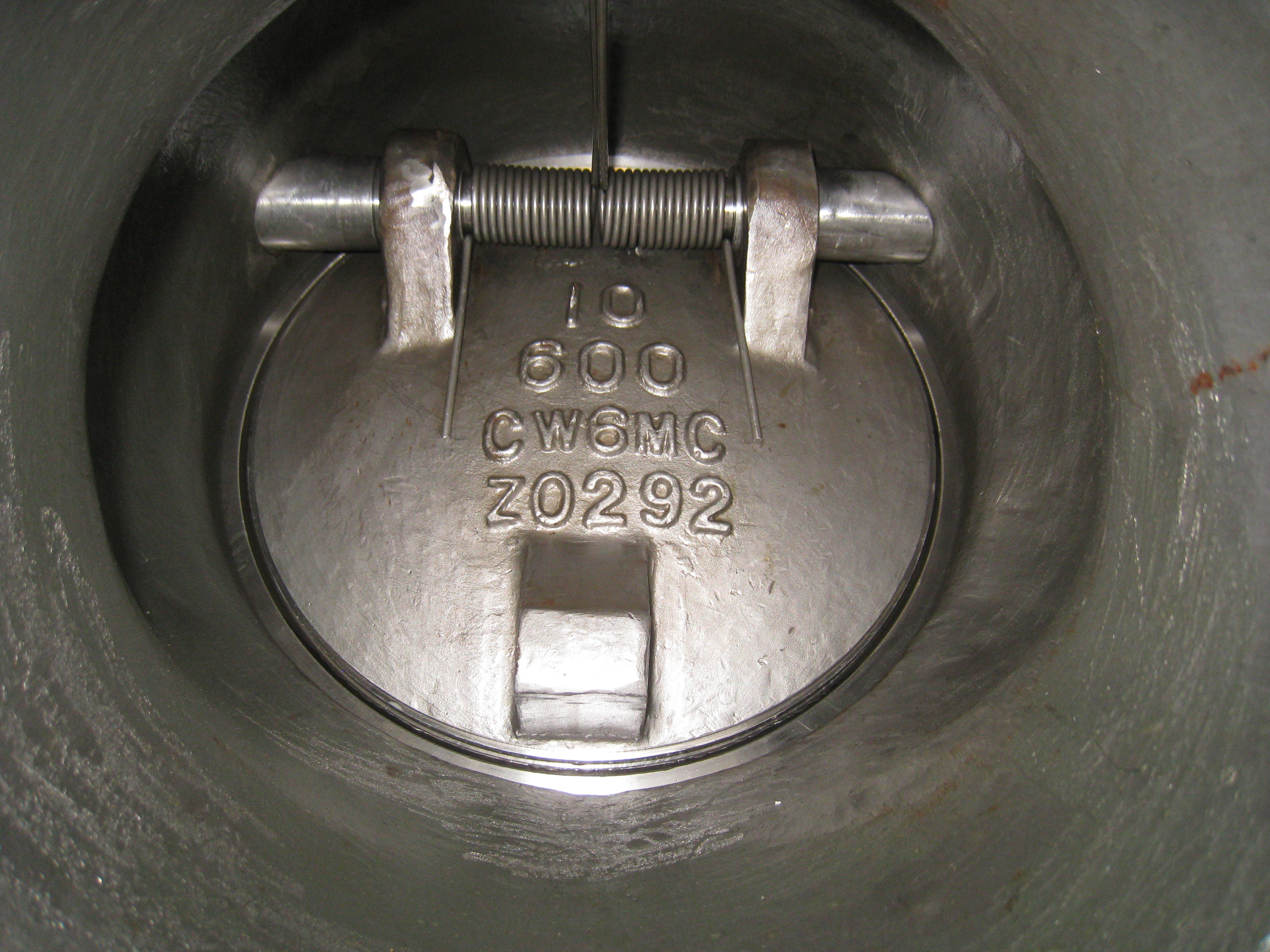
Inside view of a tilting disc inconel check valve

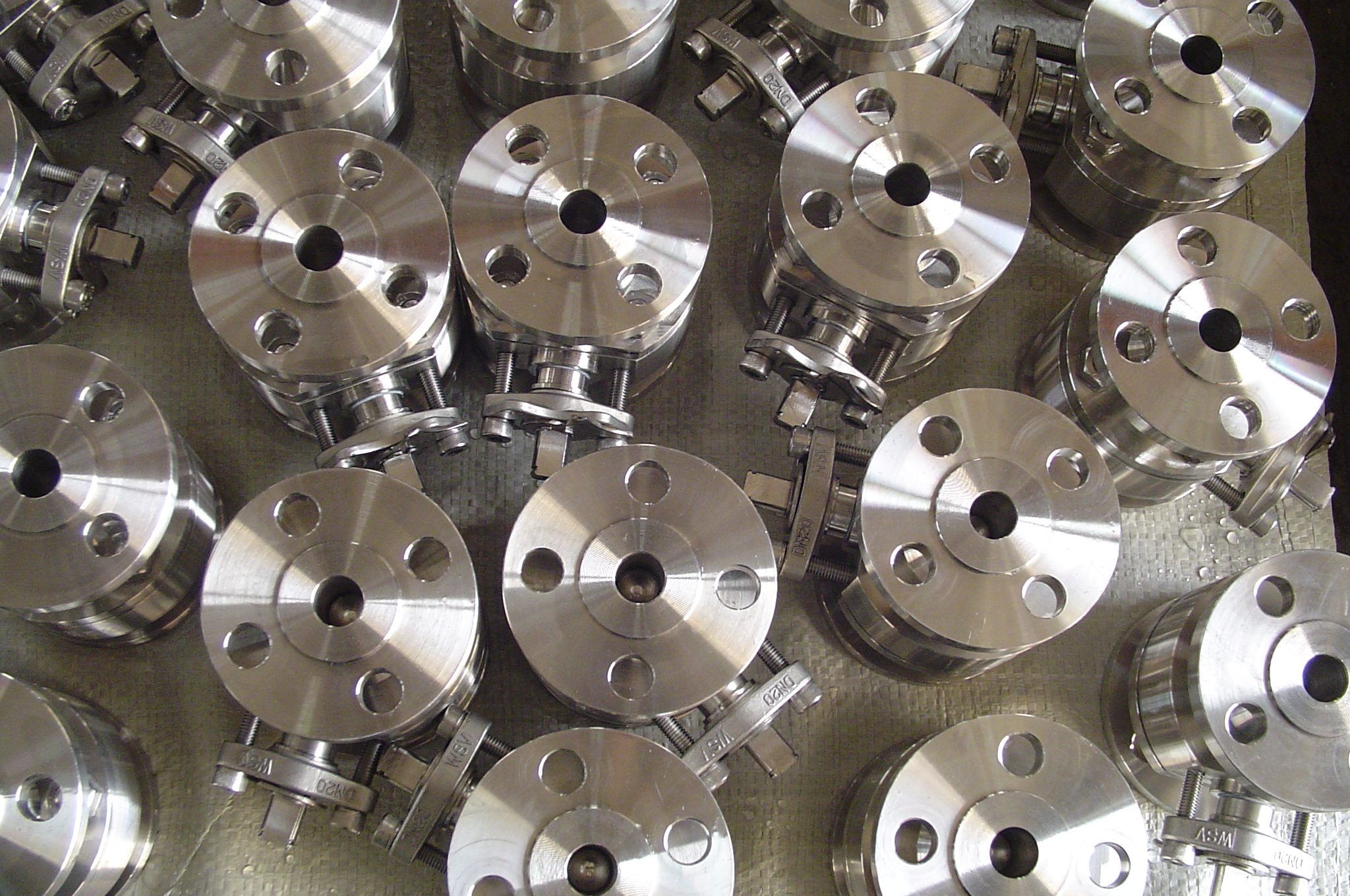
Duplex ball valves

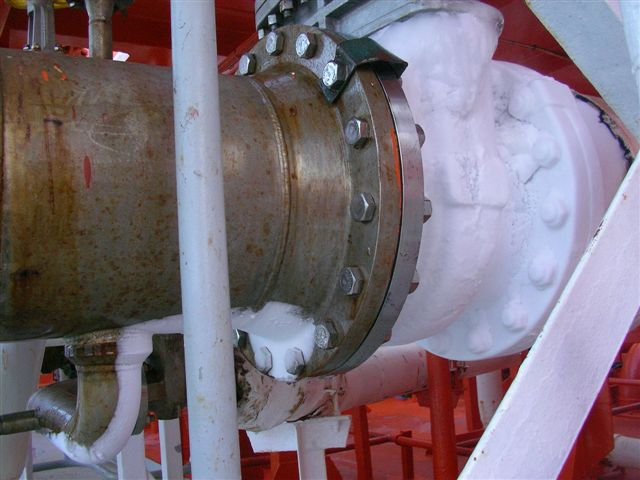
Cryogenic super duplex gate valve frozen up during operation

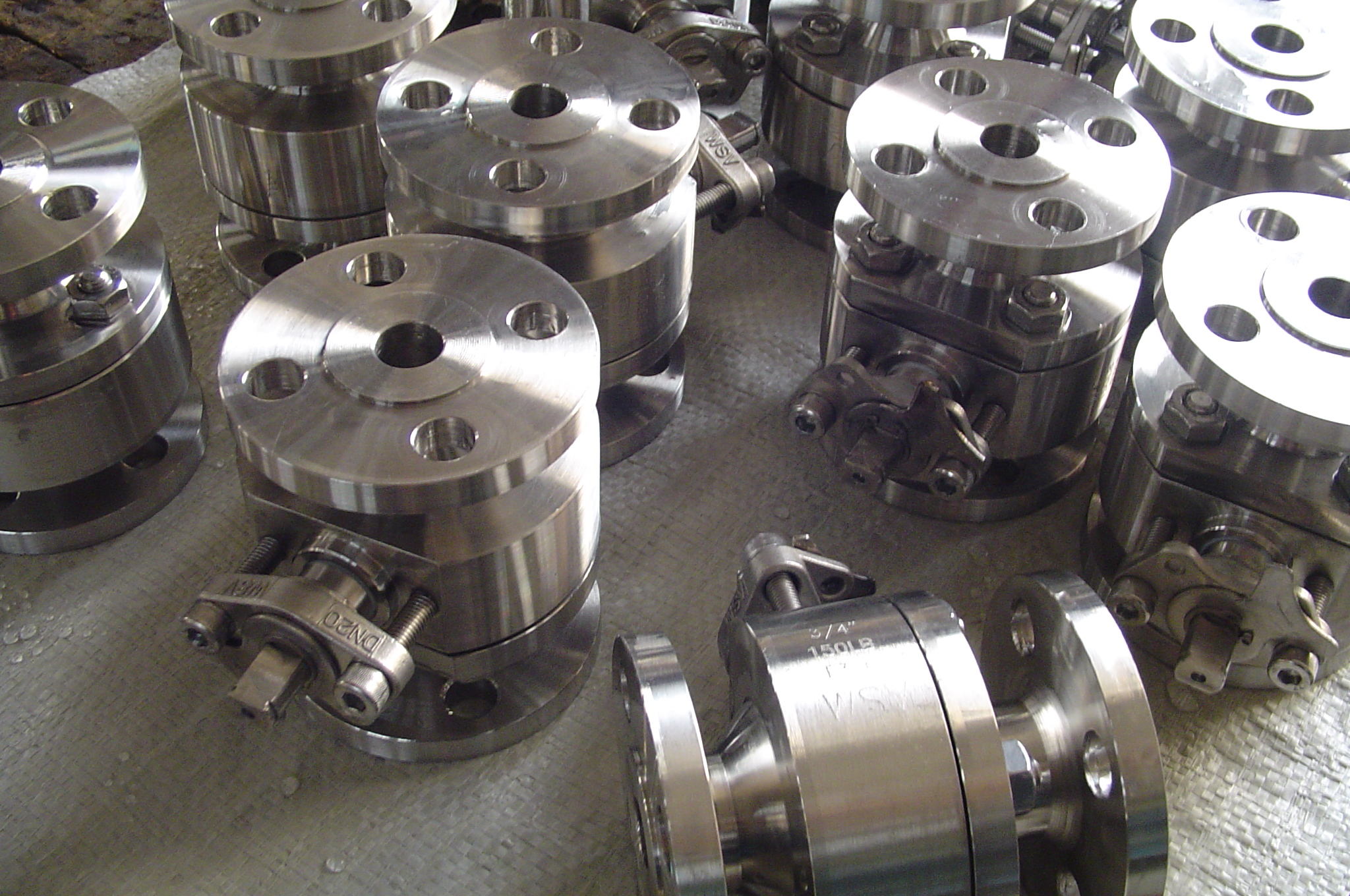
Super duplex ball valves

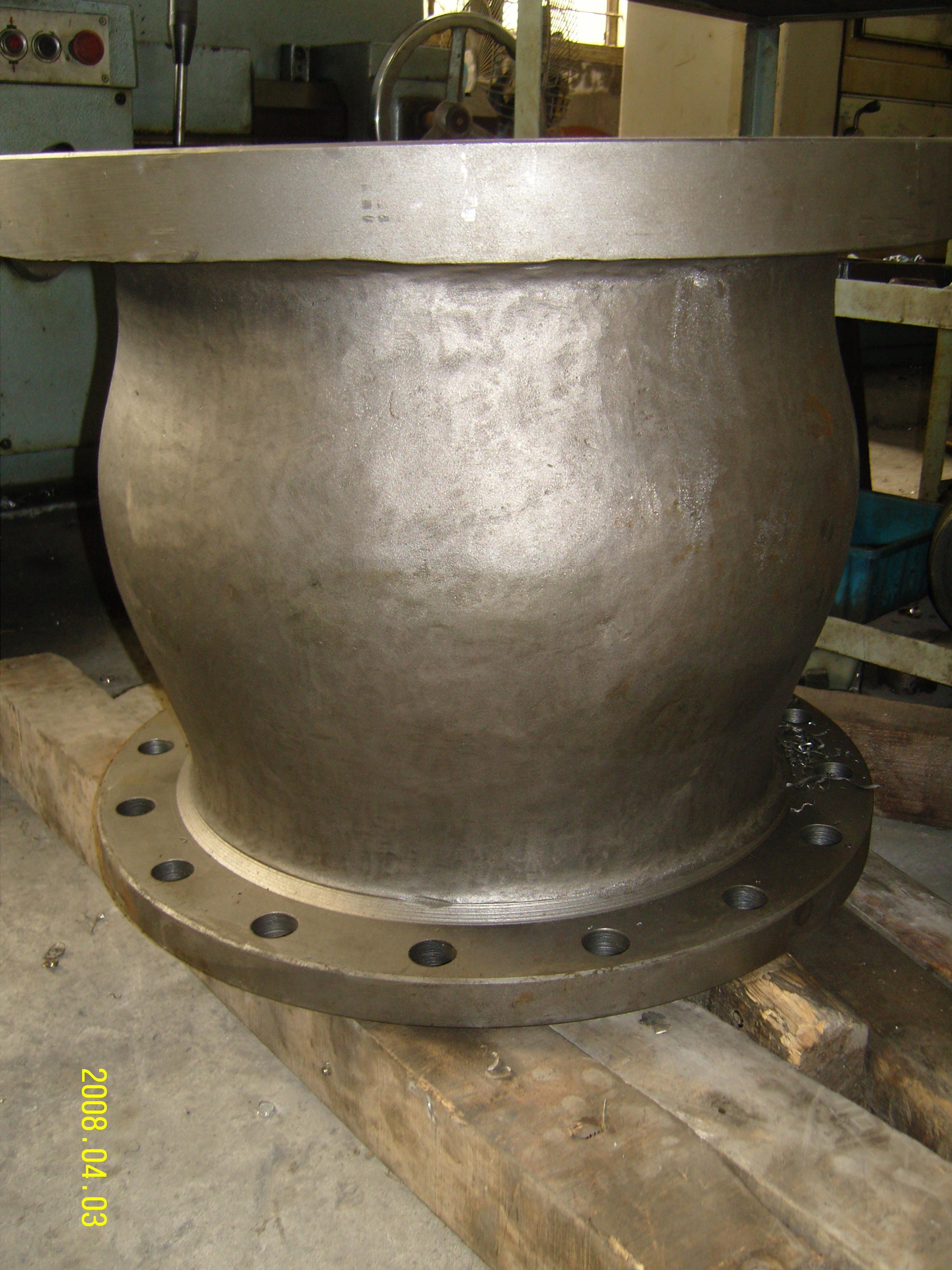
Flanged nozzle inconel check valve or axial check valve

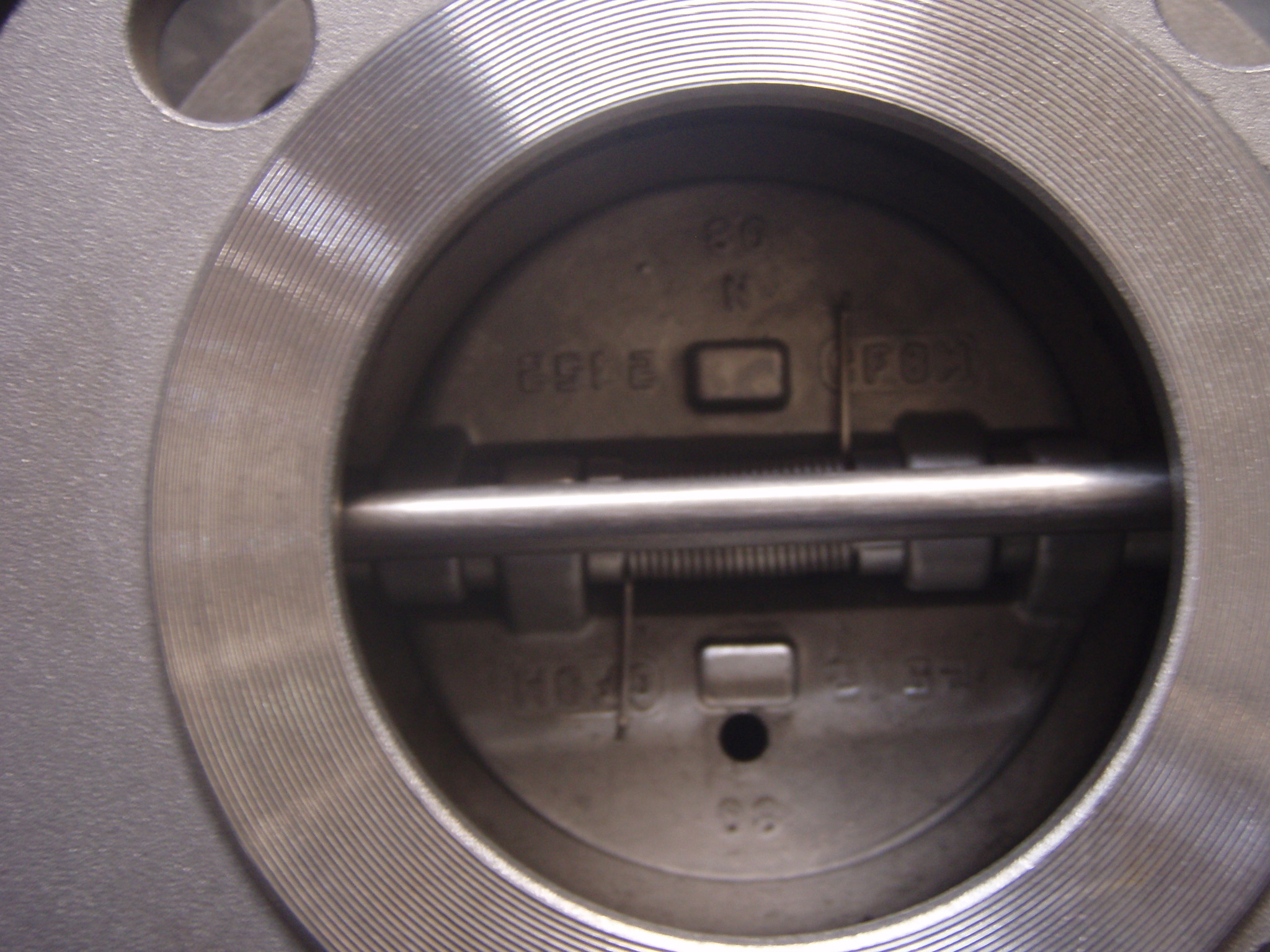
Inside hastelloy check valve, wafer configuration

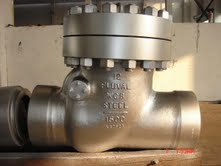
Large carbon steel swing check valve
