= CIC Video =

Former US home video distributor

- Type: Label
- Founded: 1980; 46 years ago
- Defunct: 1999; 27 years ago
- Fate: Fully acquired by Paramount Pictures and renamed Paramount Home Entertainment International; Universal titles now going through Universal Pictures Video
- Successor: Paramount Home Entertainment International; Universal Pictures Video
- Products: Home video
- Parent: Cinema International Corporation (1980–1981); United International Pictures (1981–1999)
- Divisions: CIC-Taft Video

CIC Video was a home video distributor, established in 1980, owned by Cinema International Corporation (the forerunner of United International Pictures), and operated in some countries (such as United Kingdom, Australia, Brazil, Japan, France, Germany, Hungary, Italy, Mexico, Netherlands, Belgium, Spain, Portugal, Norway, Sweden, Denmark, Poland, South Korea, Turkey, Argentina, Colombia, Philippines, Chile and Venezuela) by local operators. Outside of North America, it distributed films by Universal Pictures and Paramount Pictures, CIC's partners. DreamWorks films (through DreamWorks Home Entertainment) were added to the company output in 1998, as the fledgling studio that had a worldwide video distribution deal with Universal.

== History ==
When the distributor appointed Karl Oliver from Brooke Bond Batchelors to be its sales and marketing director in 1991, they wanted him to introduce "classic FMCG disciplines" to its marketing campaign. Oliver responded by reducing video cassette prices to and promote impulse purchasing as part of CIC Video's reformed distribution strategy. After the sudden death of CIC Video's president Roy Featherstone of an asthma attack on 17 July 1992 the distributor underwent restructuring with aid from senior Universal and Paramount employees. In 1994, Viacom purchased Paramount Pictures, enabling CIC Video to gain international distribution rights to shows from, amongst other networks, MTV and Nickelodeon, which came into effect in Australia in 1995 and the UK and other countries in early 1996.

In 1999, CIC Video was dissolved when Universal pulled out in favour of its then-newly purchased PolyGram Filmed Entertainment's home video unit (PolyGram Video) which was then promptly renamed Universal Pictures Video. Paramount, meanwhile, would bring CIC Video under full control and promptly renamed it Paramount Home Entertainment International. The last videos with the CIC label were released within the same year. Meanwhile, the distributor signed sales and distribution contracts with local market producers in Europe to increase profit and the brand name of CIC Video remained in the short term in markets where Paramount Home Entertainment were absent.

CIC Video was operated in Australia (where it was known as CIC-Taft Home Video) by the Taft-Hardie joint venture (now Southern Star Group), and also distributed some Southern Star and Hanna-Barbera product under other labels. The Hanna-Barbera library is now handled usually by Warner Home Video. The label's defunct subsidiary was a distributor called Rigby-CIC Video and CIC-Taft's label manufacturer was Roadshow Home Video.

In several countries, CIC Video was operated by other companies, such as in Sweden it was operated by Esselte Video, in Mexico it was operated by VideoVisa and in Chile it was operated by Video Chile.
