= Paramount Home Entertainment =

American home video distribution company

- Formerly: Paramount Home Video (1976–1999); Paramount Video (1982–1987); Paramount Home Entertainment (1999–2011); Paramount Home Media Distribution (2011–2019)
- Type: Division
- Industry: Home video
- Predecessors: CIC Video (1980–1999); DreamWorks Home Entertainment (pre-2011 titles only); Miramax Home Entertainment; Dimension Home Video (pre-2005 titles only)
- Founded: 1976; 50 years ago
- Headquarters: Hollywood, California, United States
- Area served: Worldwide
- Key people: David Decker (president, Content Sales)
- Products: Home video releases
- Services: Home video; Digital distribution
- Owner: Skydance
- Parent: Paramount Pictures

Paramount Home Entertainment (PHE, formerly known as Paramount Home Media Distribution (PHMD) from 2011 to 2019, Paramount Video from 1982 to 1987, Paramount Home Video (PHV) from 1976 to 1999, and operating as the namesake film studio Paramount Pictures from 2022 to 2025) is the home video distribution arm of Paramount Pictures. The division was founded in 1976.

The division oversees Skydance's home entertainment and transactional digital distribution activities worldwide. The division is responsible for the sales, marketing and distribution of home entertainment content on behalf of Paramount Pictures, Paramount Players, Nickelodeon Movies, Paramount Animation, Paramount Television Studios, Skydance Media, CBS, Paramount Media Networks (Showtime, MTV, Nickelodeon, Nick Jr., VH1, BET, and Comedy Central), Paramount+, and applicable licensing and servicing of certain pre-2011 DreamWorks Pictures titles, Miramax, pre-2005 Dimension Films titles, and as well as select IFC Films titles and Saban Films titles. PHE additionally manages global licensing of studio content and transactional distribution across worldwide digital distribution platforms including online, mobile and portable devices and emerging technologies.

== History ==
Before Paramount Home Entertainment was formed, Paramount released its video library through Fotomat. The relationship ended and Paramount soon formed its own video arm in 1979.

In 1989, the company had signed a distribution partnership with Prism Entertainment, the partnership continued until the end of 1990.

In 1999, Paramount Home Video was renamed to Paramount Home Entertainment.

In 2004, Paramount Home Entertainment distributed PBS Kids and PBS Home Video titles on DVD and VHS, after PBS ended its distribution deal with Warner Home Video.

In 2008, Paramount Home Entertainment launched a direct-to-video label, Paramount Famous Productions (with the "Famous" part of the name a throwback to the days when the company was called Famous Players).

In 2009, DreamWorks Home Entertainment was folded into Paramount Home Entertainment.

In 2011, Paramount Home Entertainment was renamed to Paramount Home Media Distribution.

From 2013 to 2017, Paramount titles were distributed by Warner Home Video, and participated in Warner-owned series like Warner Archive and 4 Film Favorites.

In 2019, Paramount Home Media Distribution reverted its name back to Paramount Home Entertainment, which is the name they carried from 1999 to 2011.

On February 13, 2025, Paramount Home Entertainment signed a deal to physically distribute its titles through Alliance Entertainment (no relation to the former Canadian company of the same name) in the United States and Canada starting later that year.

=== International ===
Outside North America, the Paramount Pictures film library was released on home media by CIC Video (which was a joint venture with Universal Pictures). In 1999, as a result of Universal pulling out of the venture in favor of its then-newly purchased PolyGram Filmed Entertainment's home video unit (PolyGram Video - which was then promptly renamed Universal Pictures Video), Paramount took full ownership of the venture and renamed it Paramount Home Entertainment International.

In February 2015, Paramount Home Media Distribution signed a distribution agreement with Universal Pictures Home Entertainment, whereby Universal distributed Paramount's titles overseas, particularly in the territories including the United Kingdom, where Paramount Home Media Distribution holds an office. The deal began on July 1, 2015. However, the deal expired in July 2020 when Paramount Home Entertainment signed a new UK home entertainment distribution deal with Elevation Sales (a joint venture between StudioCanal UK and Lionsgate UK), as well as signing other home entertainment distribution deals with Koch Media (later Plaion Pictures) for Italy, Divisa Home Video for Spain, ESC Distribution for France and Dutch FilmWorks for Benelux, all starting in January 2021 and Happinet for Japan, starting on July 1, 2025.

== HD DVD and Blu-ray support ==
Paramount brands the majority of its HD content under the label 'Paramount High Definition' which is seen both on the title box cover and as an in-movie opening. Films from Paramount subsidiaries such as Nickelodeon Movies and MTV Films as well as from former sister studio DreamWorks Pictures use no special branding, Paramount Vantage (another subsidiary) releases only select titles under the Paramount High Definition banner.

In October 2005, Paramount announced that it would be supporting the HD video format Blu-ray in addition to rival format HD DVD, becoming the first studio to release on both formats. Its first four HD DVD releases came in July 2006, and it released four titles on Blu-ray two months later. In August 2007, Paramount (along with DreamWorks Pictures and DreamWorks Animation) announced their exclusive support for HD DVD. However, when other studios eventually dropped HD DVD and players for the technology stopped being manufactured, Paramount switched to Blu-ray. In May 2008, it released three titles on Blu-ray and continues to release its high-definition discs in that format exclusively.

== Sub-labels ==
=== Paramount DVD ===
Paramount DVD is a sub-label of PHE exclusively found on DVD releases, generally noted by a logo animation with a DVD flying into the Paramount mountain and taking the shape of the outline created by the mountain, which was used from 2003 to 2019.

=== Paramount High Definition ===
Paramount High Definition is a sub-label of PHE focusing exclusively on HD-DVD and Blu-ray releases of Paramount's film and television library in high definition video formats.

=== Paramount Presents ===
Paramount Presents is a series that showcased important classic titles from the Paramount and DreamWorks back catalogues, remastered for Blu-ray and 4K Ultra HD Blu-ray, often with deluxe packaging and new bonus material. The label debuted in 2020.

=== Paramount Gateway Video ===
Paramount Gateway Video is a sub-label of Paramount Home Video, releasing titles in the mid-price range. The label was originally formed in 1982.

=== CBS Home Entertainment ===
CBS Home Entertainment is a sub-label to mainly distribute CBS's library (CBS Studios, CBS Media Ventures, and their predecessor companies) on home media from 2000 to 2005 and 2019 onwards.

=== Paramount Famous Productions (2007–2011) ===
Paramount Famous Productions was a sub-label of PHE, handling films released exclusively to home video formats without a theatrical release.

=== Peanuts Home Entertainment (1994–2007) ===
Peanuts Home Entertainment (originally Peanuts Home Video until 2000) was a sub-label used under license from United Feature Syndicate to distribute episodes of The Charlie Brown and Snoopy Show and Peanuts specials, including Snoopy! The Musical, It Was My Best Birthday Ever, Charlie Brown and the then-annually-repeated specials Be My Valentine, Charlie Brown, It's the Easter Beagle, Charlie Brown, It's the Great Pumpkin, Charlie Brown, A Charlie Brown Thanksgiving, A Charlie Brown Christmas and Happy New Year, Charlie Brown. It was active from 1994 to 2007, when distribution transferred to Warner Home Video.

=== DreamWorks Home Entertainment (2006–2009) ===
After Paramount's then-parent company Viacom purchased DreamWorks Pictures in 2006, DreamWorks Home Entertainment was made a label of PHE to distribute titles from the live-action DreamWorks catalogue. This lasted until summer of 2009, after DreamWorks spun itself off from Paramount and became an independent company. The main Paramount label began to be used on post-2009 home video releases of DreamWorks titles under DW Studios, LLC, a holding company formed by Paramount to manage DreamWorks' live-action titles up to that point.

=== DreamWorks Animation Home Entertainment (2006–2014) ===
When Paramount Pictures purchased the live-action DreamWorks studio and signed a separate distribution deal with DreamWorks Animation, DreamWorks Animation Home Entertainment was subsequently formed as a label of Paramount Home Entertainment starting with the release of Over the Hedge on October 17, 2006. After DreamWorks Animation entered a five-year distribution deal with 20th Century Fox in 2012, the label was brought over to 20th Century Fox Home Entertainment. Paramount retained the rights to DreamWorks' pre-2013 catalog until they were sold to Fox and re-acquired by DreamWorks Animation on July 1, 2014.
