= Charles Bluhdorn =

American industrialist (1926–1983)

Charles George Bluhdorn
- Born: Karl Georg Blühdorn; September 20, 1926; Vienna, Austria
- Died: February 19, 1983 (aged 56)
- Occupation: Industrialist
- Known for: Gulf+Western
- Spouse: Yvette M. LeMarrec
- Children: 2
- Relatives: Hatuey de Camps (son-in-law)

Charles George Bluhdorn (born Karl Georg Blühdorn; September 20, 1926 – February 19, 1983) was an Austrian-born American industrialist. He built his fortune in auto parts and commodities such as zinc, and following a 1966 acquisition became CEO, chairman and president of the Hollywood movie studio Paramount Pictures. Paramount was a former subsidiary of Gulf and Western Industries, which Bluhdorn purchased in 1956 when it was called the Michigan Plating and Stamping Company.

By 1966, Bluhdorn had grown Gulf and Western to revenues estimated at $182 million (equivalent to $1.881b in 2024); that year it ranked 346th in the Fortune 500 list. The company grew through acquisition, including the takeovers of Stax Records in 1968, Sega in 1969, and Simon & Schuster in 1975. Bluhdorn became known in Hollywood for his intense yet gregarious character. He appointed the reserved Frank Yablans as president of Paramount and the outspoken Robert Evans as head of production, an uneasy and ill-matched team that eventually oversaw the release of hit films The Godfather (1972), The Godfather Part II (1974), and Chinatown (1974).

He died suddenly in 1983 aged 56.

== Early life ==
Details of his upbringing are vague; according to Vanity Fair: "truth be told, Charlie wasn't elucidative about a lot of things, including whether he was Jewish, which he kept Hollywood guessing about by posting a sentry outside the men's room door."

He was born in Vienna, Austria, to an Austrian Jewish mother Rosa Fuchs and father Paul Blühdorn. Per Who's Who in Ridgefield (CT), he was considered such a "hellion" that his father sent the 11-year-old to an English boarding school for disciplining. At 16, he moved to New York, studying at City College of New York and Columbia University. In 1946, Bluhdorn went to work at the Cotton Exchange, earning $15 a week. Other accounts say that he emigrated to the United States in 1942 and served in the U.S. Army Air Forces.

== Career ==
=== Gulf+Western ===
In 1956, Bluhdorn together with David "Jim" Judelson acquired Michigan Plating and Stamping, a small auto parts company that eventually grew into Gulf and Western Industries, a conglomerate that ranked 61st in the Fortune 500 by 1981. According to Robert Evans, in 1970 Bluhdorn had told him: "Imagine, twelve years ago I was walking the streets selling typewriters door to door." Apart from Gulf and Western, Bluhdorn was a director and major shareholder of Bohack, Pueblo Supermarkets, and Ward Foods.

Holdings of Gulf and Western were blue-chip names such as Paramount Pictures, Simon & Schuster, and Madison Square Garden, as well as less glamorous assets such as the South Puerto Rico Sugar Company, New Jersey Zinc, and Taylor Forge. Paramount was suggested to Bluhdorn by Sumner Redstone and the acquisition was encouraged by Paramount's head of publicity, Martin S. Davis. It was during Gulf and Western's ownership of Paramount that it went from being number nine at the box office based upon total receipt sales, to number one. After the marketing success of Love Story in 1970, Bluhdorn appointed Frank Yablans as president of the studio and Robert Evans as head of production. Together they oversaw the studio in its heyday, releasing such hits as The Godfather, The Godfather Part II, and Chinatown. In 1974, Bluhdorn stepped down as chairman of Paramount and hired Barry Diller as Paramount's chairman and CEO. According to Diller, Bluhdorn and Yablans had a very tense relationship with Yablans and Evans, and Redstone actually sought greater influence over Yablans, who he regularly bribed.

=== Dominican Republic ===
Bluhdorn was very aware of the financial potential of the Dominican Republic and invested a significant amount of resources into its social and economic development. He is credited as being the father of the Dominican tourism industry.

In 1967, Gulf and Western paid $54 million for the South Puerto Rico Sugar Company. Most of the company's operations were in the Dominican Republic, where it owned the extensive Central Romana sugar mill in La Romana and 300,000 acres (1,200 km^{2}) of land. Nearly half of the land was used to produce sugar cane and, at the peak of the cane-cutting season, the company employed 19,000 people, making it the country's largest private employer as well as the largest taxpayer and landowner. Gulf and Western acquired Consolidated Cigar Corporation in 1968 and later shifted its Canary Island cigar-making operations to La Romana. It also created Corporación Financiera Asociada (Cofinasa), a Dominican finance company.

In 1969, the Dominican government and Gulf and Western Americas Corporation established an industrial free zone in La Romana. The zone was administered by Gulf and Western America's Operadora Zona Franca de La Romana subsidiary.

As Gulf and Western had purchased Paramount in 1966, Bluhdorn had plans to turn the island into a moviemaking mecca. To sell the idea he constantly invited producers, directors, writers and movie stars, to get them to appreciate the natural beauty of the country.

During the 1970s, Gulf and Western developed 7,000 acres (28 km^{2}) of the sugar mill's land into the Casa de Campo resort. Casa de Campo is home to three internationally renowned golf courses designed by Pete Dye – Teeth of the Dog, Dye Fore, and Links. One of Bluhdorn's Dominican friends, Oscar de la Renta, was hired to do interior design for Casa de Campo. De la Renta also licensed his men's wear line through Kayser-Roth, a Gulf and Western subsidiary.

After a meeting between Bluhdorn and Warner Communications CEO Steve Ross in 1976, the New York Cosmos played against Haiti’s Violette AC in Santo Domingo. The soccer game was sponsored by the Central Romana division of Gulf and Western Americas.

In the early 1980s, construction of the Altos de Chavón village was completed. The project (which was financed by Gulf and Western) began in 1976, when a stone mountain had to be blasted for the construction of a nearby road. Bluhdorn had the idea of using the stones to re-create a sixteenth-century style Mediterranean village, similar to some of the architecture found in the historic center of Santo Domingo. The village was designed by former Paramount Pictures set designer Roberto Copa. Bluhdorn's daughter, Dominique Bluhdorn, is the current president of the Altos de Chavón Cultural Center Foundation.

== Personal life ==
Bluhdorn married Yvette M. LeMarrec, formerly of Paris, in the 1950s. He was a tireless executive who was once dubbed "The Mad Austrian of Wall Street." He maintained his position as chairman of Gulf and Western Industries until his death. Although he lived in the United States from the age of 16 onward, he was infamous (and widely imitated) for his cement-thick Austro-German accent, which has been lampooned in interviews by former collaborators such as Francis Ford Coppola and Robert Evans.

Bluhdorn was a friend of former president of the Dominican Republic Joaquín Balaguer and former leader of Cuba Fidel Castro. Bluhdorn met Castro at a meeting in Havana, which lasted for around seven hours. According to Michael Eisner in his autobiography, Work in Progress, during his first pilgrimage to the Dominican Republic, Bluhdorn proposed an idea he had for a picture: a Bad News Bears sequel set in Cuba, in which Castro hits the winning home run (he also proposed a film in which Sitting Bull meets Hitler).

== Death ==
On February 19, 1983, Bluhdorn died aged 56 of a heart attack on his corporate jet while returning home to New York City from his Casa de Campo resort in the Dominican Republic. His private funeral services were held at St. Mary's Church in Ridgefield, Connecticut. Among those who attended were friend and former Secretary of State Henry Kissinger.

== Legacy ==
In 1983, Donald Gaston established the Charles G. Bluhdorn Prize in Economics at Tufts University in Boston in memory of Bluhdorn. It is awarded annually to an undergraduate majoring in economics who has demonstrated outstanding scholastic ability.

The Charles G. & Yvette Bluhdorn Charitable Trust was a multi-million dollar charity overseen by their children. Between 2007 and 2013, the fund was spent down, and as of 2019 lists less than $3,000 in assets.

The 1990 film The Godfather Part III was dedicated to Bluhdorn, "who inspired it." His tumultuous relationship with Paramount executive Robert Evans was documented in Evans's 1994 biographical book The Kid Stays in the Picture and in the 2002 film of the same title, as well as the 2022 series The Offer, where Bluhdorn is portrayed by Burn Gorman.
