= Tourism in the Dominican Republic =

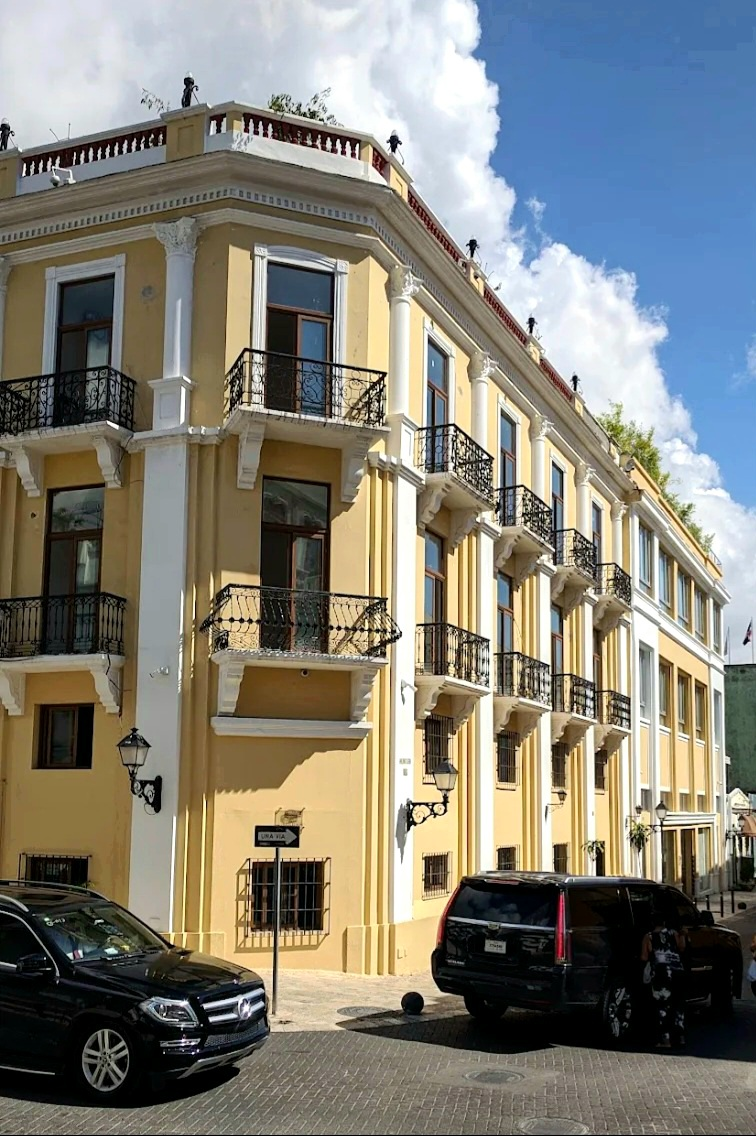
Santo Domingo, Dominican Republic colonial zone street view.

Tourism in the Dominican Republic is an important sector of the country's economy. More than 10 million tourists visited the Dominican Republic in 2023, making it the most popular tourist destination in the Caribbean and putting it in the top 5 overall in the Americas. The industry accounts for 11.6% of the nation's GDP and is a particularly important source of revenue in coastal areas of the country. The nation's tropical climate, white sand beaches, diverse mountainous landscape and colonial history attracts visitors from around the world. In 2022, the nation's tourism was named the best-performing nation since the height of the pandemic with over 5% visitors more in comparison to pre-pandemic levels in 2019.

As one of the most geographically diverse nations in the region, the Dominican Republic is home to Pico Duarte, the Caribbean's tallest mountain peak, and Lake Enriquillo, its largest lake and lowest elevation. The earliest cathedral, castle, monastery and fortress built in all of the Americas is located in Santo Domingo's Colonial Zone, an area declared as a UNESCO World Heritage Site.

== History of tourism in the Dominican Republic ==
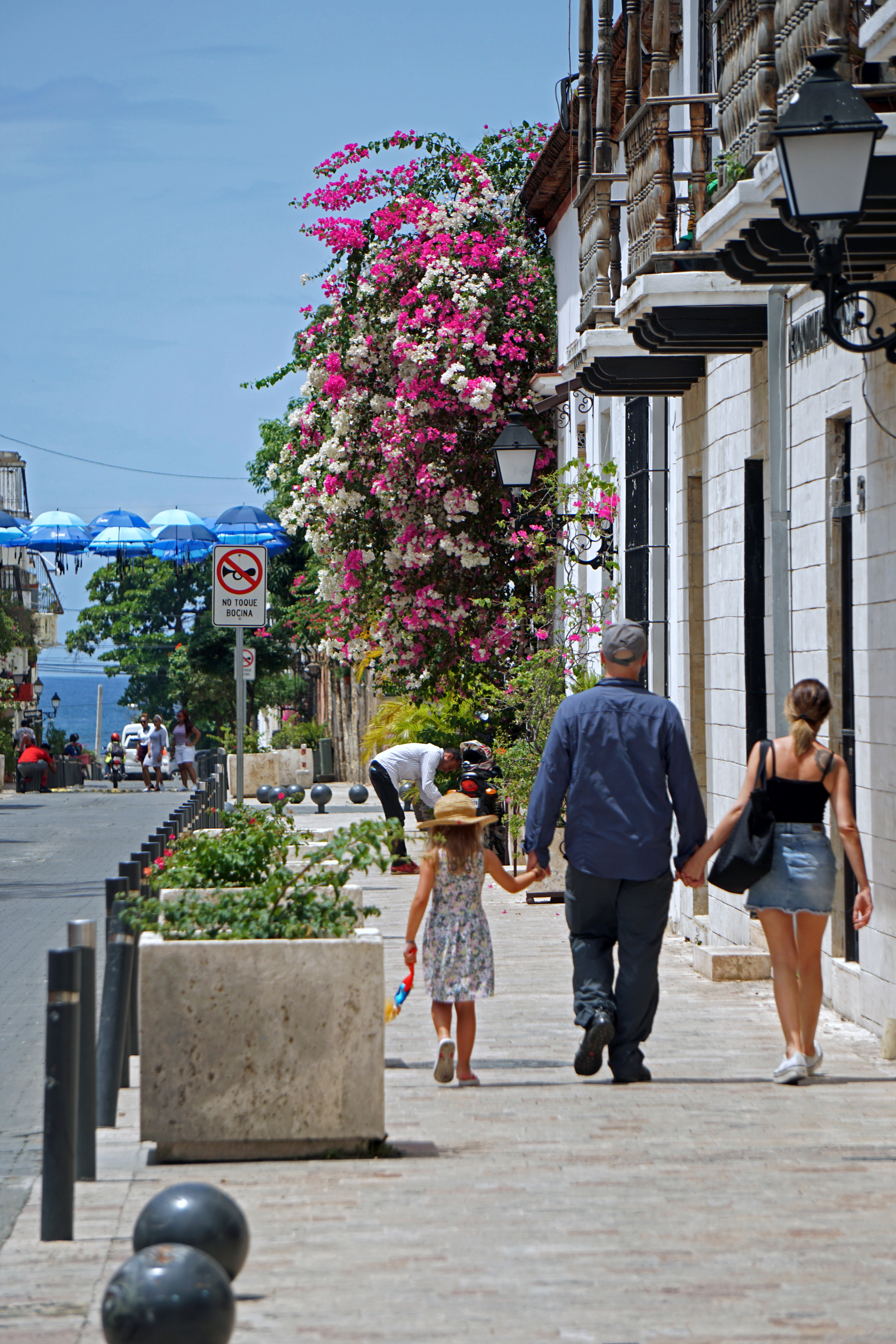
Colonial city of Santo Domingo

Due to political conflicts and warfare that had been present throughout most of the country's history, tourism was not common in the Dominican Republic until the 1930s. Rafael Leonidas Trujillo's rise to power represented a turning point for this facet of the economy. During the 1940s, the Trujillo government initiated the development of eight government-owned-and-operated resorts in the capital of Ciudad Trujillo (now Santo Domingo) to foster the growth of a tourism industry. The most famous of these developments was the Hotel Jaragua, which gathered international attention for its luxury, alongside the Malecón de Santo Domingo in 1942. Many of the hotels built during this time remain open and include: the Hotel Provincial, which is now a children's hospital; the Hotel la Paz, now known as the Hotel Hispaniola; and the Hotel Comercial in the Colonial Zone, which was the first privately owned hotel in the country.

Hotel development was not limited to the capital. Several provincial capitals were the site of Trujillo's public works projects. These included the Hotel Matún in Santiago de los Caballeros, the Hotel Guarocuya in Barahona, the Hotel Maguana in San Juan de la Maguana, and the Hotel Montaña in Jarabacoa. The building of the Hotel Macori in the San Pedro de Macorís Province was the first development in the eastern end of the country, which has now become the country's main tourist destination.

In 1955, the Fair of Peace and Fraternity of the Free World (Feria de la Paz y Confraternidad del Mundo Libre) was organized in Ciudad Trujillo, to honour the 25th year of Trujillo's rule. The event was intended to attract international visitors and showcase the development of the country's tourism industry, but attendance was below expectations and foreign investments failed to materialize.

In the 1950s, construction of the Las Américas International Airport took place, along with highway systems to connect it to the capital and better accommodate the country's growing number of tourists. The Cuban Revolution and resultant embargo served to redirect American tourists to Ciudad Trujillo as the Latin American tourism destination of choice. Conversely, political instability and social unrest in the wake of the assassination of the Mirabal Sisters in 1960, the assassination of Trujillo in 1961, and the Dominican Civil War of 1965 and subsequent US military occupation, led to a notable decrease in tourism.

In the post-civil war era, the tourism industry of the country saw an upswing through increased government attention and changes in economic policies. In 1971, the Tourist Incentive Law (Law 153) was passed to create the department for the Development of Tourism Infrastructure (INFRATUR). Its aims were to promote infrastructure projects, encourage private investment, and cooperate with the Ministry of Tourism to further grow the tourism industry. By encouraging private investment through low-interest loans, the Dominican Republic underwent two distinct periods of hotel and resort building that increased the number of hotel rooms from 1,134 in 1970 to over 20,000 by 1990. The country also saw the number of tourists increase from 278,000 in 1975 to over one million visitors by 1987, surpassing traditional Caribbean resort locations.

== Tourism in the present day ==
From the 1990s, the Dominican tourism industry has been developed and operated at its fullest, developing more housing complexes, through agreements and foreign advisors. Consequently, the number of hotel rooms in the decade of the 1980s was about 8,562 and the 1990s was 45,000.

In 1997, around 270,830 foreign tourists arrived by sea, of which 156,099 used the ports in Santo Domingo, 5,566 arrived via the port of Puerto Plata, 108,698 disembarked in La Romana, 404 in Samaná and 63 in Boca Chica. This figure compared with those of 1996, it shows that in 1997 the number of foreign visitors who used the waterway increased by over one hundred percent.

In 1996 entered to the country by sea 110.936, an amount that increased to 270,380 cruise passengers. Despite not having any financial incentive for ecotourism, this is in its true splendor. It posed above is confirmed by the annual statistics for visitation to ecotourism businesses and protected areas, which exceed 800,000 people. It quote the following data, for the year 1998: total visitors to ecotourism projects was 930,000.

Increasing competition, for example created by the Asian markets, and a change in the motivation of tourists, now forces authorities managing regions, and tour operators to supplement their offer with new options, not based directly on the sun, sand and sea. Additionally, some Asian markets, for example Thailand, have a very reasonable tax rate for tourist consumption (7%), whereas the Dominican Republic has an extremely high rate (18 to 28%). It has been argued that the Dominican Republic should focus on diversifying its tourism product, so as to prevent elimination from the market by competitors when tourists completely change their preferences by shifting, for example, from 3S to 3E and to focus on industrial and cultural tours such as the road tar mine at la quenera, approximately 10 km south of the Haitian boarder.

== Visitor statistics ==
Yearly tourist arrivals in millions

Most visitors arriving to Dominican Republic were from the following areas of residence or countries of nationality:

Note: Air arrivals only, it excludes arrivals by land and sea

| Country/Territory | 2026 (Jan–Sep) (*vs. Jan–Jun 2025) | 2025 | 2024 | 2023 | 2022 | 2021 | 2020 | 2019 | 2018 | Record high |
|---|---|---|---|---|---|---|---|---|---|---|
| United States | 2,198,700▲* | 2,707,522▼ | 2,763,432▲ | 2,578,292▲ | 2,004,849▲ | 1,655,324▲ | 612,433▼ | 2,030,257▼ | 2,237,519▲ | 2024 |
| Canada | 767,782▲* | 933,196▼ | 975,924▲ | 893,742▲ | 557,985▲ | 123,861▼ | 337,297▼ | 865,927▼ | 892,020▲ | 2024 |
| Germany | 88,990▲* | 121,053▼ | 129,839▼ | 134,958▼ | 171,409▲ | 98,100▲ | 37,048▼ | 180,567▼ | 217,185▼ | 1999: 453,175 |
| Argentina | 391,176▲* | 450,501▲ | 281,812▲ | 211,528▲ | 188,837▲ | 36,422▼ | 39,540▼ | 189,211▼ | 221,850▲ | 2025 |
| Colombia | 376,158▲* | 439,821▲ | 374,141▲ | 343,446▲ | 293,564▲ | 152,814▲ | 35,279▼ | 116,812▲ | 112,176▲ | 2025 |
| France | 128,949▲* | 149,826▼ | 157,903▼ | 161,385▼ | 217,508▲ | 106,490▲ | 77,834▼ | 219,750▼ | 228,629▲ | 2003: 317,620 |
| Spain | 110,204▲* | 128,882▲ | 128,142▼ | 181,164▼ | 181,588▲ | 117,652▲ | 44,998▼ | 170,138▲ | 163,273▼ | 2006: 273,517 |
| Russia | 16,814▲* | 22,949▼ | 24,120▼ | 24,424▼ | 113,650▼ | 183,700▲ | 75,847▼ | 217,082▼ | 224,064▼ | 2017: 245,346 |
| Puerto Rico | 198,029▲* | 248,322▲ | 240,405▲ | 226,279▲ | 163,709▲ | 107,150▲ | 36,721▼ | 117,039▲ | 105,695▼ | 2025 |
| United Kingdom | 153,960▲* | 188,413▲ | 182,757▲ | 172,621▼ | 188,063▲ | 21,213▼ | 31,525▼ | 158,085▼ | 187,492▲ | 2006: 243,823 |
| Venezuela | 42,322▲* | 50,420▼ | 71,261▼ | 99,524▼ | 106,602▼ | 125,936▲ | 34,286▼ | 111,576▲ | 101,155▼ | 2016: 170,713 |
| Mexico | 167,257▲* | 177,376▲ | 132,049▲ | 103,633▲ | 72,478▲ | 45,465▲ | 17,718▼ | 56,034▲ | 44,667▲ | 2025 |
| Brazil | 130,374▲* | 157,084▲ | 136,057▲ | 124,366▲ | 83,968▲ | 50,326▲ | 29,624▼ | 111,260▼ | 132,861▲ | 2025 |
| Italy | 84,382▲* | 107,033▲ | 100,020▲ | 92,214▲ | 87,553▲ | 35,835▲ | 28,614▼ | 92,674▲ | 82,581▼ | 2007: 146,808 |
| Chile | 119,726▲* | 145,238▲ | 143,935▲ | 126,737▲ | 117,077▲ | 34,024▲ | 25,653▼ | 114,080▼ | 114,613▲ | 2025 |
| World | 4,963,343▲* | 8,860,709▲ | 8,535,701▲ | 8,058,671▲ | 5,805,349▲ | 3,655,217▲ | 1,699,194▼ | 5,357,619▼ | 5,618,561▲ | 2025 |

== Weather in Punta Cana ==
The weather in Punta Cana averages between a high of 81 °F to 86 °F. The average rainy days per month is 11.25. Hours of sunshine can vary from 8 to 10 hours. The seawater temperature will vary from 79 °F to 84 °F. The weather is nice year-round which attracts vacationers even in wintery months.

| Month | High Temp | Low Temp | Rainfall | Days with Rain | Hrs. Sunshine | Temp Seawater |
|---|---|---|---|---|---|---|
| January | 81 °F | 72 °F | 22 inch | 10 days | 9 hours | 81 °F |
| February | 82 °F | 72 °F | 15.2 inch | 9 days | 9 hours | 79 °F |
| March | 82 °F | 73 °F | 19 inch | 8 days | 9 hours | 79 °F |
| April | 82 °F | 73 °F | 30 inch | 8 days | 10 hours | 81 °F |
| May | 84 °F | 75 °F | 70 inch | 11 days | 9 hours | 81 °F |
| June | 86 °F | 75 °F | 60 inch | 11 days | 9 hours | 82 °F |
| July | 86 °F | 77 °F | 60 inch | 13 days | 10 hours | 82 °F |
| August | 86 °F | 77 °F | 64 inch | 13 days | 10 hours | 84 °F |
| September | 86 °F | 77 °F | 67 inch | 14 days | 9 hours | 84 °F |
| October | 84 °F | 75 °F | 64 inch | 15 days | 10 hours | 84 °F |
| November | 84 °F | 77 °F | 44 inch | 12 days | 8 hours | 82 °F |
| December | 82 °F | 73 °F | 25 inch | 11 days | 8 hours | 81 °F |

== Tourism in the 2000s until 2009 ==
The country's tourism has become its primary source of income. The country offers a wide choice of accommodations in the city, in the mountains and in the coastal regions. The Dominican Republic is one of the top vacation places for Europe, South America, and the rest of North America. This is because the island's rich history and unique culture.

The main areas of tourist activity in the country are the regions of the East, North, Santo Domingo and Barahona, but nevertheless, there has been an increase in the interior, with many tours on foot or by bike through the mountains and fields. In 2001 the Dominican Republic was visited by over two million people and according to the Central Bank, the Dominican tourism industry has generated 2,103 million dollars, exceeding 1,782 million achieved in the previous year.

According to Central Bank figures, more than 2.5 million tourists arrived by air to the country in 2001, a 10.1% increase over the figure given in 2000. 58% of tourists came from European countries, mostly countries like Germany, France, UK, Italy, Spain, Switzerland, and USA, were recorded countries like the United States, Canada, Mexico, Venezuela, Brazil, Argentina and among others.

Tourism is one of the most important sectors of the Dominican economy, because this makes great contributions to it. The movements of tourists to other parts of the country involving expenditure, especially when is from a nation to another, that is the case of the country; Foreign tourists usually consume in dollars or exchange their currency for the Dominican peso, this generates an injection of dollars into the economy and thus the country can buy the services and products that do not produce. The country had revenues in 2004 of 2.557 million euros.

The Dominican Republic, thanks to its geographical location in the Caribbean, has many areas that are exploited for tourism. This includes its beaches and its scenery. The most exploited provinces in terms of tourism are concerned, after the era of Trujillo, are Puerto Plata, La Romana and La Altagracia, also worth noting that the del Este peninsula, is the country's most important tourist area.

Dominican tourism is an issue that is part of the daily lives of its citizens, because it depends largely on the economic livelihood of the same, and their way of life.

== Major tourist destinations in the Dominican Republic ==
Among the main tourist destinations are:

=== East Region ===
La Altagracia

It is the leading province in the country in terms of tourism, among the most important areas are:

- Bávaro: This area is located in the east of the Dominican Republic, in the province La Altagracia. According to a report by UNESCO, it recognizes the beaches of Bávaro as the best in the Caribbean Among its more popular activities include aquatic excursions such as snorkeling and catamaran tours on the beaches, as well as its luxury hotels.
- Higüey: The city of Higüey is within the tourist destinations in the province, since it is found, the Basilica of Our Lady of Altagracia and Sanctuary San Dionisio; also is the fortified residence of its founder, Juan Ponce de León, which is so visited by foreign tourists and communes and more inhabitants of the country.

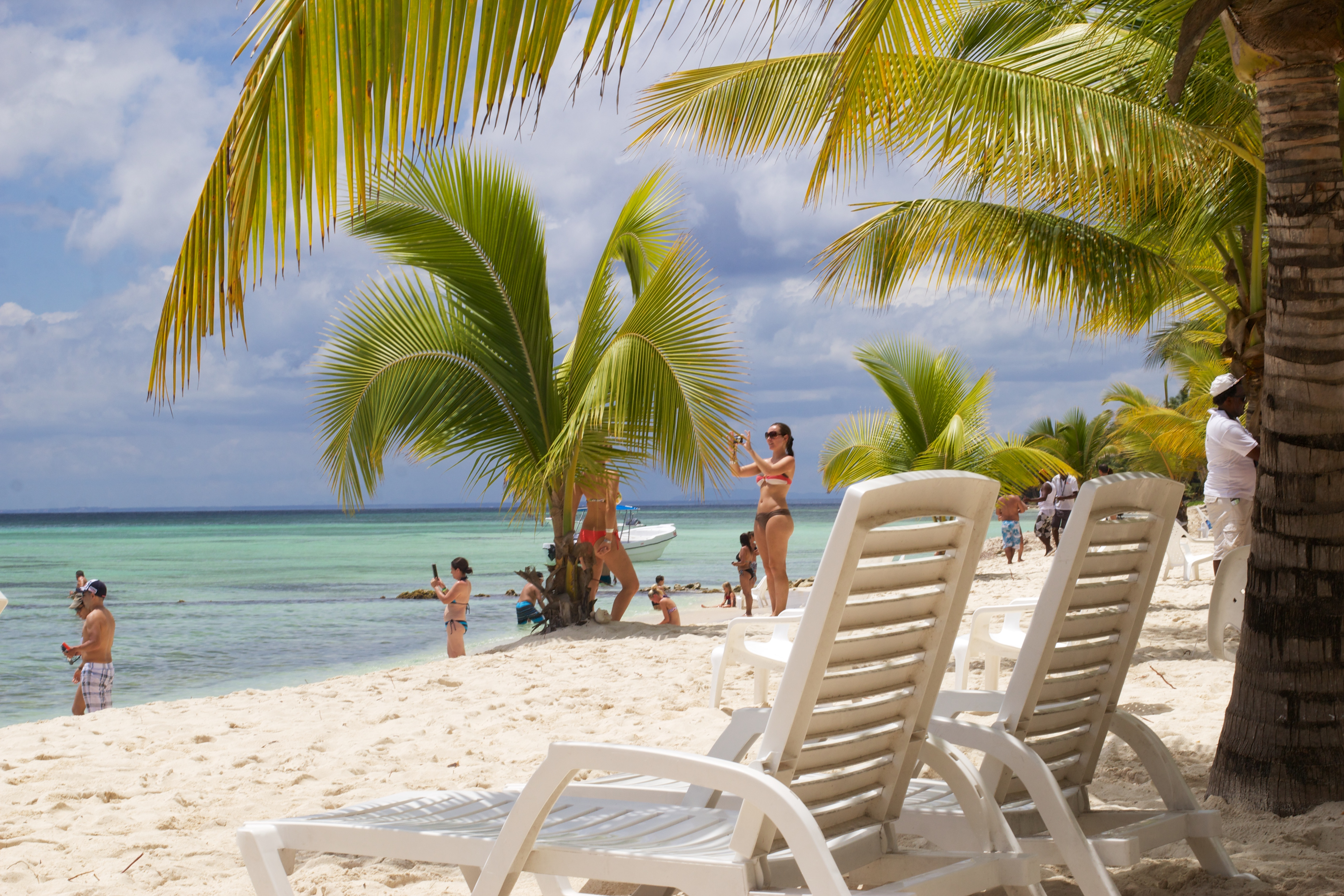
Saona Island, Dominican Republic

- Punta Cana: This resort area is located in the extreme east of the Dominican Republic, and it is one of the most important places for the realization of tourism in the country. To get to Punta Cana, it can be reached by vehicle through a 179 kilometers long corridor, consisting of sections of the highway of Las Américas, the Eastern Highway, the Ring of San Pedro de Macorís, the stretch San Pedro de Macorís-La Romana, La Romana Beltway and the Autopista del Coral; Similarly one can go via the Las Américas International Airport, or via the Punta Cana International Airport, which is about 2 km from the town of Punta Cana.

La Romana

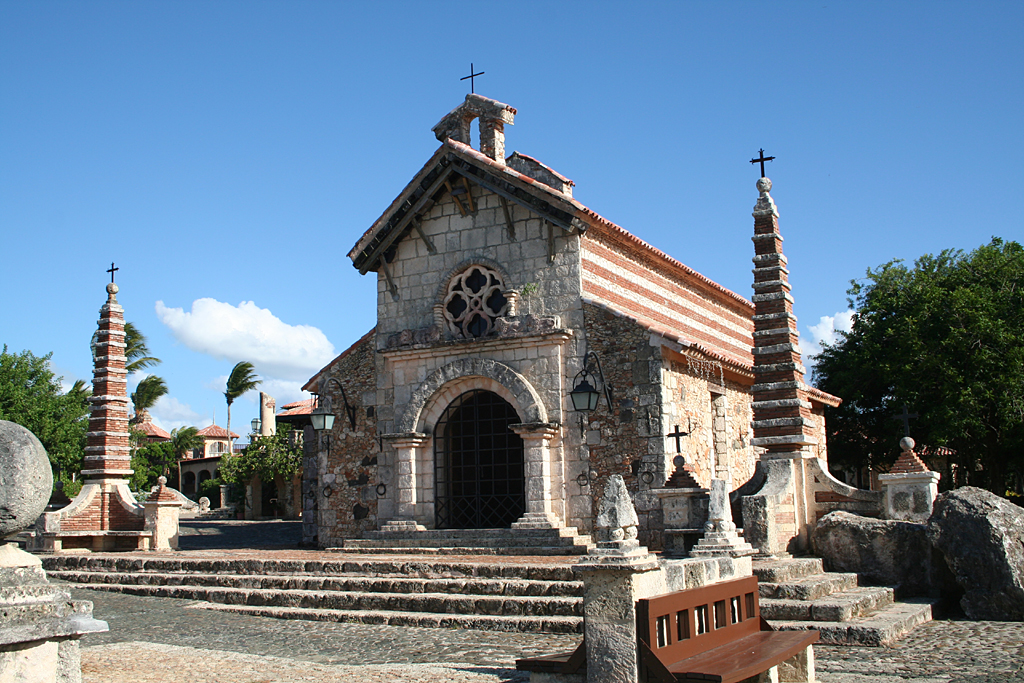
Altos de Chavón, La Romana

- La Romana: One of the main options for foreign tourists when choosing a destination for their holidays. La Romana has many beaches. To get to La Romana, it can through the La Romana International Airport or Punta Cana Airport. La Romana is the seventh-largest city in the Dominican Republic with a population estimated in 2010 at 130,426 within the city limits (metropolitan population: 214,109), of whom 127,623 are urban and 2,803 are rural. The city is capital of the southeastern province of La Romana, opposite Catalina Island. The name Romana comes from a balance that was used to weigh merchandise for export. Santa Rosa de Lima is the patron saint of La Romana. The modern La Romana International Airport was opened in 2000. The city is near several other cities, such as San Pedro de Macorís and the national capital, Santo Domingo de Guzmán. The city is a hub for a growing tourist industry with several nearby local resort spots, such as the beachfront Bayahibe, Dominicus, Casa de Campo, and the growing number of golf resorts that surround the area.
- Altos de Chavón: It is an old-type Mediterranean village built on a height above the Chavón River in Dominican Republic. It is the seat of a Cultural Centre, the National Archaeological Museum, and the called City of the Artists. also has a notable Amphitheater. The Altos de Chavón Amphitheater which has about 5,000 seats. It was opened in 1982.

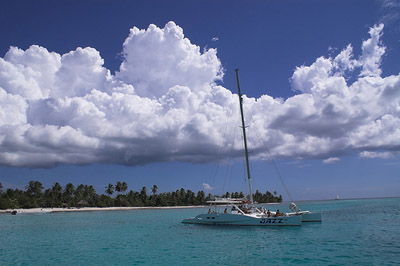
Boat anchored off in Saona Island.

- Saona Island: The Saona Island is considered as one of the most important trips or sightseeing tours of the country It is considered by the visitor as a natural paradise. Saona Island is about 110 kmª, and is the largest of the 13 adjacent islands of the country. This island offers fine white sand beaches, crystal clear waters. One of the biggest attractions is the "Natural Pool", which does not have a meter deep and it can see aquatic species such as coral reefs, marine meadowss, starfish and fish. The main white sand beaches of Isla Saona are located on the southern coast from Punta Catuano to Punta de Cruz except the area between the southern end of the beach of El Gato to Punta Laguna. The most important places of the Saona are the towns and villages of Mano Juan and Catuano; extensive white sand beaches and coral reefs with very clear waters; coconut trees along the coast, the Secucho lagoons, Los Flamencos and Canto de la Playa, the Alto de la Vigía (the highest point of the island); the Banks of Crowned Pigeon, the Mature Timberlands, cultivated areas and the town of Adamanay. Saona island belongs to the Park del Este. Along with los Haitises is the most important in the region and one of the main in the country, constituting the only wooded area of relative extension on the south coast of the eastern region. In this protected natural area are preserved semi-humid forests, coastal lagoons, mangroves, coral reefs, sea grasses. Also caverns with cultural values. Contains impressive archaeological sites like remains of indigenous settlements, ceremonial places perfectly preserved, sites of ceremonial offerings, large rock art and sunken colonial ships.
- Catalina Island: This island is a protected natural park where there are not any buildings.
- Bayahibe: Bayahibe is also suitable for sharing with family and friends, and is also a common place for golfers and for those who enjoy scuba diving. Bayahibe is the nearest point to take a trip to Catalina Island, Catalinita Island and Saona Island.

San Pedro de Macorís

- San Pedro de Macorís is a municipality (municipio) in the Dominican Republic and the capital of the San Pedro de Macorís province in the south-eastern region of the country; it is among the 10 largest cities of the Dominican Republic. The city has approximately 195,000 inhabitants, when including the metro area. As a provincial capital, it houses the Universidad Central del Este university.
- Juan Dolio: It is located just a few kilometers from the capital city of Santo Domingo and from San Pedro de Macoris. Juan Dolio is currently among the major tourist areas of the country.

=== Santo Domingo ===
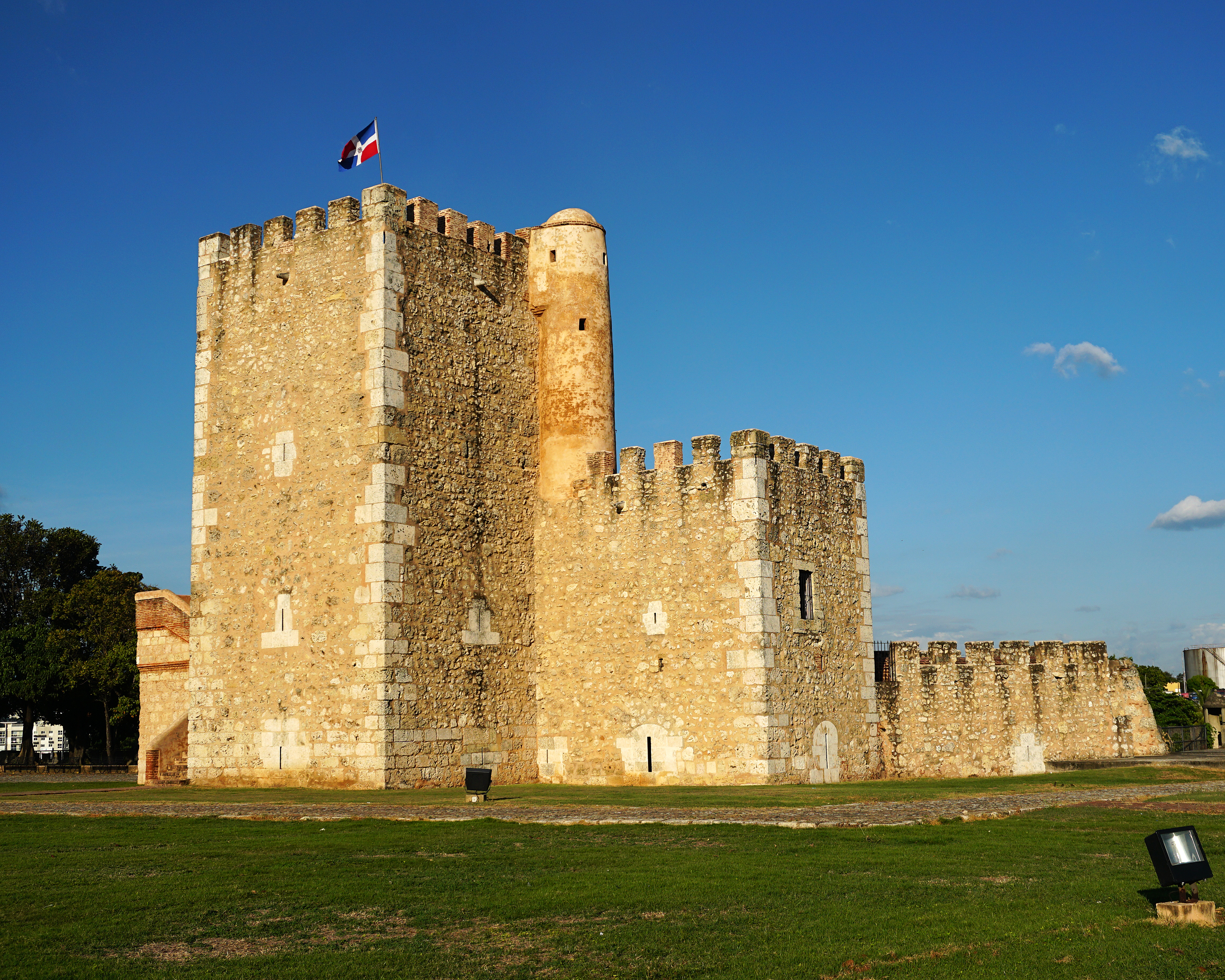
The Ozama Fortress is one of the surviving sections of the Walls of Santo Domingo, which is recognized by UNESCO as being the oldest military construction of European origin in the Americas.

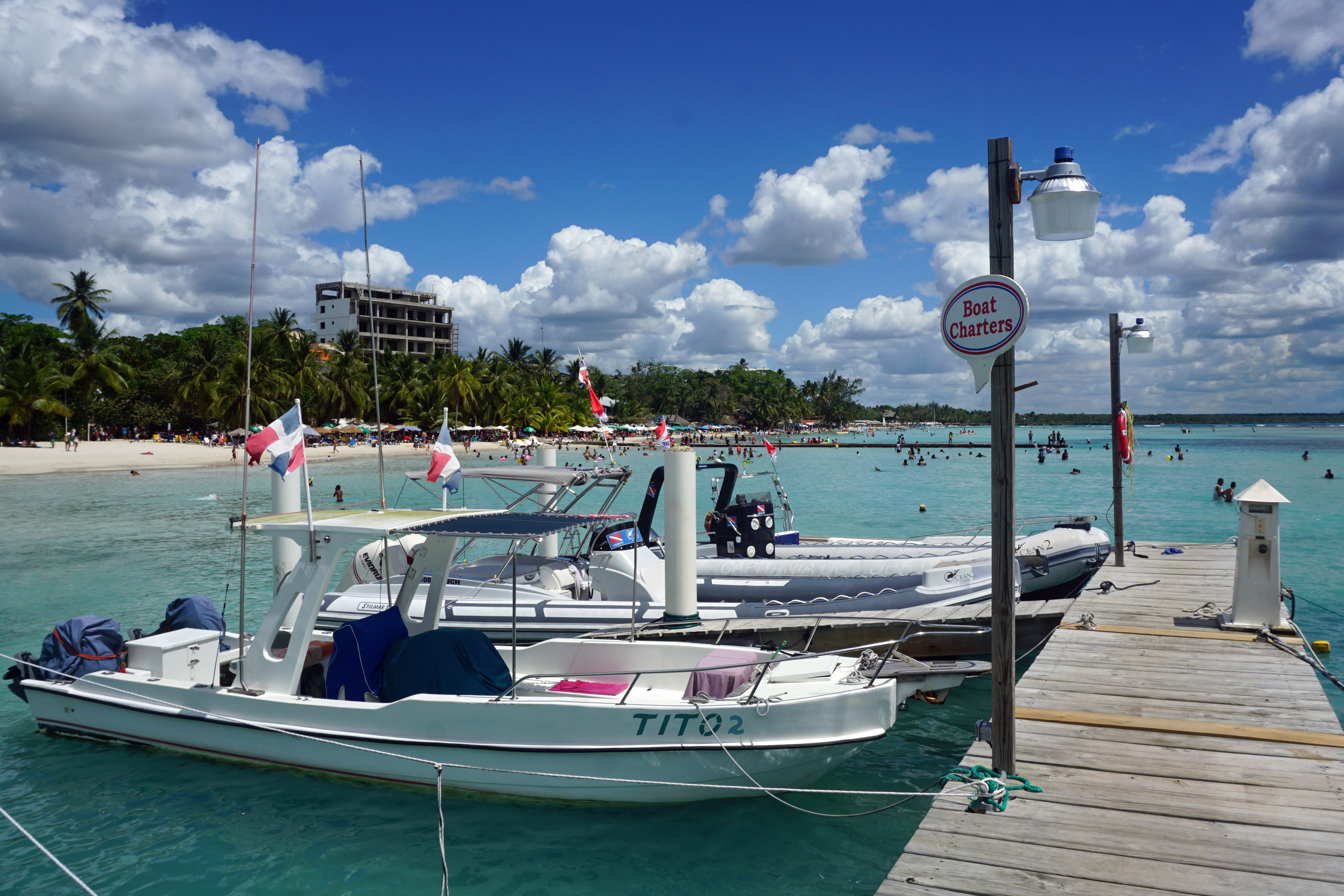
Boca Chica beach is located close to Santo Domingo

- Santo Domingo: Santo Domingo has a main tourist area, the Colonial Zone, as well as historical monuments, of which most were built by the Spaniards who originally colonized the island.
- Boca Chica: It is one of the most popular places in the Dominican Republic, due to its beach. It is located about 40 kilometers and 35 minutes from Santo Domingo eastward passing the Las Américas International Airport.

=== North Region or Cibao ===
Santiago de los Caballeros

Santiago de los Caballeros or simply Santiago (English: Saint James of the Thirty Knights) is the second-largest city in the Dominican Republic, and the fourth-largest city in the Caribbean. It is the capital of the Santiago Province and the major metropolis in the north-central region of the country. Its urban population reaches 550,753 inhabitants, and if rural areas are included its population rises to 691,262.Santiago is located approximately 155 km (96 mi) northwest of Santo Domingo with an average altitude of 178 meters (584 ft). It was traditionally known in English as St. Yago. During the Haitian occupation from 1822 to 1844 it was officially designated as Saint-Yague. Founded in 1495 during the first wave of European settlement in the New World, the city is the "first Santiago of the Americas". Today the city is one of the Dominican Republic's cultural, political, industrial, and financial centers. Due to its location in the fertile Cibao Valley it has a robust agricultural sector and is a leading exporter of rum, textiles, and cigars. Santiago is known as "La Ciudad Corazón" (the "Heartland City").

Puerto Plata

Puerto Plata is officially known as San Felipe de Puerto Plata, is the ninth-largest city in the Dominican Republic, and capital of the province of Puerto Plata. The city is a trading port. Puerto Plata has resorts such as Playa Dorada and Costa Dorada, which are located east of the city proper. There are 100,000 hotel beds in the city. The only aerial tramway in the Caribbean is located in Puerto Plata, in which visitors can ride up to the Pico Isabel de Torres, a 793 meter high mountain within the city. The fortification Fortaleza San Felipe, which was built in the 16th century and served as a prison under Rafael Trujillo's dictatorship, lies close to the port of Puerto Plata. The amber museum, is also a well-known attraction in this city. La Isabela, a settlement built by Christopher Columbus, is located near Puerto Plata. In April 1563, the Spanish settlement became notorious when the English slave trader Sir John Hawkins brought 400 people he had abducted from Sierra Leone. Hawkins traded his victims with the Spanish for pearls, hides, sugar and some gold. This was the start of British involvement in the trans-Atlantic slave trade. During the 1822–44 Haitian occupation it was officially designated as Port-de-Plate.

- Puerto Plata (city)
- Sosúa
- Playa Dorada
- Cabarete

Samaná
Samaná (town)

Samana is a small town on the island that is a popular destination for tourists mainly because of whale season. Every year in the spring, many whales arrive in the Samana bay. Tourists come from all over the world to board ships and whale watch. This is a large source of income to a town that otherwise would have an economy mainly driven by fishing.

- Las Terrenas

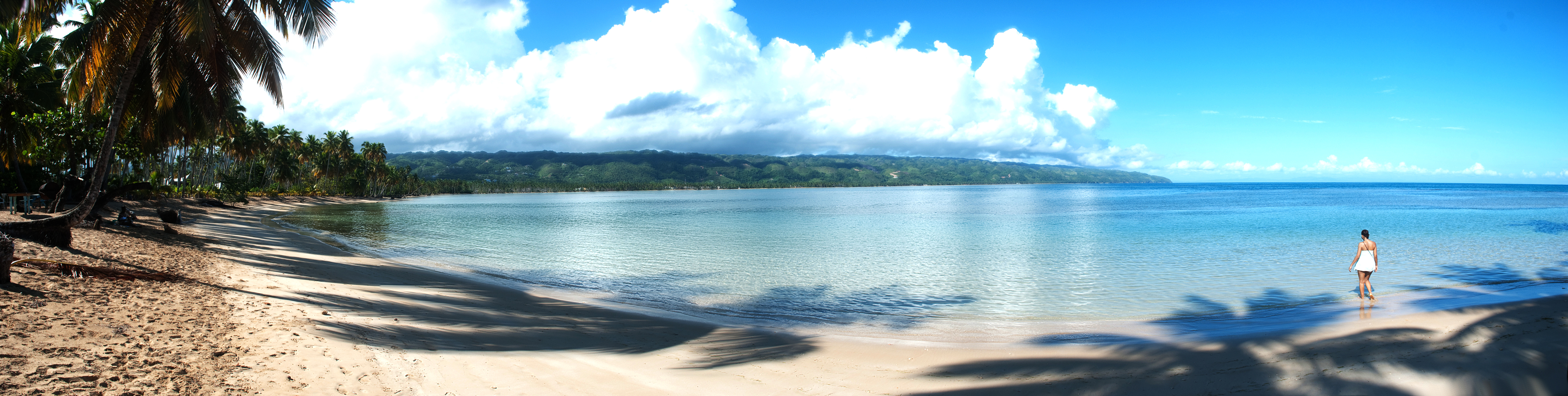
Las Terrenas beach

La Vega

- La Vega (city)
- Constanza
- Jarabacoa
- Bonao

María Trinidad Sánchez

- Nagua
- Río San Juan

Montecristi

=== South Region ===
Baní

San Cristóbal

Barahona (city)

Pedernales
Azua (city)

== Gallery ==
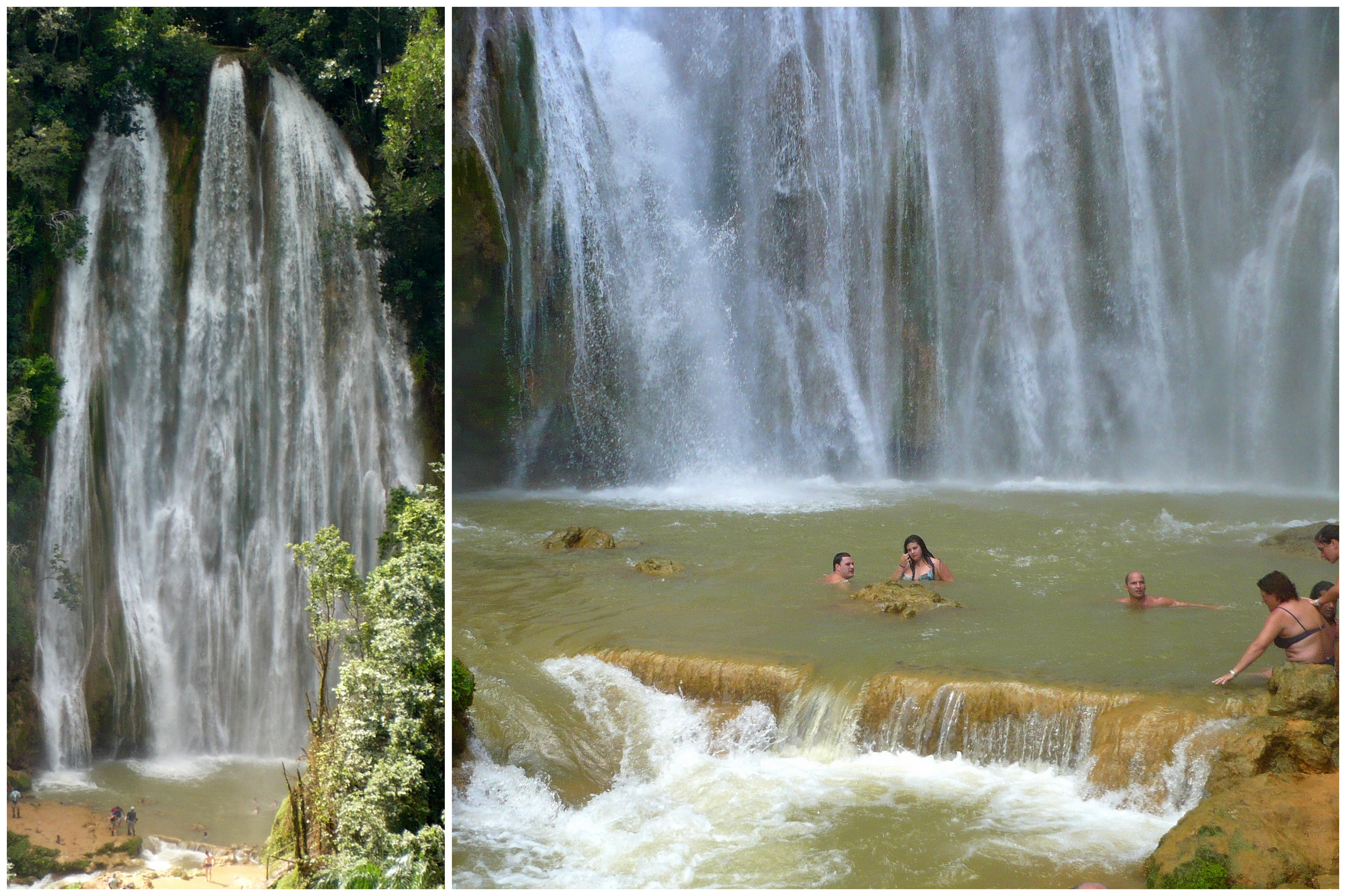
There are numerous beautiful waterfalls across the Dominican Republic. In the picture is Salto del Limón

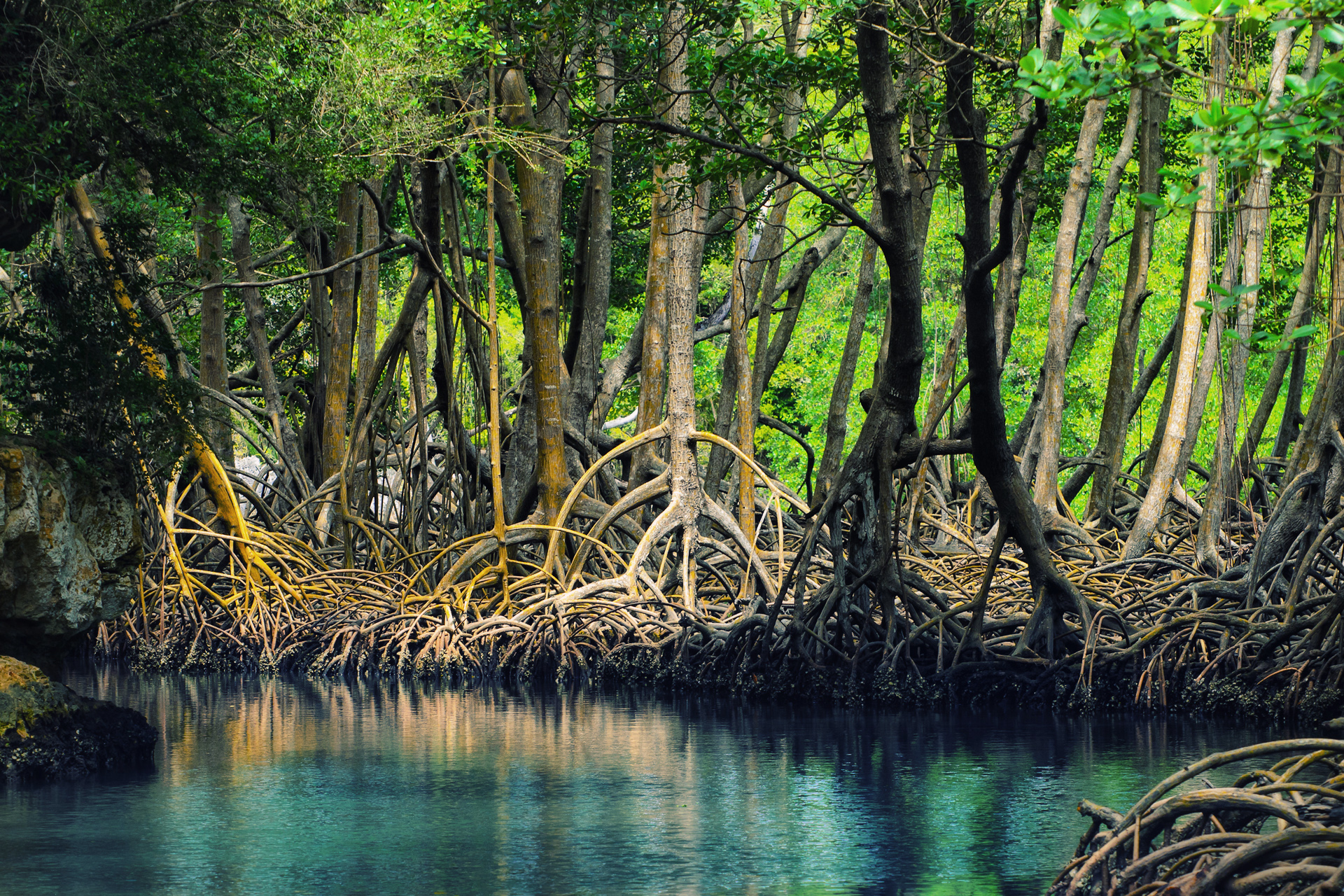
Mangroves in Los Haitises National Park

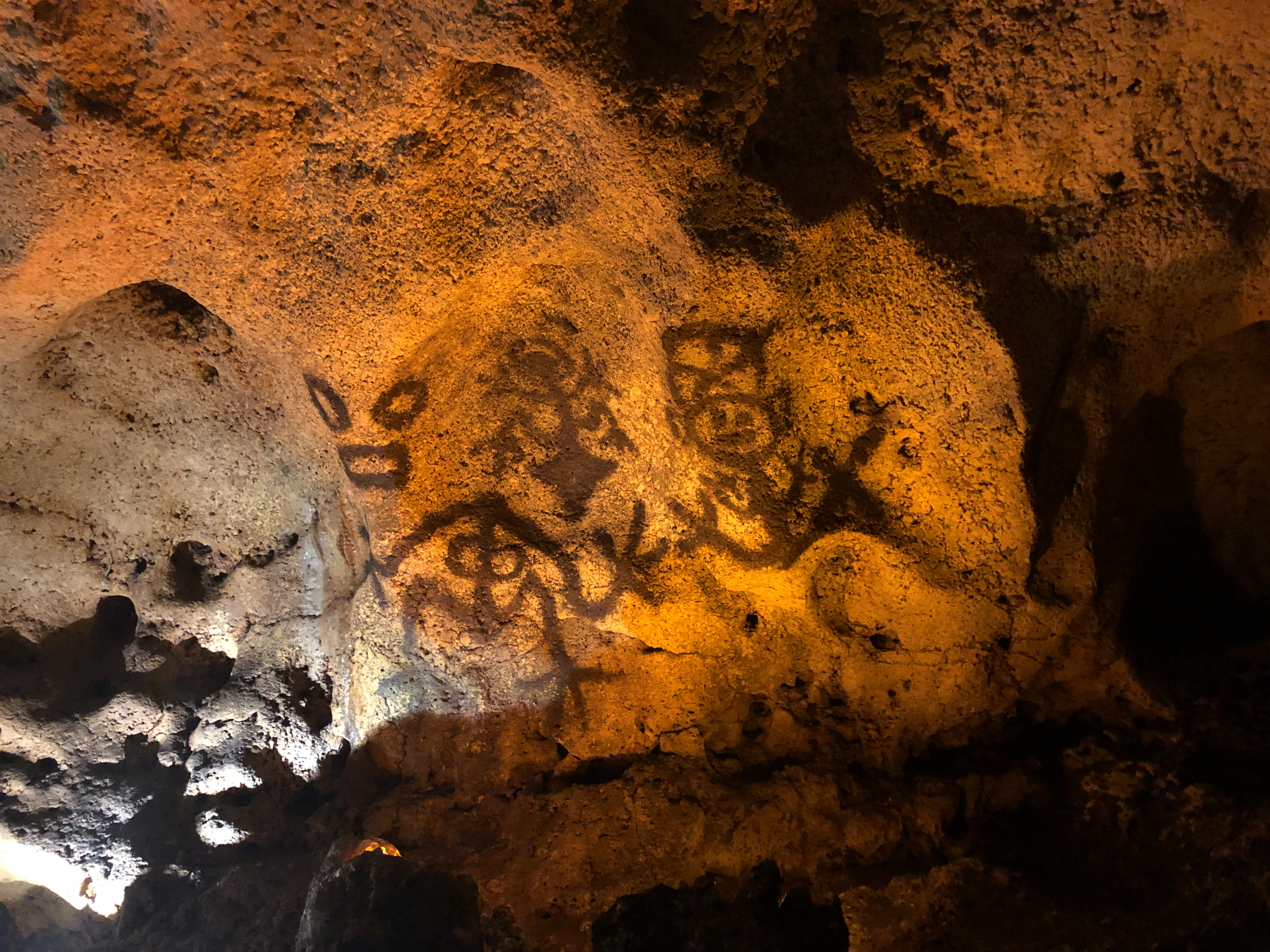
Taíno pictographs at the Cueva de las Maravillas National Park

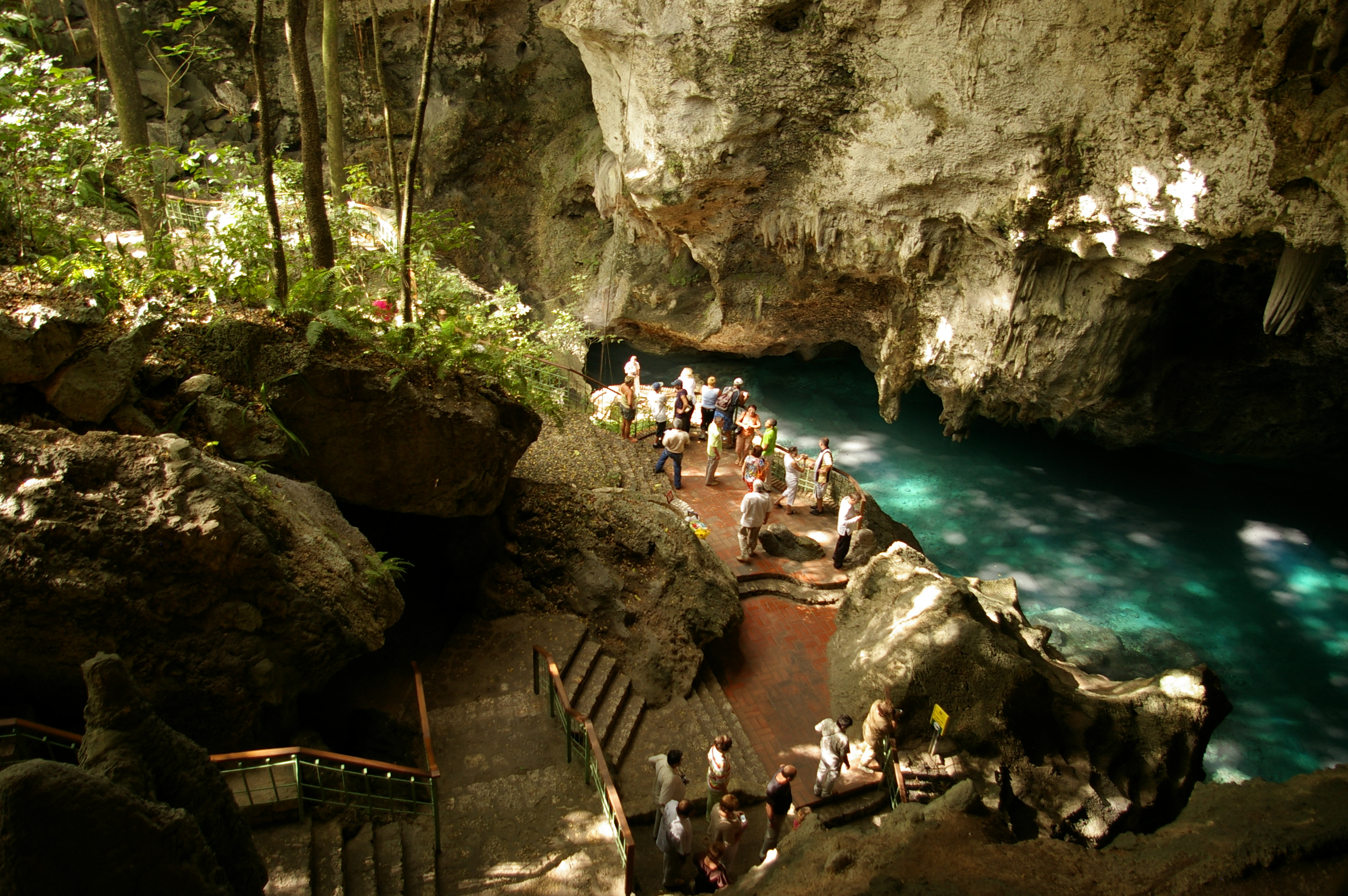
Los Tres Ojos National Park

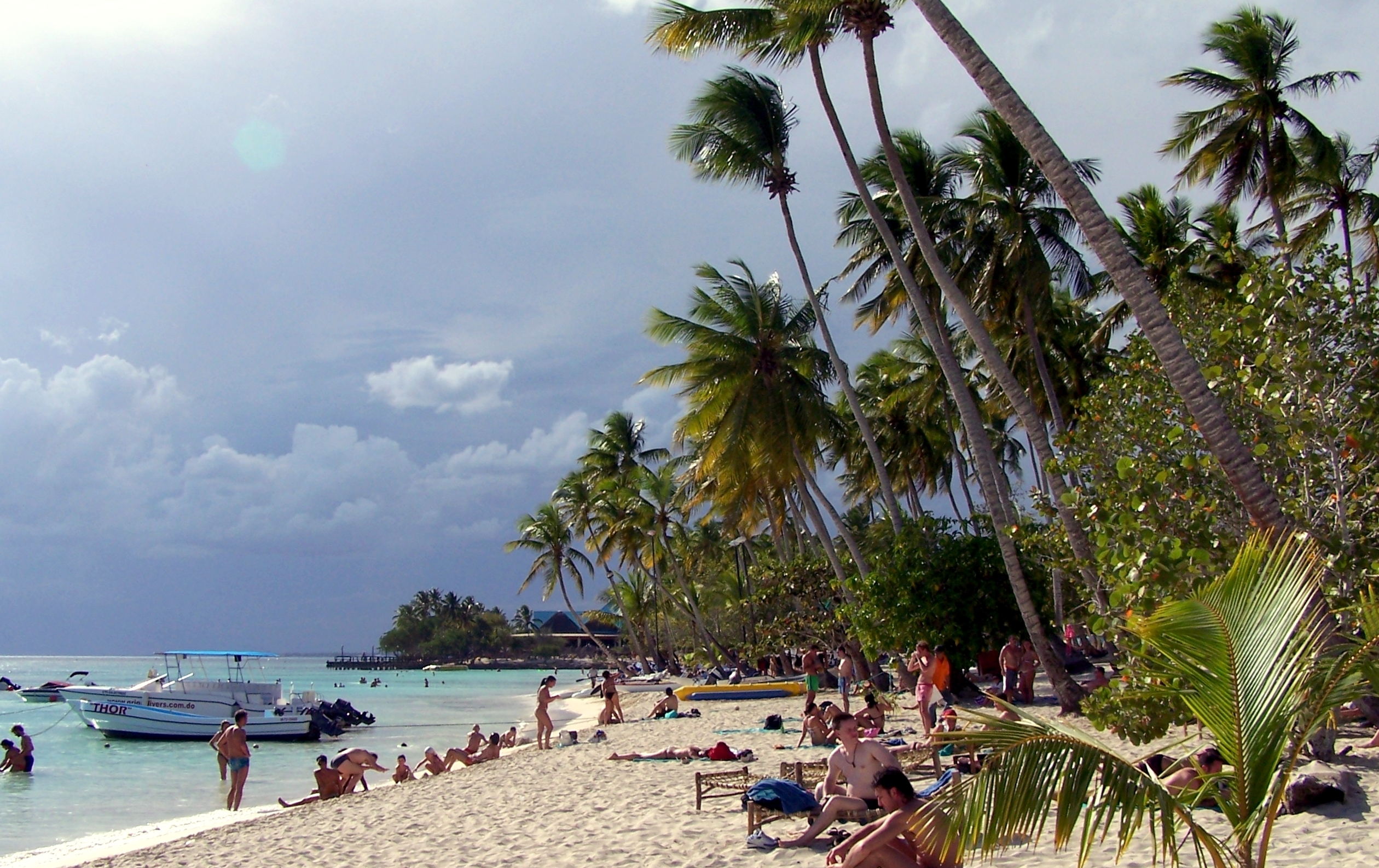
Bayahibe Beach

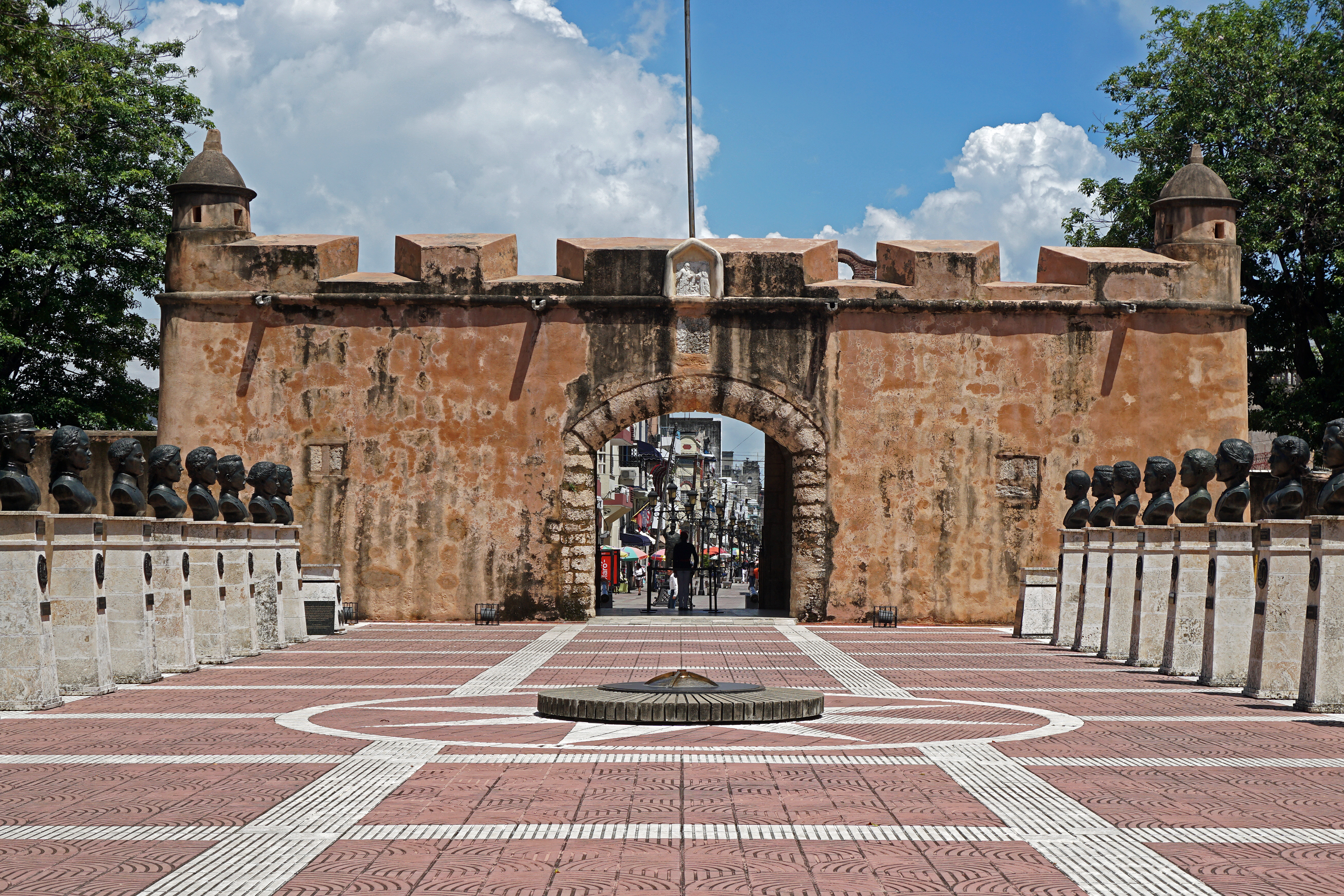
Puerta del Conde City Gate, one of the remaining preserved sections of the Walls of Santo Domingo, the city is a UNESCO WHS and the oldest continuously inhabited European settlement in the Americas.

Church and Convent of los Dominicos at Santo Domingo

== See also ==
- Visa policy of the Dominican Republic
- Tourism in the Caribbean
- List of airports in the Dominican Republic
