= Casa de Campo, Dominican Republic =

Seaside resort in La Romana, Dominican Republic

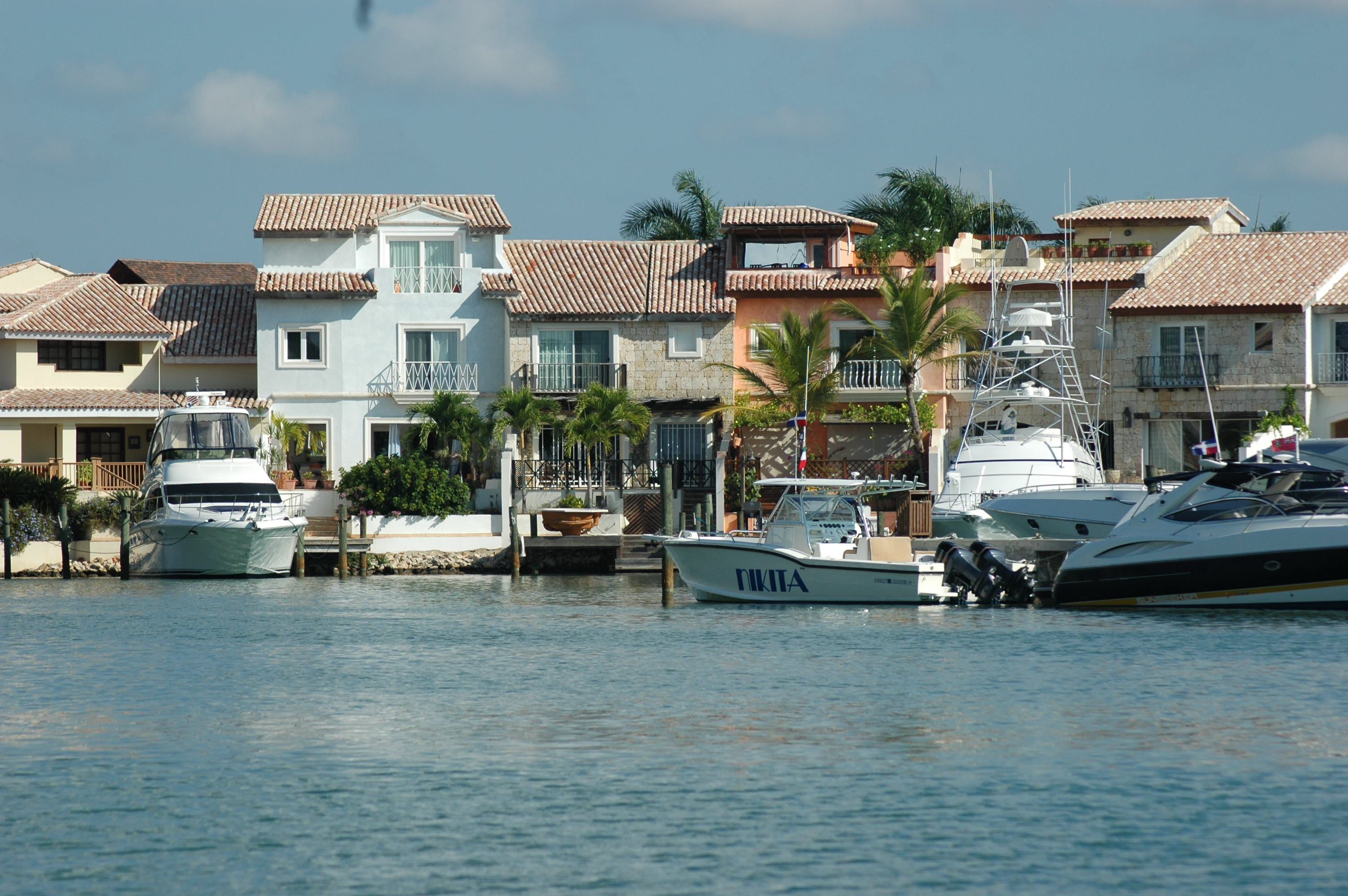
Marina of Casa de Campo, La Romana, Dominican Republic.

Casa de Campo (Spanish for "Country House") is a Ponderosa-style tropical seaside residential community in La Romana on the southeast coast of the Dominican Republic. It was developed in the 1970s by Gulf and Western Industries on 7,000 acres (28 km^{2}) of its Central Romana sugar mill's land.

== History ==
The name is Spanish for "Country House," and it was originally a retreat for Charles Bluhdorn, who built his estate during the 1970s on Gulf and Western's sugar mill property, Central Romana. When he died in 1983, it became the first resort in the country. One of Bluhdorn's friends, the famous Dominican designer Oscar de la Renta, was hired to do the interior design for Casa de Campo. After Bluhdorn's death, the Cuban-American Fanjul family bought Casa and opened it to paying guests.

== Villas and marina ==
There are two types of villas that can be owned: "punto de villas" and "villas con solar propio". "Punto de villas" own only the land, with parking lots and landscaped spaces as common areas. "Villas con solar propio" have ownership of an entire area, which includes parking lots and the landscape. About 10% of the residences at the resort are low-rise condos in buildings no higher than four levels. About 70% of the properties are large estates.

Casa de Campo has over 1,700 private villas, which range in price from US$1,000,000 to US$24,000,000, making it also one of the countries' most affluent communities, comparable to the Hamptons.

Completed in 2000, Casa de Campo has a modern, 400-berth marina, complete with a shipyard with a 120-ton TraveLift designed by Italian architect, Gian Franco Fini to resemble Portofino. Surrounding this harbor are over 70 restaurants, shops, bars, and homes. In 2010, the Casa de Campo Marina played host to the Rolex Farr 40 sailing cup.

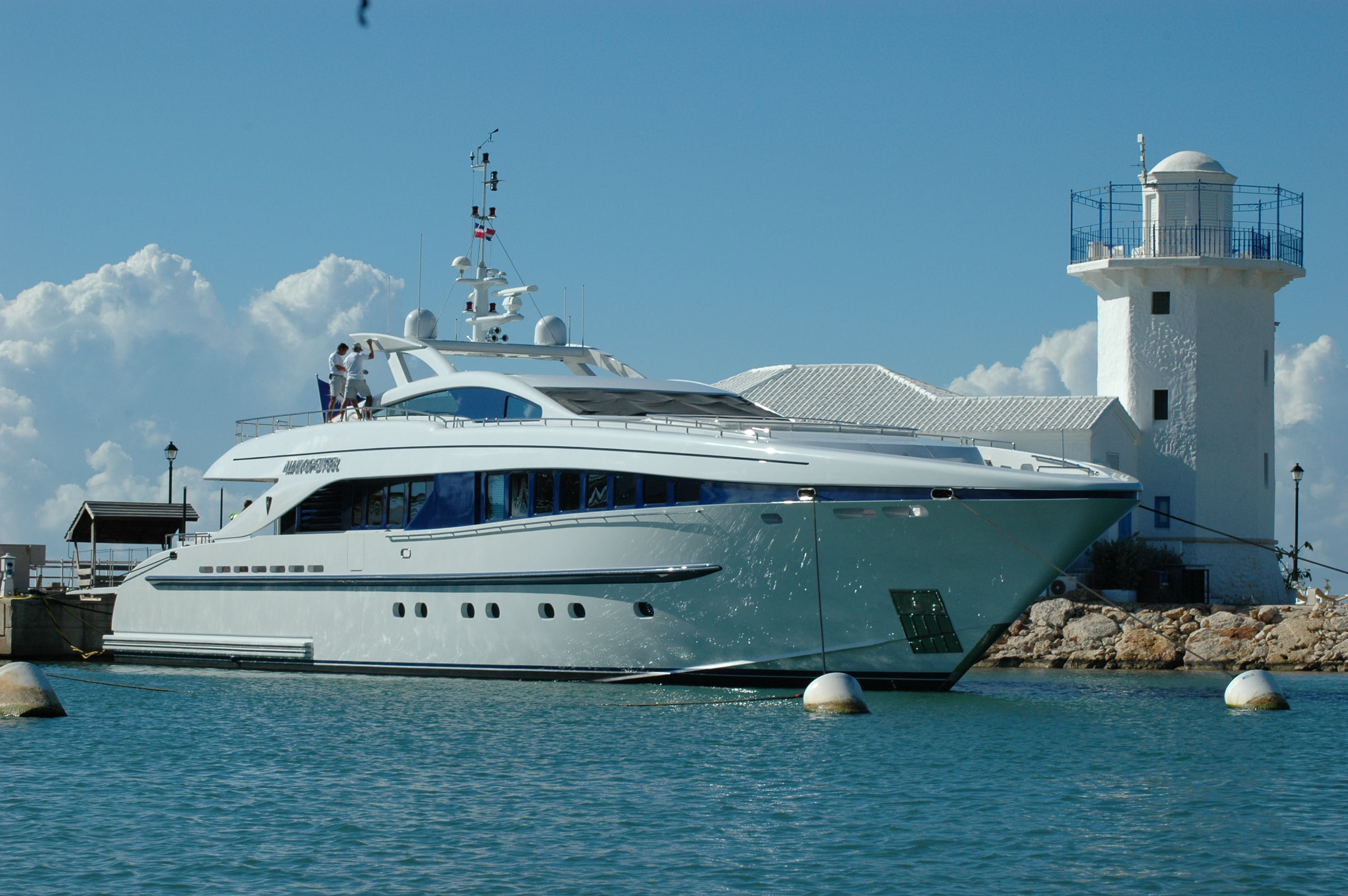

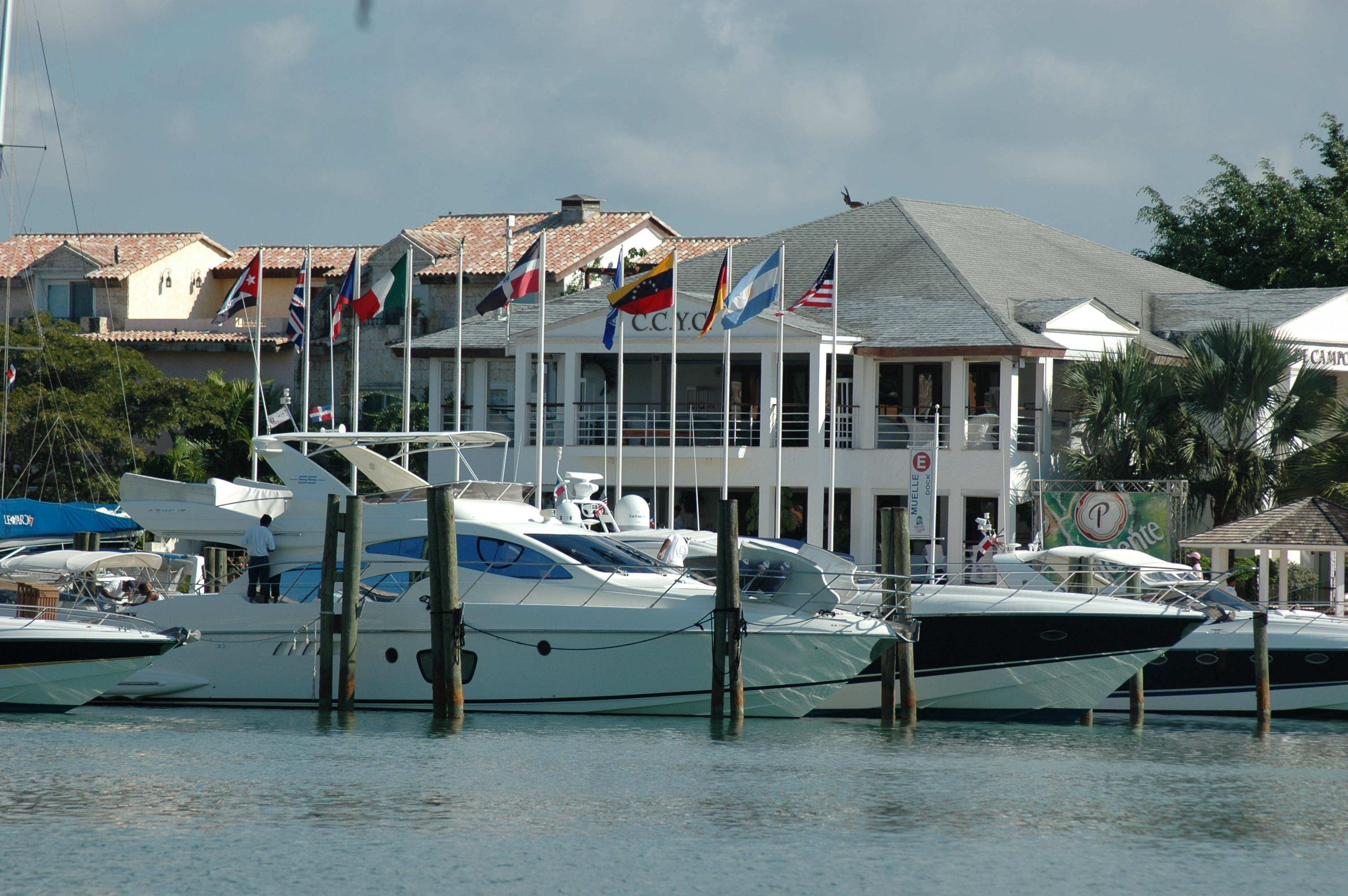

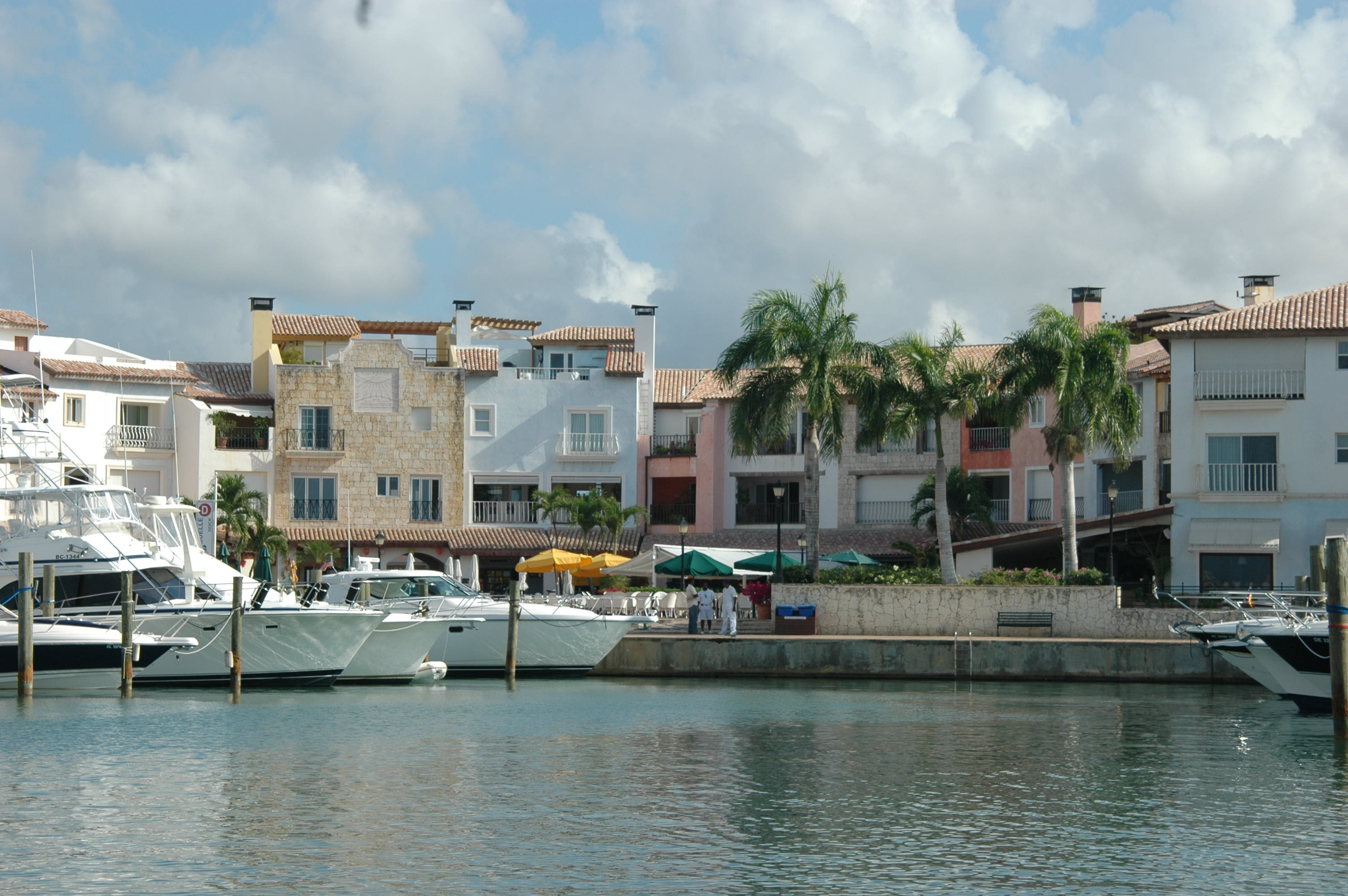

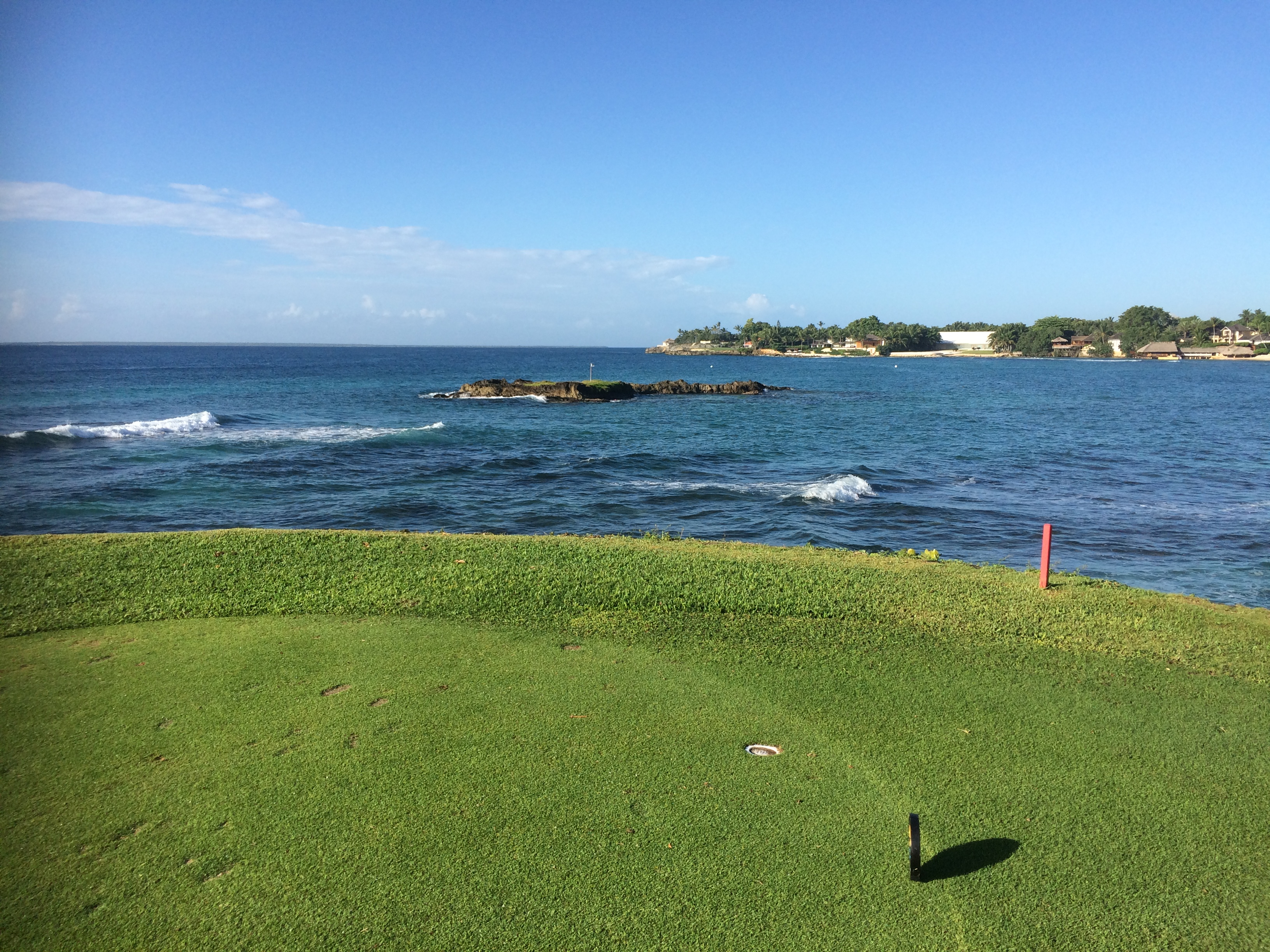

== Golf course ==
Casa de Campo
- Interactive map of Casa de Campo
- 18°24′00″N 68°55′00″W

Club information
- Location: La Romana, Dominican Republic
- Established: 1971
- Type: Public
- Owner: Central Romana Corporation
- Website: Casa de Campo - Golf

Teeth of the Dog
- Designed by: Pete Dye
- Par: 72
- Length: 6,888
- Course rating: 74.1

Dye Fore
- Designed by: Pete Dye
- Par: 72
- Length: 7,770
- Course rating: 77.0

The Links Course
- Designed by: Pete Dye
- Par: 71
- Length: 6,461
- Course rating: 70

Golf architects Pete and Alice Dye have had a home at Casa de Campo since the early 1970s, when they guided 300 local laborers with machetes to blaze the Diente de Perro (Teeth of the Dog, opened in 1971) through the jungle and along a rocky coast. The course served as a backdrop for the 1971 Sports Illustrated Swimsuit Issue.

It remains the only Caribbean course consistently ranked in the world's top 100 courses (usually in the top 50). The Links Course (opened in 1974) and the members-only La Romana Country Club (opened in 1990) are inland layouts spiced with lakes. Dye's newest course, the much-acclaimed Dye Fore (opened in 2000), skirts cliffs 300 feet (91 m) above the Chavón River, with views of the village of Altos de Chavón, distant mountains and the new marina. Dye recently completed another course on the plateau next to Dye Fore, called the Dye Fore Lakes. Annually, Casa de Campo hosts The Sugar Golf Tournament hosting approximately 300 golfers.

=== Significant events held at Casa de Campo ===
- 1974 Eisenhower Trophy
- 1974 Espirito Santo Trophy
- 1994 Shell's Wonderful World of Golf (Raymond Floyd vs. Fred Couples)
- 2014 Dominican Republic Open
- 2016 Latin America Amateur Championship
- 2019 Latin America Amateur Championship
- 2022 Latin America Amateur Championship

== Sports Illustrated ==
Casa de Campo served as the backdrop for the 1987 Sports Illustrated Swimsuit Issue.
