= Joiri Minaya =

Dominican American visual artist (born 1990)

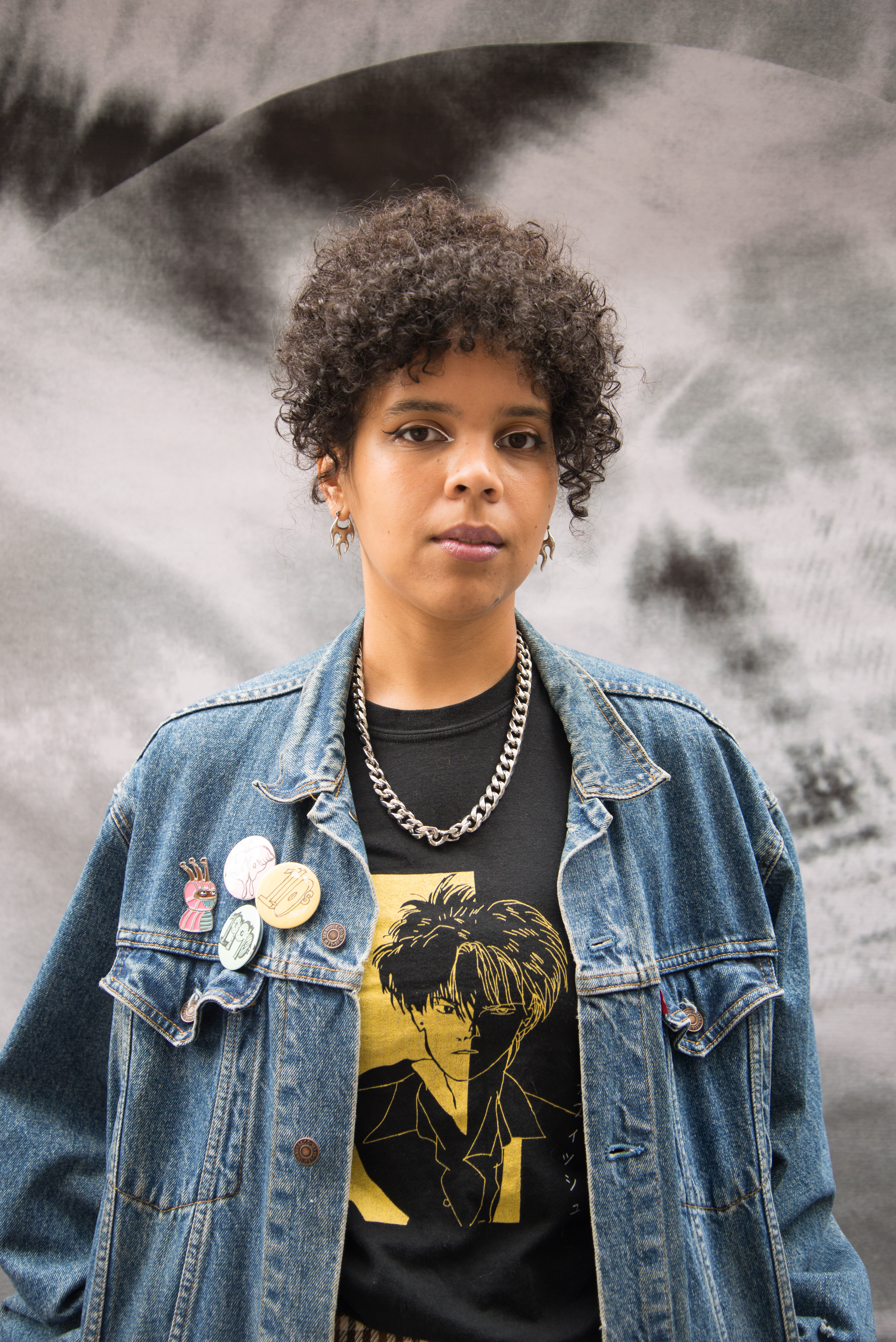
- Artist Joiri Minaya at Black Lunch Table x Skowhegan Block Party 2021
- Born: 1990 (age 35–36); New York City, New York, U.S.
- Education: Escuela Nacional de Artes Visuales, Altos de Chavón School of Design, Parsons School of Design

Joiri Minaya (born 1990) is an American multidisciplinary artist of Dominican-descent. She works with digital media, photography, film, performance, sculpture, textiles and painting. Minaya is based in New York City.

== Early life and education ==
Joiri Minaya was born in 1990 in New York City, New York. She was raised in the Dominican Republic. Minaya graduated from the National School of Visual Arts of Santo Domingo in the Dominican Republic (2009), the Altos de Chavón School of Design (2011) and Parsons School of Design (2013).

== Art ==
Minaya's artwork is inspired by her life experience growing up in the Dominican Republic, as well as living and navigating the United States. She explores ideas of identity, in context of colonialism and stereotypes.

Minaya has done a variety of installation-based pieces, many of which focus on patterns, textiles and their cultural implications. Containers (2015) is a photography and performance art piece, first performed in Socrates Sculpture Park in 2016. The work included women dressed in spandex body suits with a bright tropical print. #dominicanwomengooglesearch (2016) was a hanging sculptural piece in which Minaya took images from the results of the Google Search "Dominican women", and edited them with Photoshop. Each component was enlarged, printed, and hung up along with silhouettes created with tropical patterns.

Minaya also works with sculpture: Perteneciente (Belonging) (2013) contains two female busts, which are connected by a thick braid of hair. A more recent work is Tropticon (2018), a greenhouse in Socrates Sculpture Park in Long Island, New York. The outer walls of the greenhouse are covered with images of pixelated tropical plants.

Minaya was featured on Art21's series New York Close Up in 2023. She created a commissioned installation for Prospect 6 in 2024 titled The Future Is Present, The Harbinger Is Home at the New Orleans African American Museum (NOAAM), in the historic Tremé neighbor.

In 2025, Joiri Minaya's work is included in Narratives in Focus: Selections from PAMM's Collection, a photography exhibition featuring a constellation of artworks from the Pérez Art Museum Miami, Florida.

== Exhibitions ==
This is a select list of notable exhibitions by Minaya.

=== Solo exhibitions ===
- 2015 Doméstica Foránea, Centro de la Imagen, Santo Domingo, R.D.
- 2016 #dominicanwomengooglesearch, Sunroom Project Space at Wave Hill, Bronx, NY, U.S.
- 2016 Uncatered (solo show), Guttenberg Arts, NJ, U.S.
- 2016 Redecode: a tropical theme is a great way to create a fresh, peaceful, relaxing atmosphere, El Museo del Barrio, NY, U.S.
- 2019 Labadee, Blanton Museum of Art (University of Texas at Austin), Austin, TX, U.S.
- 2026 The Banner Project: Joiri Minaya, Museum of Fine Arts, Boston, Boston, Massachusetts, U.S.

=== Group exhibitions ===
- 2016 Art + Crush: Elliot Jerome Brown Jr., Platform Gallery, Baltimore, MD, U.S.
- 2016 Pulse / Trigger, Sine Gallery, Newark, NJ, U.S.
- 2016 20th Anniversary Show, Smack Mellon, Brooklyn, NY, U.S.
- 2016 Intro, Lucy García Arte Contemporáneo, Santo Domingo, D.R.
- 2016 Living in My Skin, Río III Gallery, Broadway Housing Communities, NY, U.S.
- 2016 Samsøñ Gallery selection of works for NADA Art Fair, NY, U.S.
- 2016 Gloria, Casa Quien, Santo Domingo, D.R.
- 2016 Remix en Caraïbe at Tropiques Atrium, Fort-de-France, Martinique.
- 2024 The Future Is Present, The Harbinger Is Home, New Orleans African American Museum (NOAAM)
- 2025 Narratives in Focus: Selections from PAMM's Collection, Pérez Art Museum Miami, Florida

== Awards ==
- 2013 Exhibition Prize 2014, Centro de la Imagen, Santo Domingo, R.D.
- 2013 Great Prize XXVII Bienal de Artes Visuales, Museo de Arte Moderno, Santo Domingo, R.D.
- 2014 Great Prize XXV Concurso de Arte Eduardo León Jimenes, Centro León, Santiago, D.R.
- 2015 Audience Award, XXV Concurso de Arte Eduardo León Jimenes, Centro León, Santiago, D.R.
- 2015 Joan Mitchell Foundation Emerging Artist Grant
- 2016 Rema Hort Mann Emerging Artist Grant
