= Love is not tourism =

Grassroots movement during COVID-19 pandemic

Love is not tourism is an international grassroots movement of couples that due to restrictions in place in reaction to the COVID-19 pandemic could not meet their partners. The movement was formed in June 2020 by unknown individuals and quickly spread onto various social media platforms. The German programmer Felix Urbasik created a website to promote the campaign of essential travels to people committed in a relationship to meet in person safely during the pandemic. The campaign was partially successful among some of the countries part of the European Union to make concessions to people trying to meet up with their partner.

The site is currently a wiki, allowing anyone to contribute to information regarding travel bans on every country.

== History ==
The exact origins of the movement are unknown. The largest Facebook group with the name "Love Is Not Tourism" was created on 27 June 2020. The earliest use of the hashtag #LoveIsNotTourism on Twitter was on 4 June 2020.

On 5 July 2020, Felix Urbasik created the website loveisnottourism.org to promote the movement and achieve travel exemptions for couples in committed relationships, including both married and unmarried couples.

In May 2021, the site turned in a wiki, allowing users to contribute with information about travel bans of each country.

=== Europe ===
By July 2020, some European countries opened their borders for people in this situation, including Austria, Czech Republic, Denmark, Finland, France, Germany, Italy, Norway, The Netherlands, Spain and Switzerland. However, many couples reported that the demands of these countries to prove the couple was in fact a relationship were hard, which meant that many missed the holidays or Valentine's Day.

=== North America ===
The United States government, then under the Trump administration, was asked during a press briefing if the US government was thinking about waiving the travel ban imposed in that year. The reporter mentioned the campaign in her question. Kayleigh McEnany answered saying that the president was not asked or told about those specific cases – those of couples – but that the focus was on "... to protect American lives".

In February 2021, now under the Biden administration, Americans urged president Biden to allow unmarried couples to "safely reunite", with an online petition created in that same month. Similar petitions circulated online.

== See also ==
- Impact of the COVID-19 pandemic on tourism
