= Altos de Chavón =

Tourist attraction in La Romana, Dominican Republic

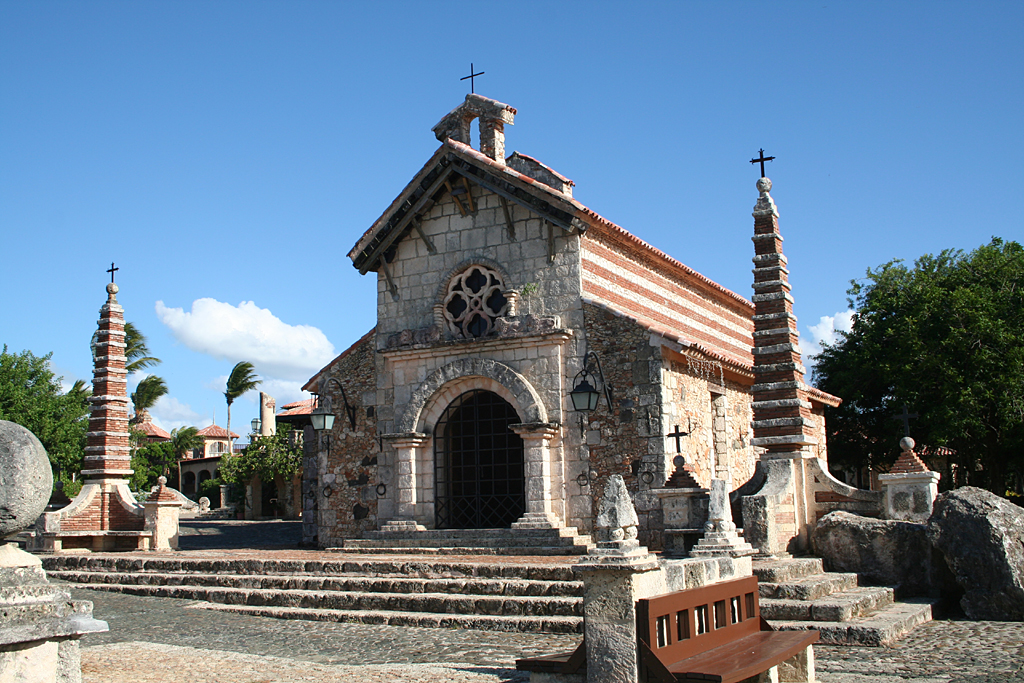
- St. Stanislaus Church
- Interactive map of Altos de Chavón
- Location: La Romana, Dominican Republic
- Coordinates: 18°25′13″N 68°53′23″W
- Owner: Central Romana Corporation
- Capacity: 5,000
- Type: Amphitheater

Construction
- Opened: August 1982

Website
- Altos de Chavón Amphitheater

Altos de Chavón is a tourist attraction and recreation of a Mediterranean village located atop the Chavón River in La Romana, Dominican Republic. It is the most popular attraction in the city and hosts a cultural center, an archeological museum, and an amphitheater. The project was conceived by the Italian architect Roberto Copa and the industrialist Charles Bluhdorn.

== History ==
The project began in 1976, when a stone mountain had to be blasted for the construction of a nearby road. Charles Bluhdorn, chairman of then Paramount Pictures parent company Gulf+Western, had the idea of using the stones to re-create a sixteenth-century style Mediterranean village, similar to some of the architecture found in the historic center of Santo Domingo. Construction was completed in the early 1980s. Bluhdorn's daughter, Dominique Bluhdorn, is the current president of the Altos de Chavón Cultural Center Foundation.

Narrow, cobble-covered alleyways lined with lanterns and shuttered limestone walls yield several Mediterranean-style restaurants, a number of quaint shops featuring craftwork of local artisans, and three galleries exhibiting local students.

== Altos de Chavón School of Design ==
The on-site design school, Altos de Chavón School of Design (Spanish: Altos de Chavón La Escuela de Diseño) was founded in 1983. It is an affiliate school of Parsons School of Design in New York City. Notable attendees of the Altos de Chavón Design School have included Lisa Thon, Joiri Minaya, Jenny Polanco and Mía Lourdes Taveras López.

Altos de Chavón School of Design offers full-time degree programs as well as continuing education courses and after-school programs for kids and teens.

== St. Stanislaus Church ==
St. Stanislaus Church was built in 1979 on the village’s central plaza. Its Neoclassical façade features a small rose window and a bell gable with two bells, accessible by an exterior staircase.

Adding authenticity to the project is the St. Stanislaus Church (Iglesia San Estanislao de Cracovia in Spanish). With its plaza and sparkling fountain, it is a popular wedding venue. The St. Stanislaus Church was named after the patron saint of Poland, Stanislaus of Szczepanów in tribute to Pope John Paul II who visited Santo Domingo in 1979 and left some of the saint's ashes behind. It was in this church that Prince Louis, Duke of Anjou married Venezuelan heiress María Margarita Vargas Santaella on 6 November 2004.

== Amphitheater ==
A Roman-styled 5,000-seat amphitheater hosts 20th century musical acts—The Pet Shop Boys, Frank Sinatra, and Julio Iglesias to name a few—while Génesis nightclub provides a popular dance venue for guests from the Casa de Campo resort nearby. The Regional Museum of Archaeology (El Museo Arqueológico Regional) contains a collection of pre-Columbian Indian artifacts unearthed in the surrounding area. Altos de Chavón overlooks Rio Chavón and the Dye Fore golf course of Casa de Campo.

The Concert for the Americas was held here in August 1982. Performers included Frank Sinatra, Buddy Rich, Heart and Santana.

Altos de Chavón

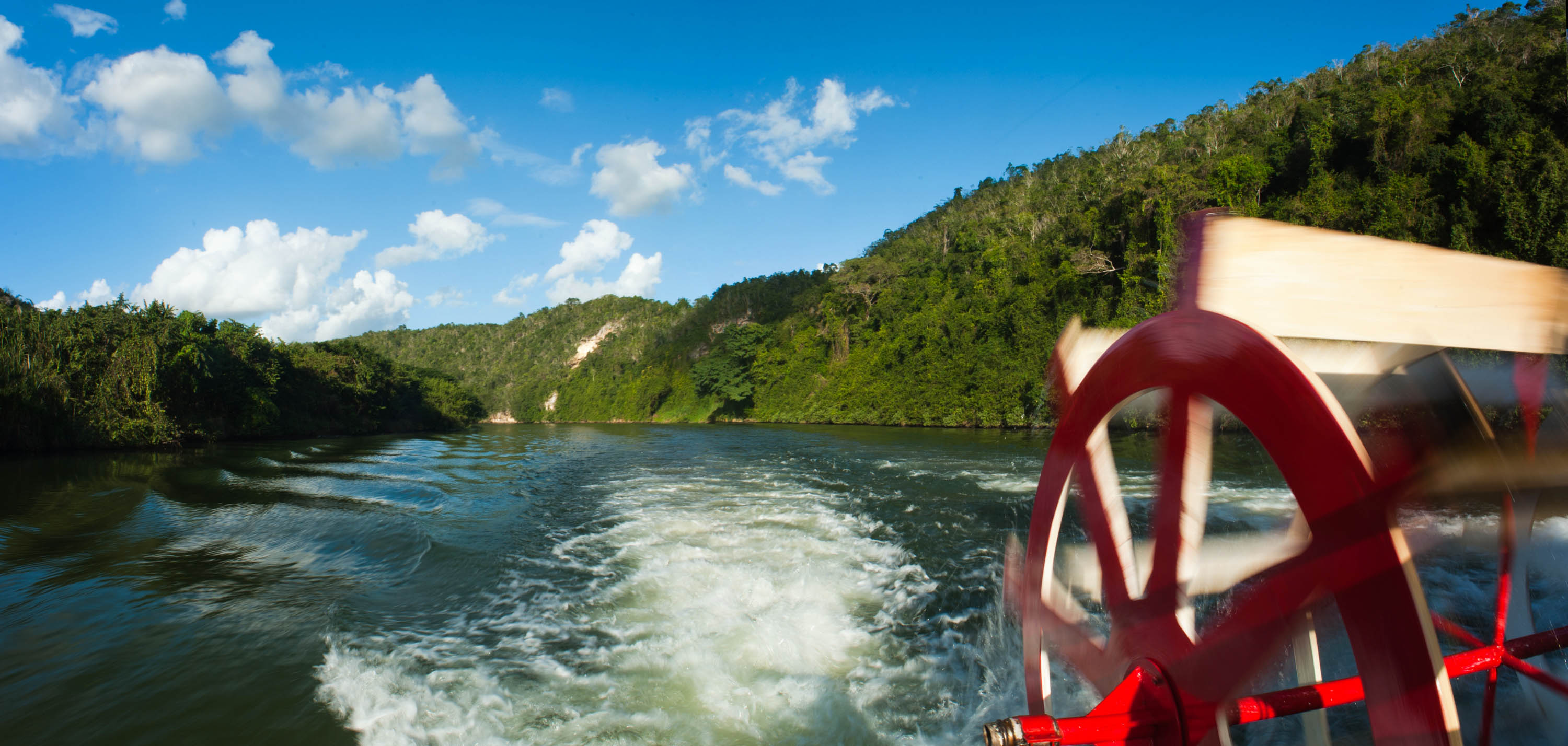
Chavón River

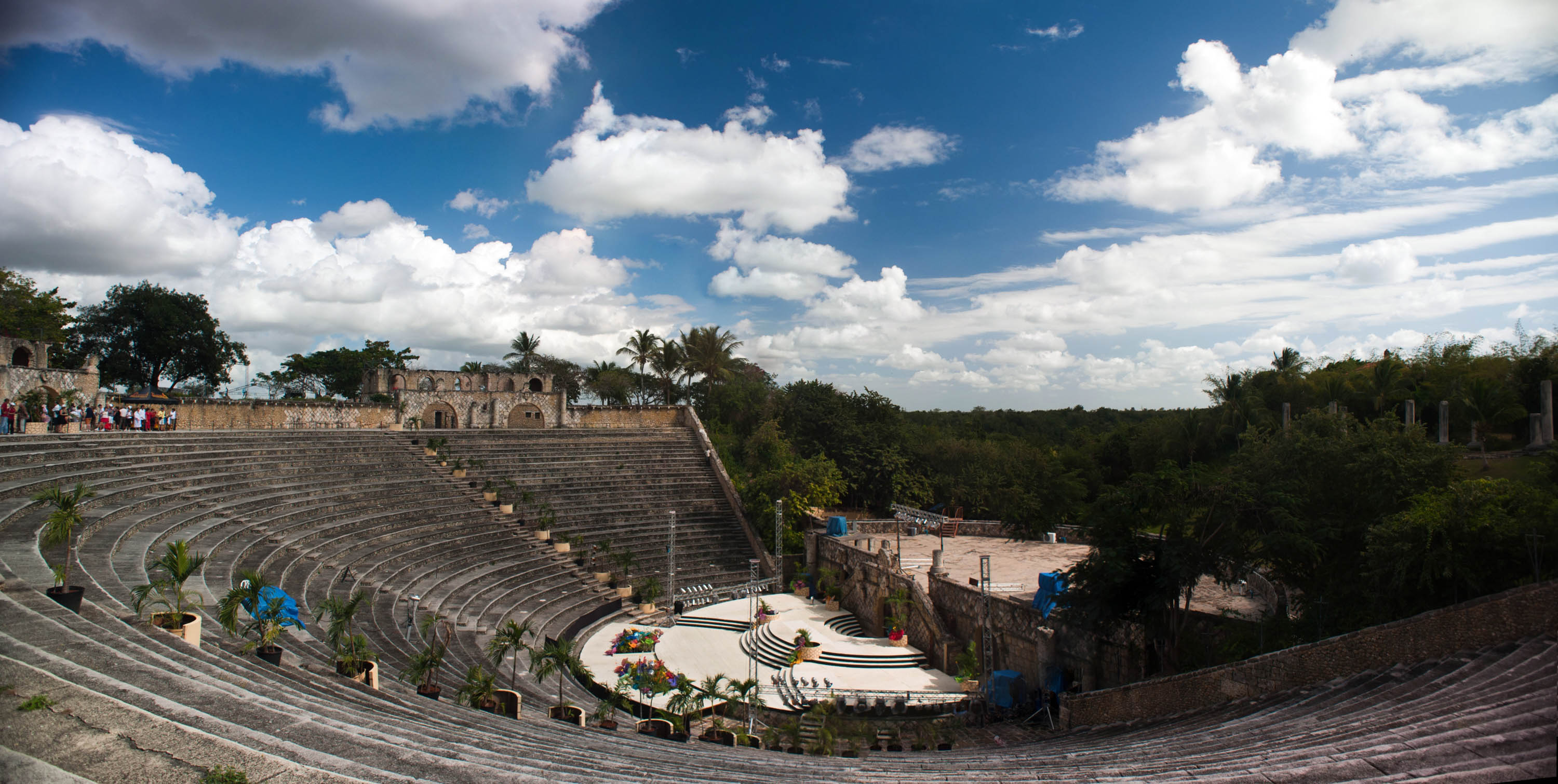
Amphitheater

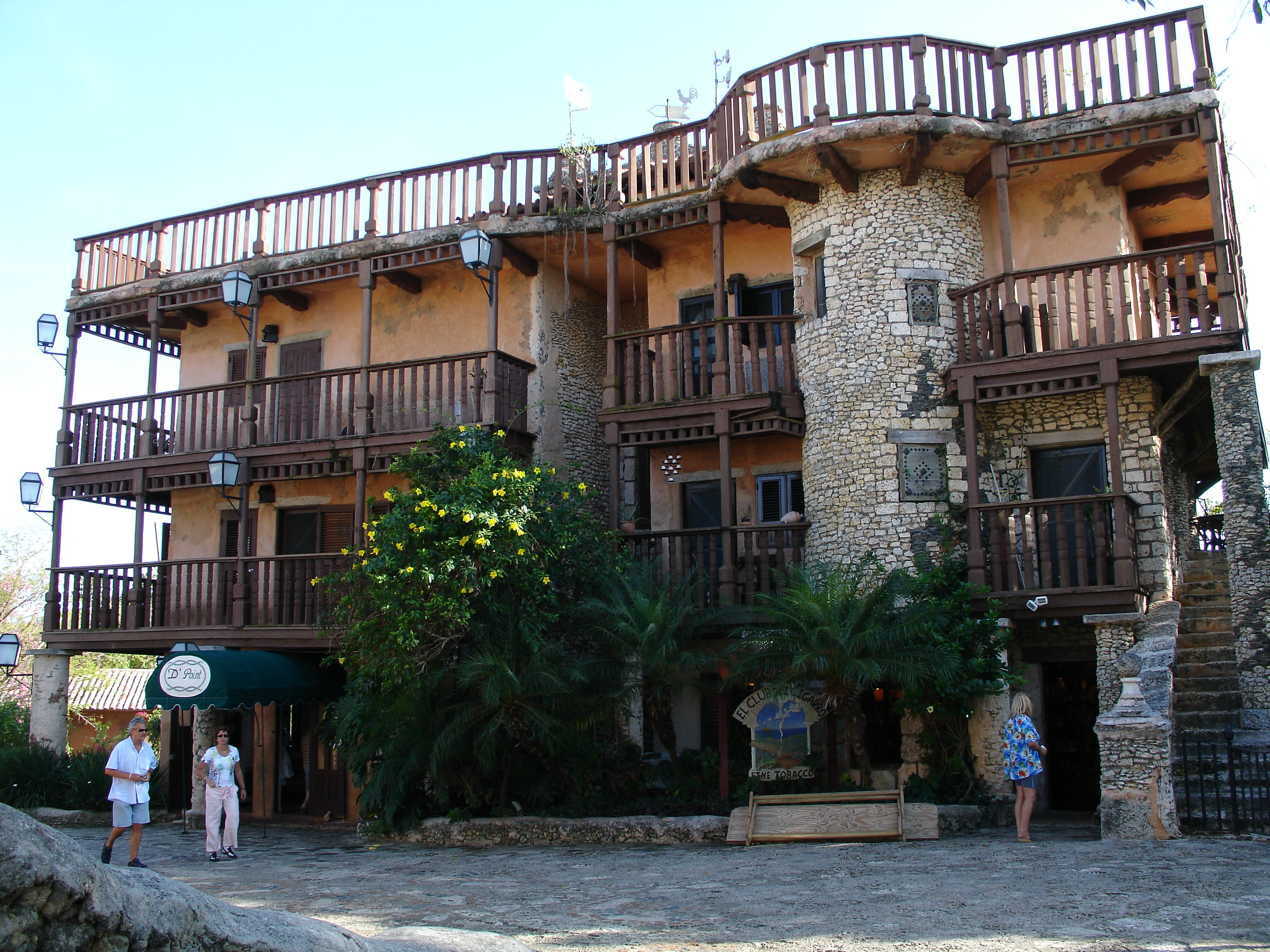
Altos de Chavon

== See also ==
- Casa de Campo
- List of contemporary amphitheaters
