= Chavón River =

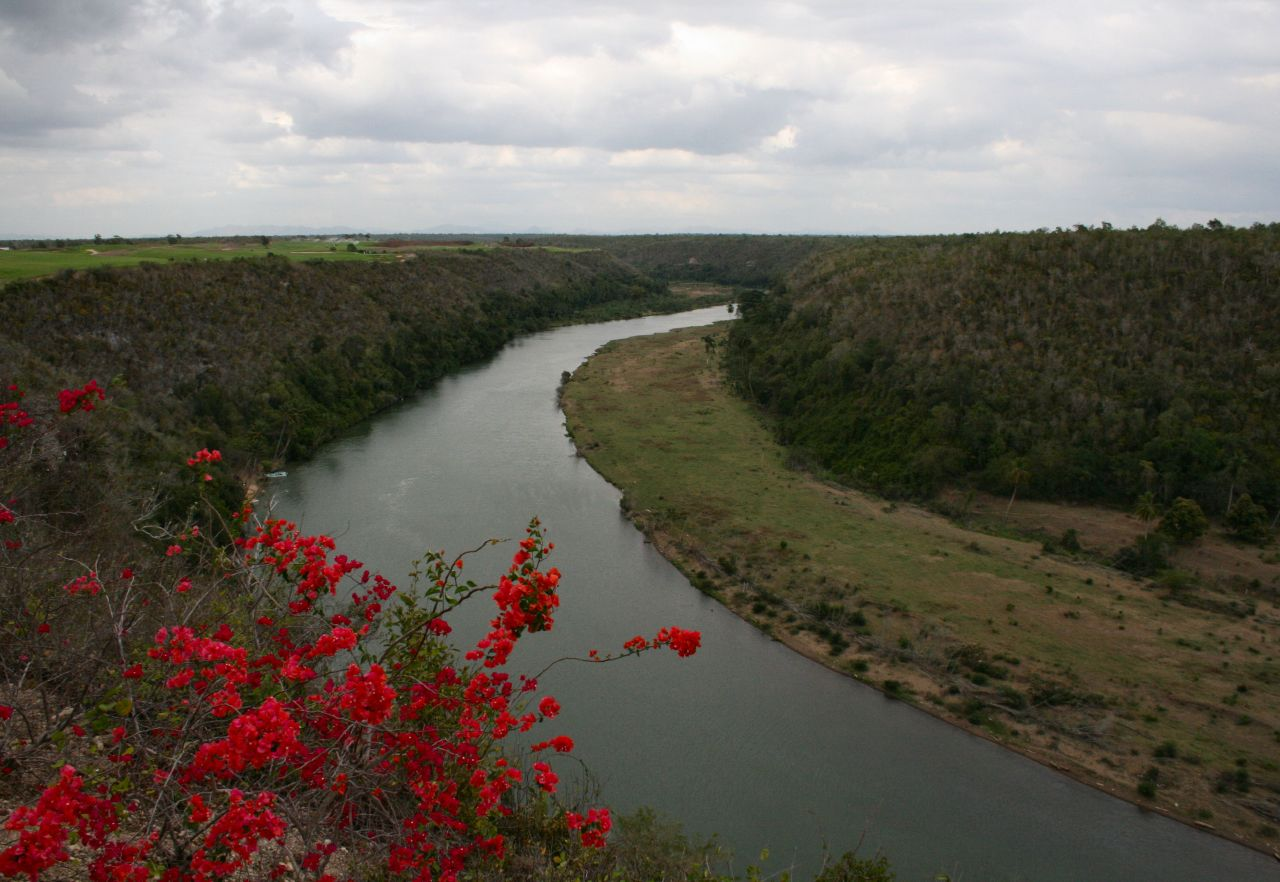
- Chavón River - Altos de Chavón at La Romana, Dominican Republic

- Location of mouth

Location
- Country: Dominican Republic

Physical characteristics
- Mouth
  - coordinates: 18.3989°N 68.8973°W

The Chavón River is a river located to the east of the Dominican Republic. Its best view is obtained from the village called Altos de Chavón. The history of this river contains extremely interesting passages; From the origin of its name, possible corruption of the name Taino "Bomana", until its use by known pirates to hide treasures, passing through its use from colonial times to transport the precious woods that were cut in the forests of its basin. At present the mouth of the river is dominated by the town of Altos de Chavón and at its exit is located the spectacular marina of Casa de Campo. After the dam of the river located on the bridge that crosses it we find a tropical space that can be visited in pleasant ships that transport tourists who want to enjoy the calm waters. It is a fairly large river that is born in the interior of the country to flow into the Caribbean Sea on the outskirts of the city of La Romana.

== See also ==
- List of rivers of the Dominican Republic
