= Architecture in Puerto Rico =

Architecture in Puerto Rico demonstrates a broad variety of styles, trends and forms over the history of the archipelago over four centuries of Spanish rule, and over a century of American rule. Puerto Rican architecture is as diverse as its multicultural society, and has been shaped by many internal and external factors and regional distinctions. Beginning with the early encounter between the indigenous Taino and Spanish colonizers in the last decade of the 15th century, throughout its history Puerto Rico has witnessed both the applications of European and American styles of architecture and the development of local vernacular styles that today form a part of the Puerto Rican society and identity.

== Pre-Columbian ==
When the Spanish first arrived in Puerto Rico in 1493, they noted that the native Taino architectural structures, made primarily of wood and straw, were susceptible to decay. Subsequently, among other aspects of their society, the Taino were viewed as naive and inferior. Taino villages (yucayeques) were arranged in a circular fashion around a courtyard (batey) with huts (bohíos) and larger family longhouses (caneyes) built around it. Although the Spanish used stone building and functional room division within their structures, in the early days of the Spanish settlement of Puerto Rico they also mimicked Taino techniques and styles using wooden posts, walls and roofs for their cottages.

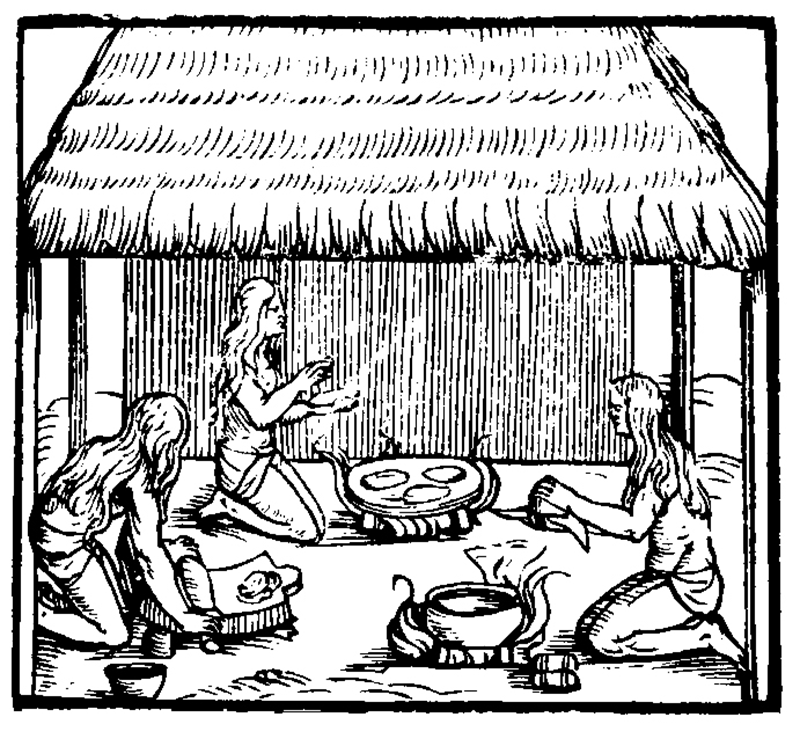
1565 Spanish depiction of a group of women preparing cassava bread in a longhouse (caney)

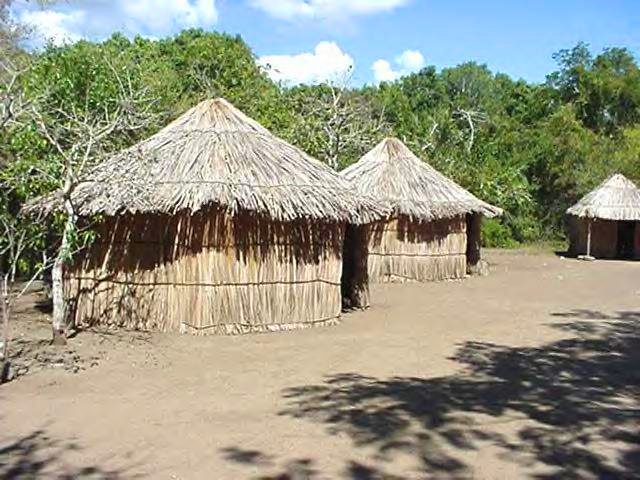
Traditional hut (bohío) reconstruction at the Tibes Indigenous Ceremonial Center in Ponce

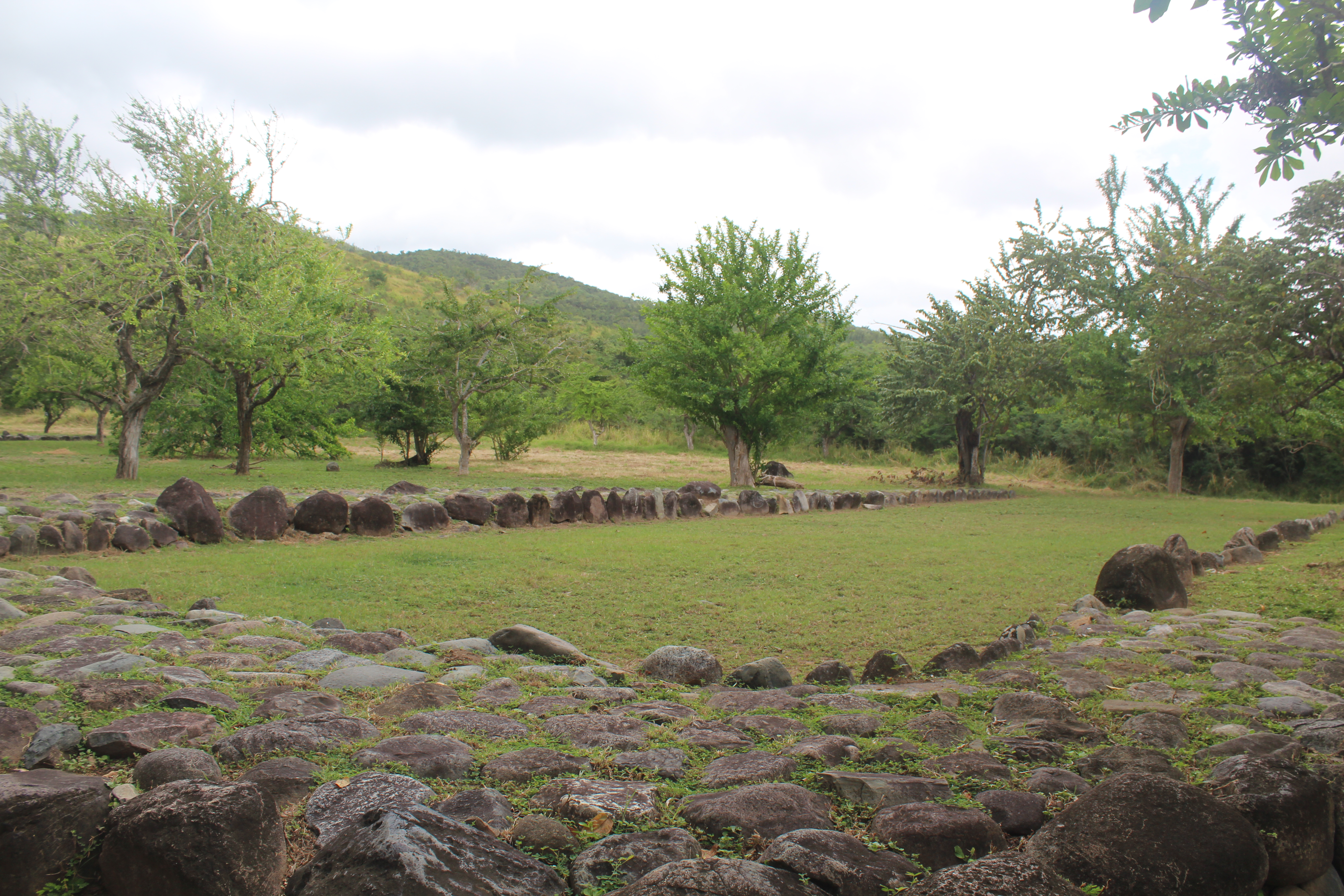
Ball court (batey) in the Tibes Indigenous Ceremonial Center

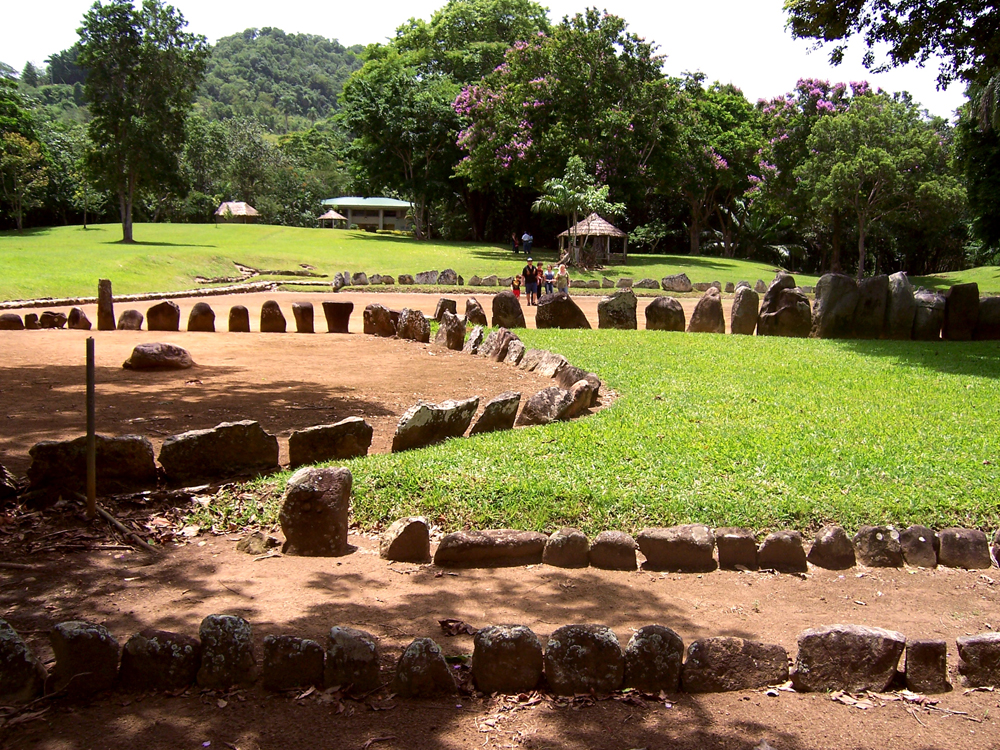
Ball court (batey) in Caguana Indigenous Ceremonial Center in Utuado

== Spanish colonization (16th–18th centuries) ==
The Spanish conquest and colonization of Puerto Rico naturally imported the engineering practices and architectural styles that became the building blocks of the development of a Puerto Rican architecture. The island climate as well as the geographical military strategy were both taken heavily into account when building structures during the early periods of the Spanish settlement of Puerto Rico. In order to keep buildings safe, they were often built within the confines of strong outer stone walls. Inn order to fit all these buildings of various religious, military, and administrative functions, colonial buildings tended to be narrowly built at the time. These buildings were often constructed with a central courtyard in order to allow for natural lightning and ventilation. Colonial architecture in Puerto Rico, particularly the earliest iterations of vernacular styles, takes substantial inspiration from the architecture of Andalusia as many early settlers of the island came from that Spanish region.

=== Military architecture ===
The city of San Juan, officially founded in 1521 as Puerto Rico de San Juan Bautista, quickly grew in military importance due to its large and safe natural harbor and for its strategic location in the north coast of the island. San Juan during this time grew to become an important stopover between Europe and the Americas and, for this reason, was often the target of maritime attacks from both pirate and rival European powers. For this purpose, the entirety of the colonial city was fortified with a citywide wall and numerous fortresses, bastions and batteries, virtually turning the city into one of the largest and most impenetrable Spanish military complexes in the world at the time, incorporating both utilitarian and decorative styles informed by previous Gothic and Renaissance trends, and burgeoning Baroque and Neoclassical styles often used in military construction at the time.

A notable example is Fort San Felipe del Morro, designed by Battista Antonelli and Giovanni Battista Antonelli, and built in 1539, at first utilizing Medieval fortification trends but later expanded into its current Renaissance and Baroque presentation. This fortress was built at the northwesternmost tip of the San Juan Islet in order to provide protection to the entrance of the San Juan Bay. Another notable feature of the fortification system, Fort San Cristóbal is a bastion fortress with heavy Vauban influence. This fortification was built in 1634 near the highest natural point of the islet in order fortify its northeastern defense lines and to provide wide projectile commanding view of the bay. La Fortaleza, first built as a rudimentary fortification in 1533 to protect the city from Carib and pirate attacks, was later expanded in the 17th century before being transformed into a Baroque and Neoclassical palatial residence for the governor of Puerto Rico.

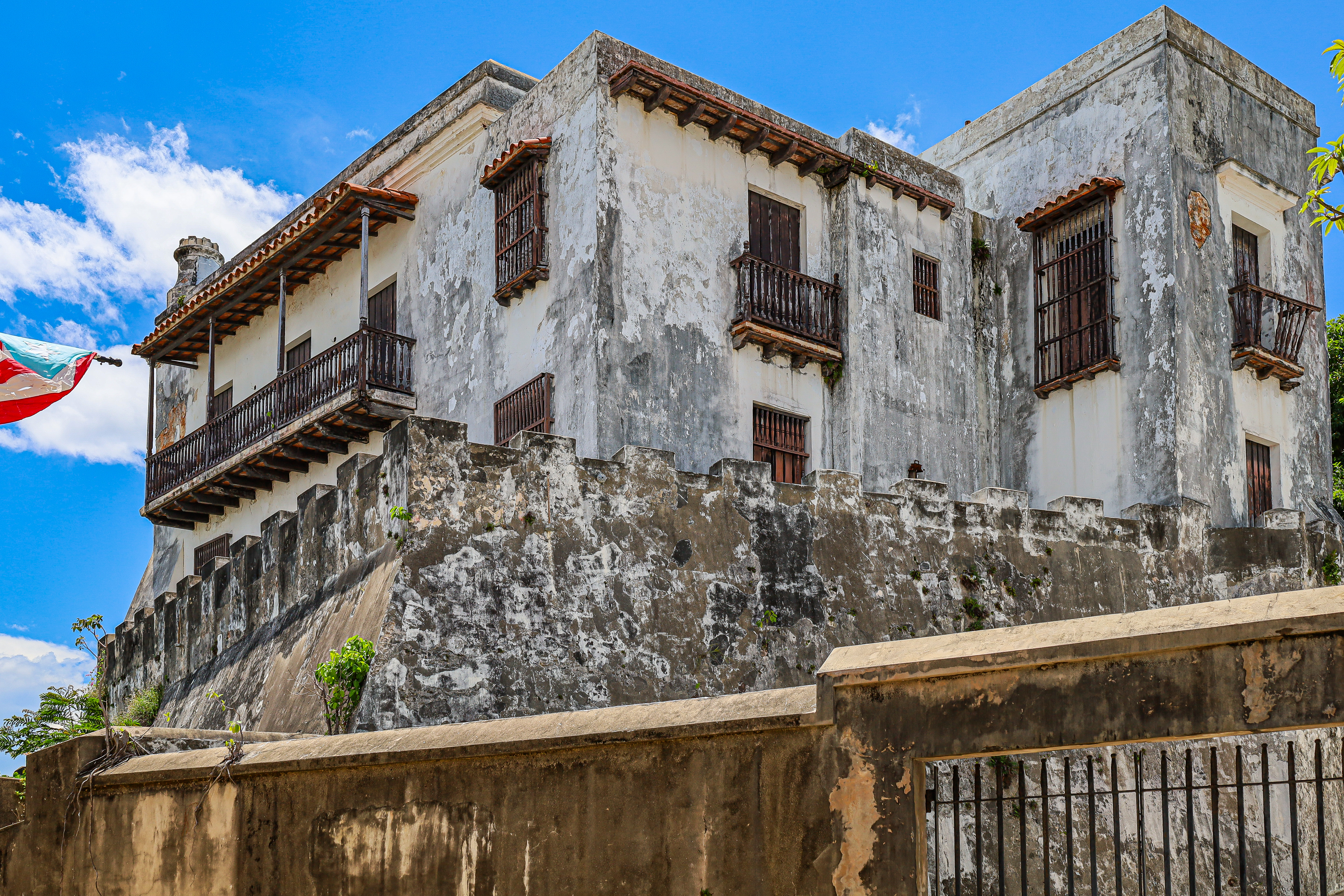
16th-century fortified residence of Juan Ponce de León

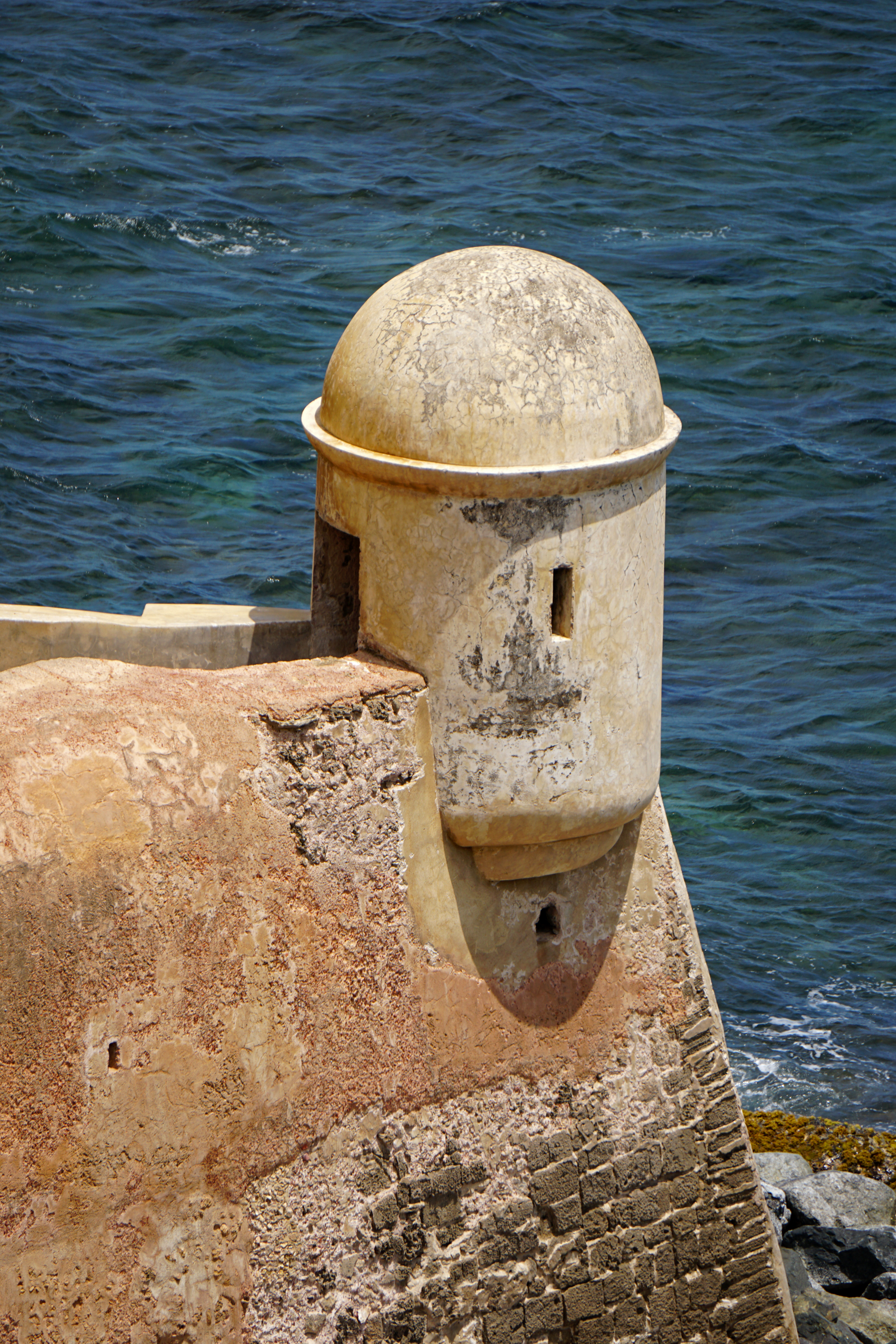
Garita del Diablo, a 16th-century bartizan

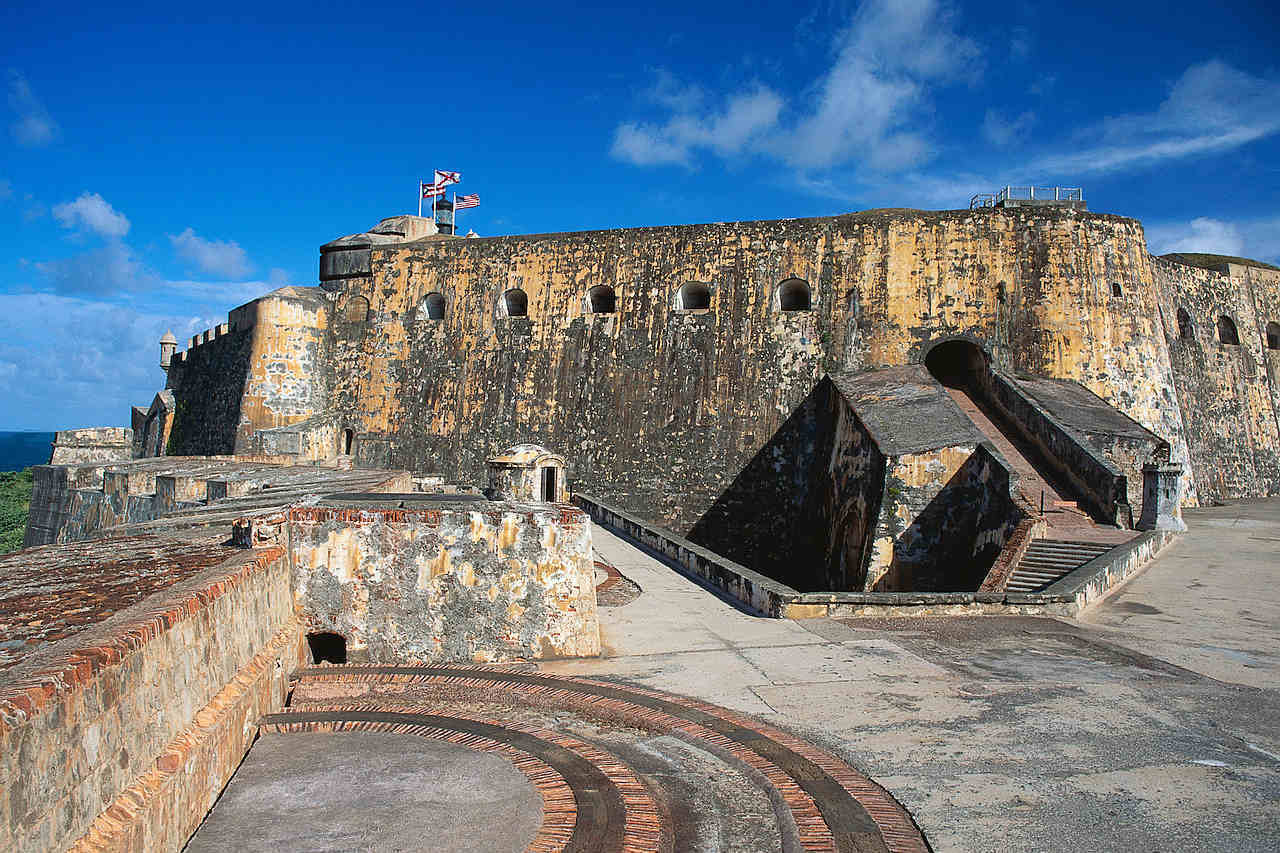
17th century Enlightenment Era citadel of El Morro

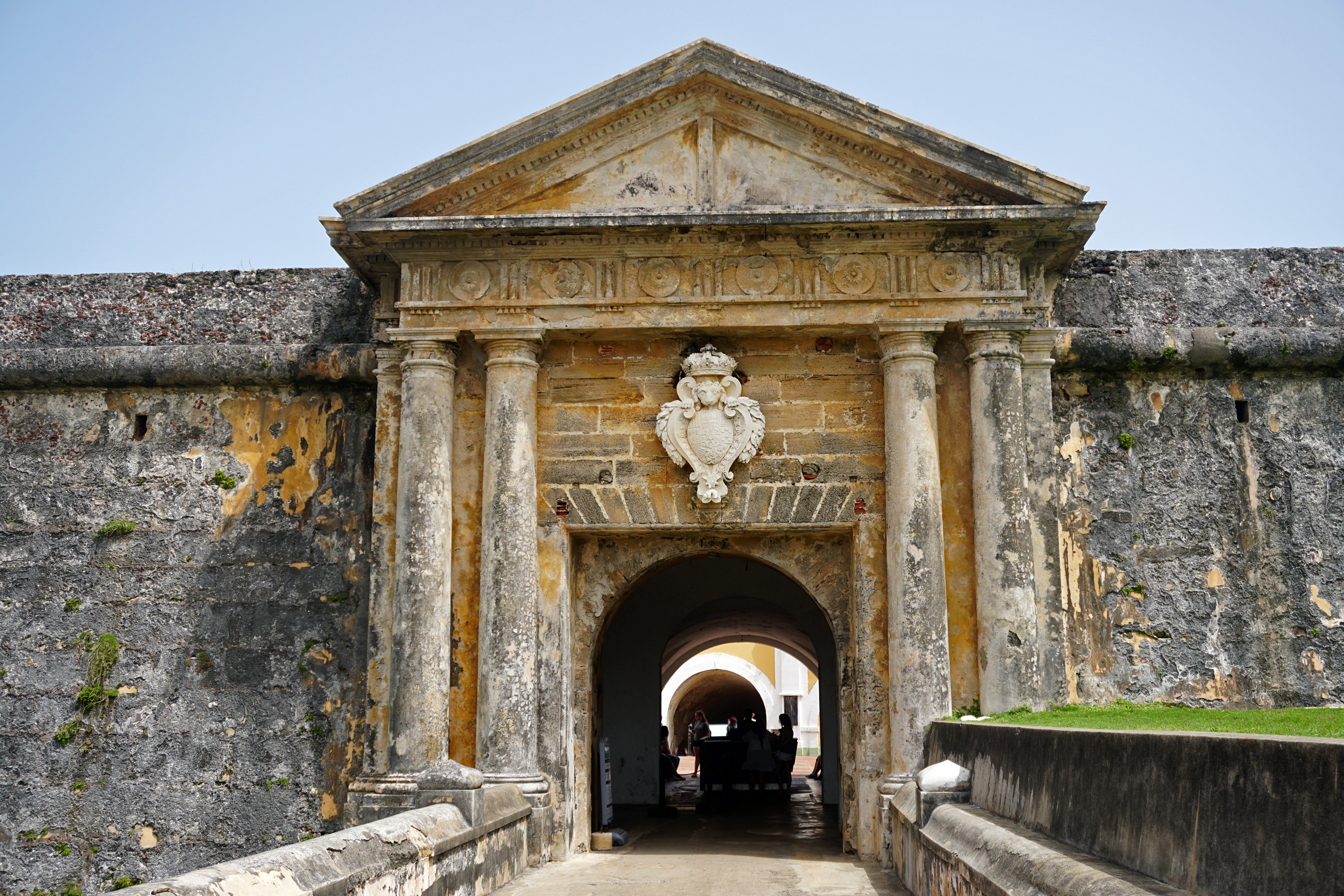
Late 17th-century Baroque main entrance gate of El Morro

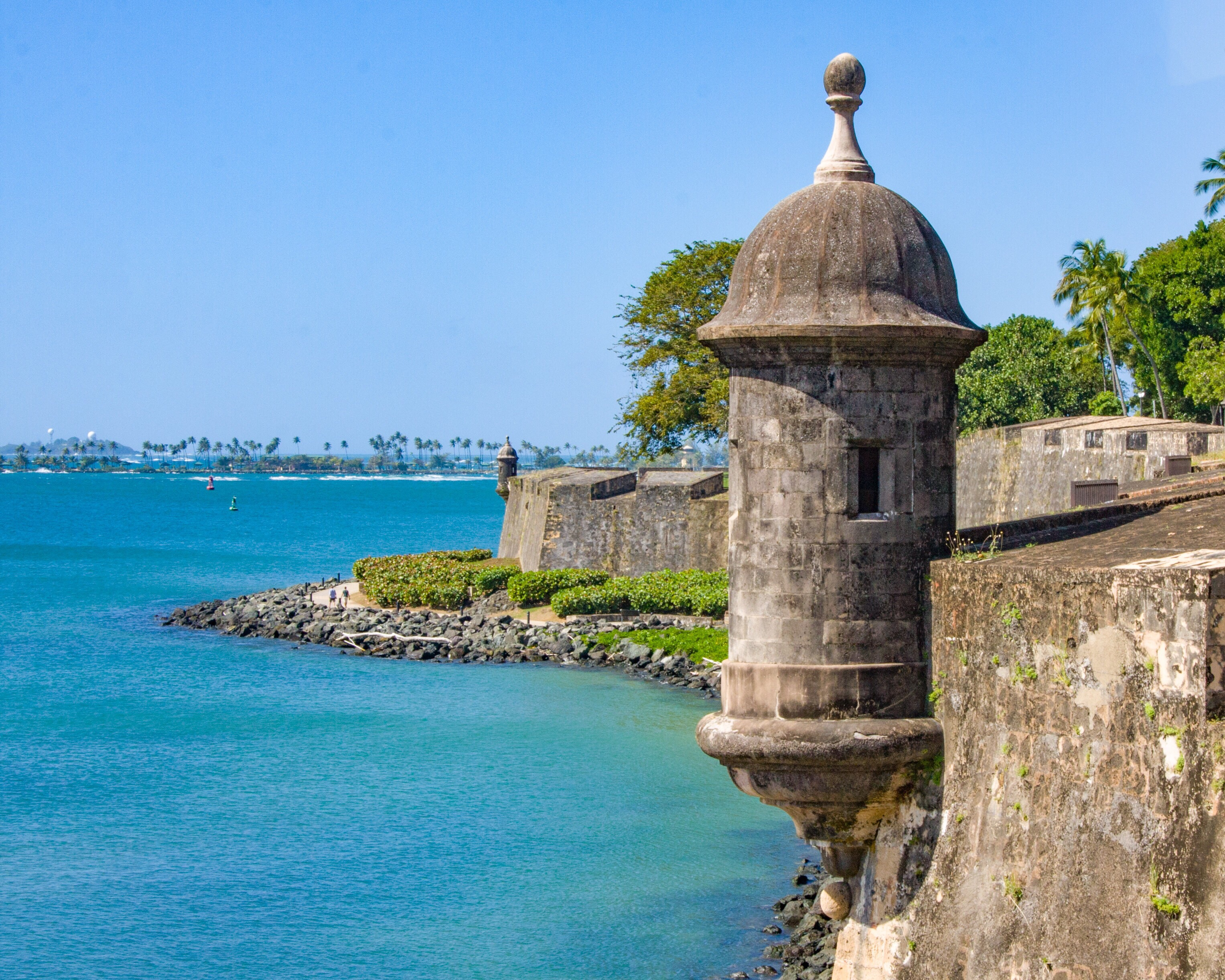
Late 17th-century and early 18th-century walls and garita

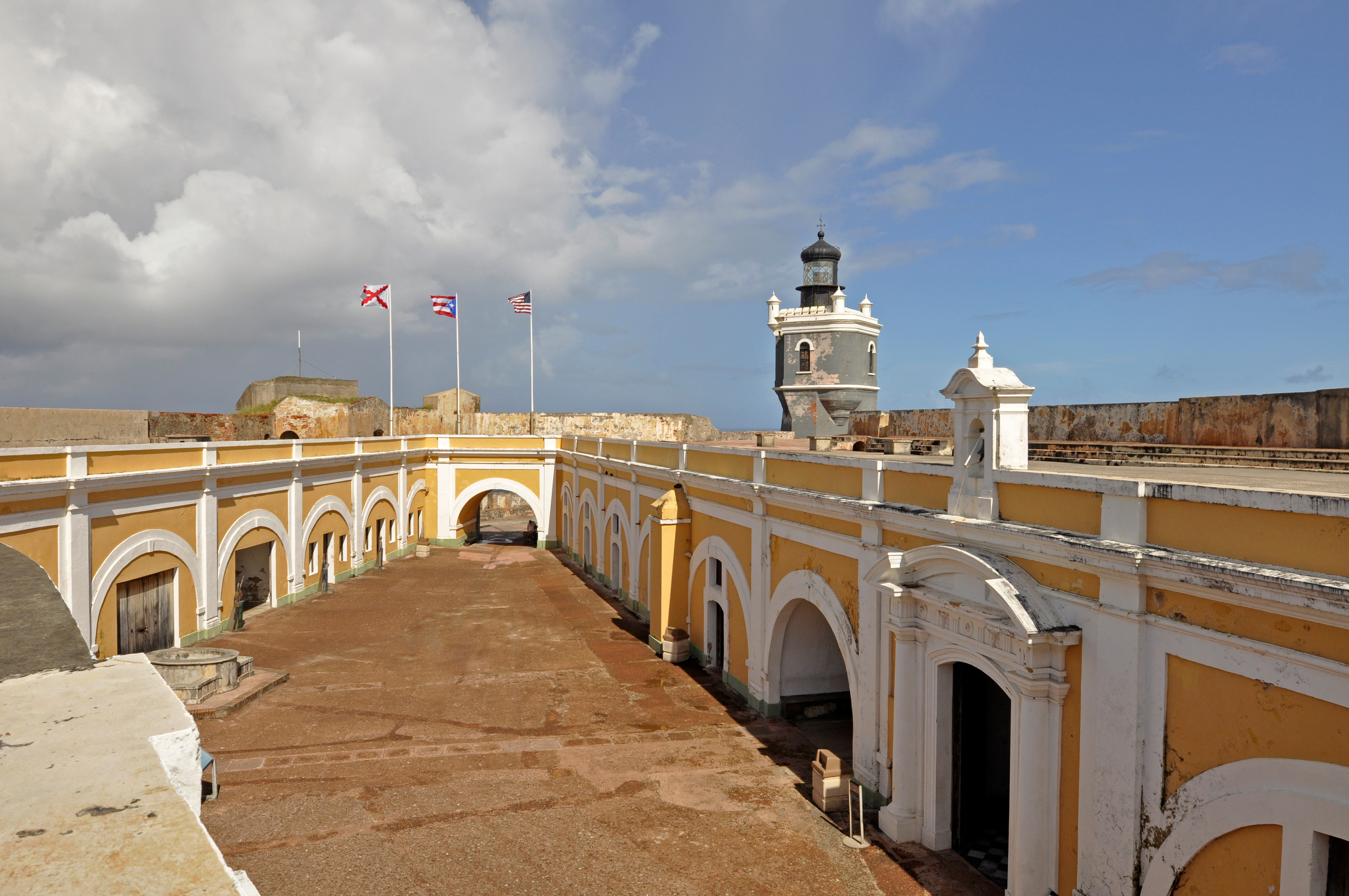
18th-century Baroque Neoclassical courtyard of El Morro

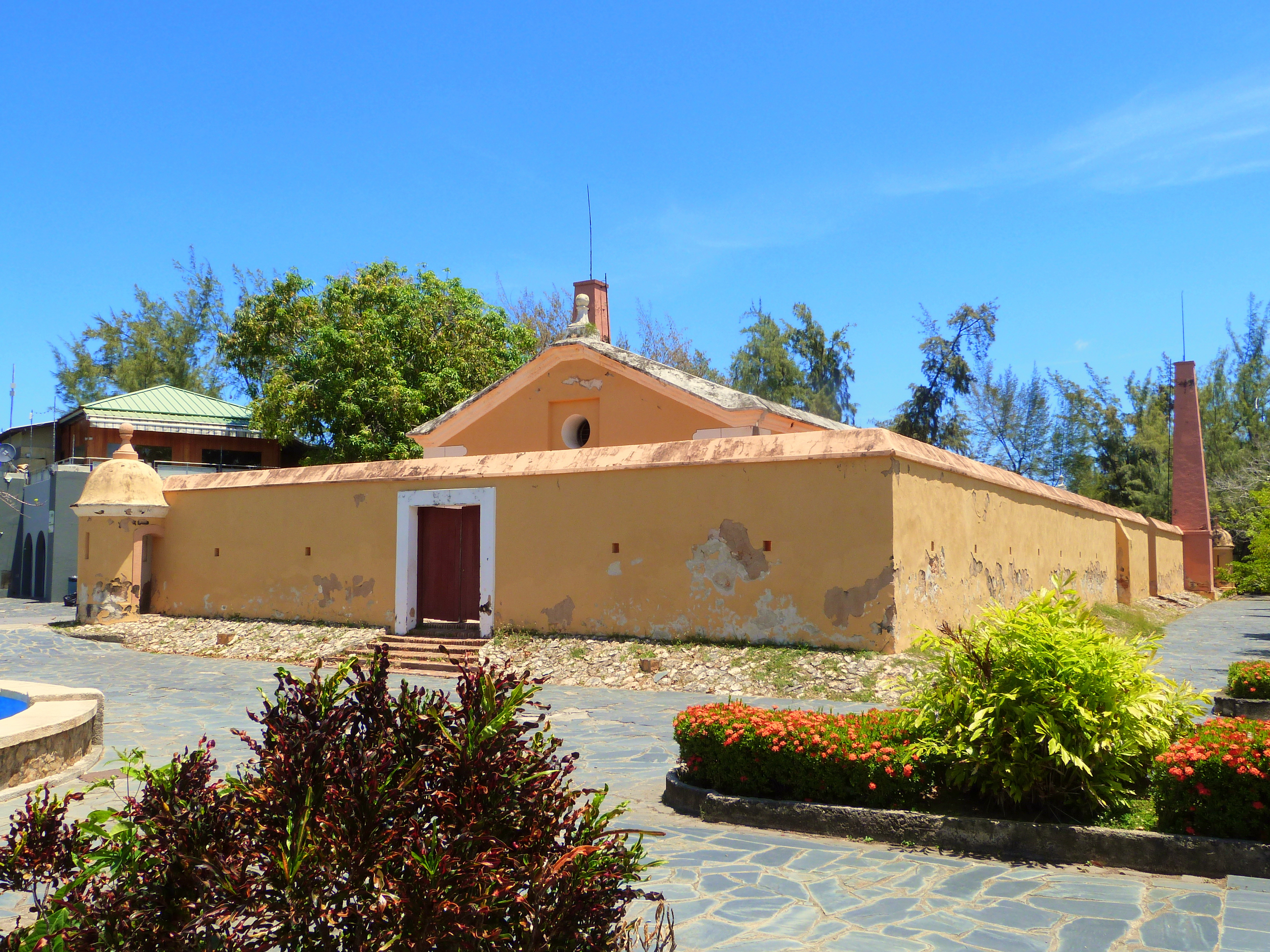
Mid-18th century powder-house in Puerta de Tierra

Spanish fortifications of Puerto Rico erected later in the 19th century were smaller and more utilitarian. These military structures were often multipurpose in function, serving as fortress, barrack and warehouses for the Spanish army in order to defend other coastal cities around the island. These structures were often laid out around a main courtyard and, beginning in the 18th century, incorporated heavy use of Neoclassical styles that were often also utilized in Spanish civic and government buildings across the Caribbean. Examples of these fortresses include Fort San José (1758) in Ponce, the Conde de Mirasol Fortress (1845) in Vieques, Fort of La Concepción (1880) in Aguadilla, and El Castillo (1894) in Ponce. An exception to this trend, in San Juan, the Ballajá Barracks were a larger iteration of this type of structure. Built in 1864, it was the last large military construction project to be erected by the Spanish government before the Spanish–American War, and the last Spanish colonial structure to be built in the Americas.

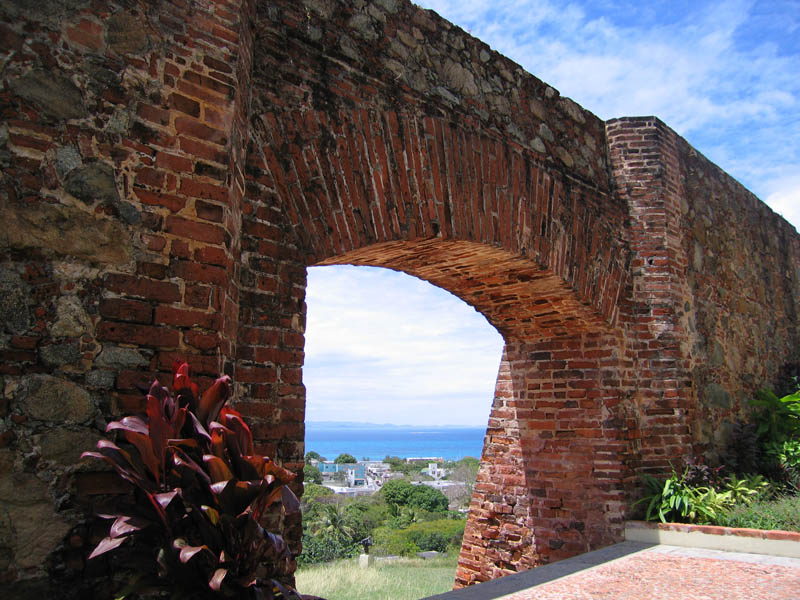
Early 19th century gate of the Vieques Fortress

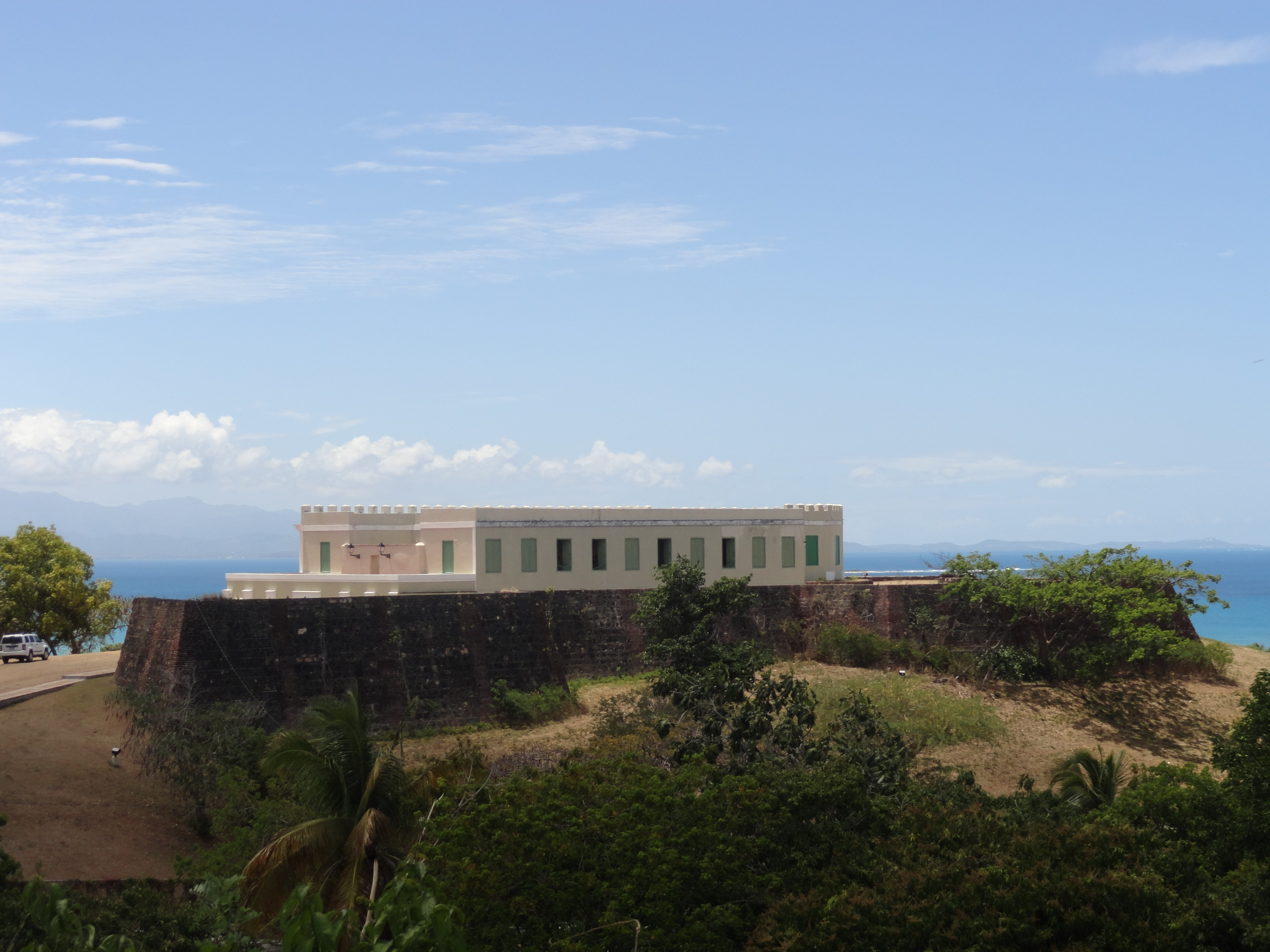
Main citadel of the Vieques Fortress (1845)

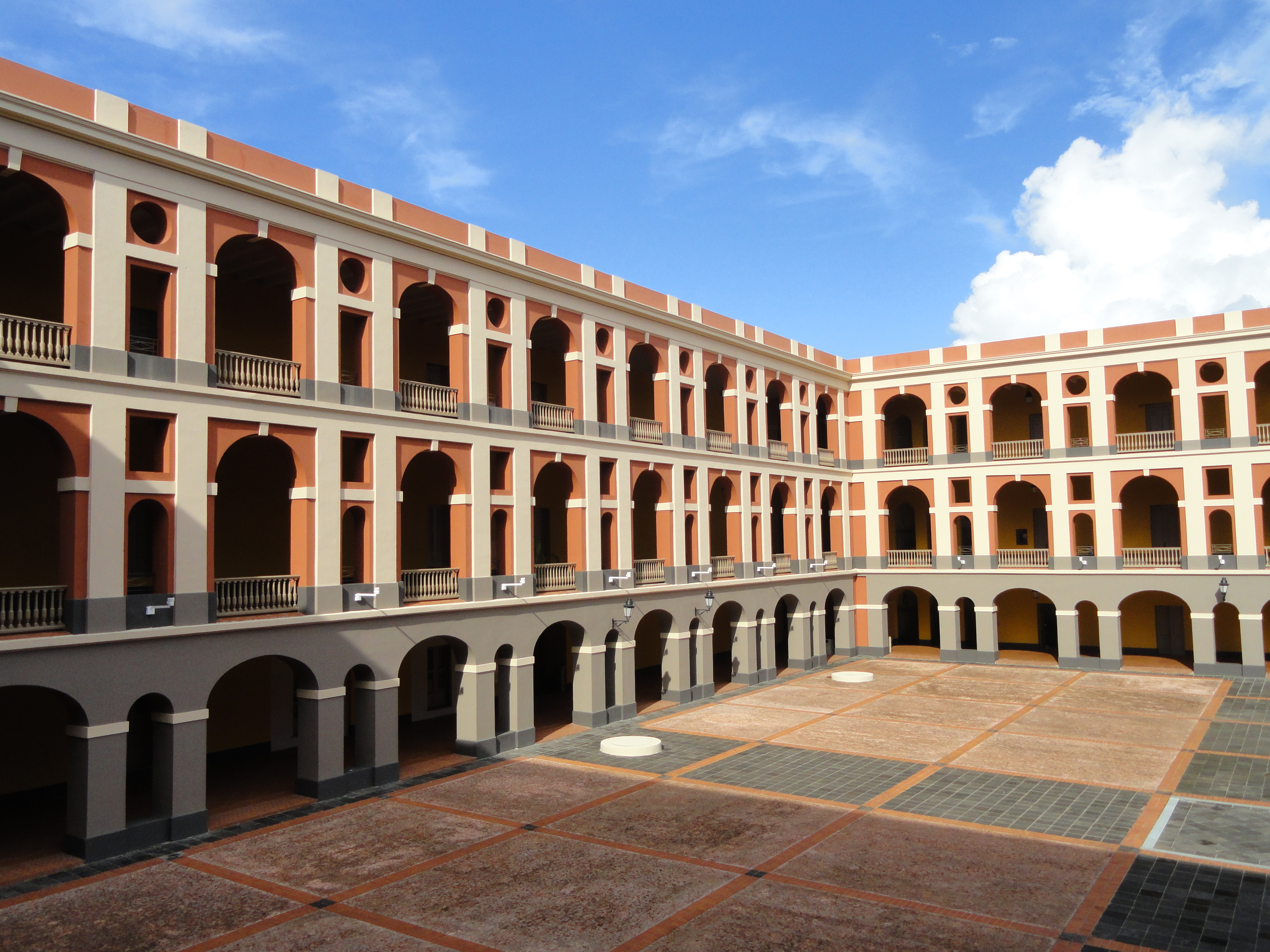
Ballajá Barracks (1864) in Old San Juan

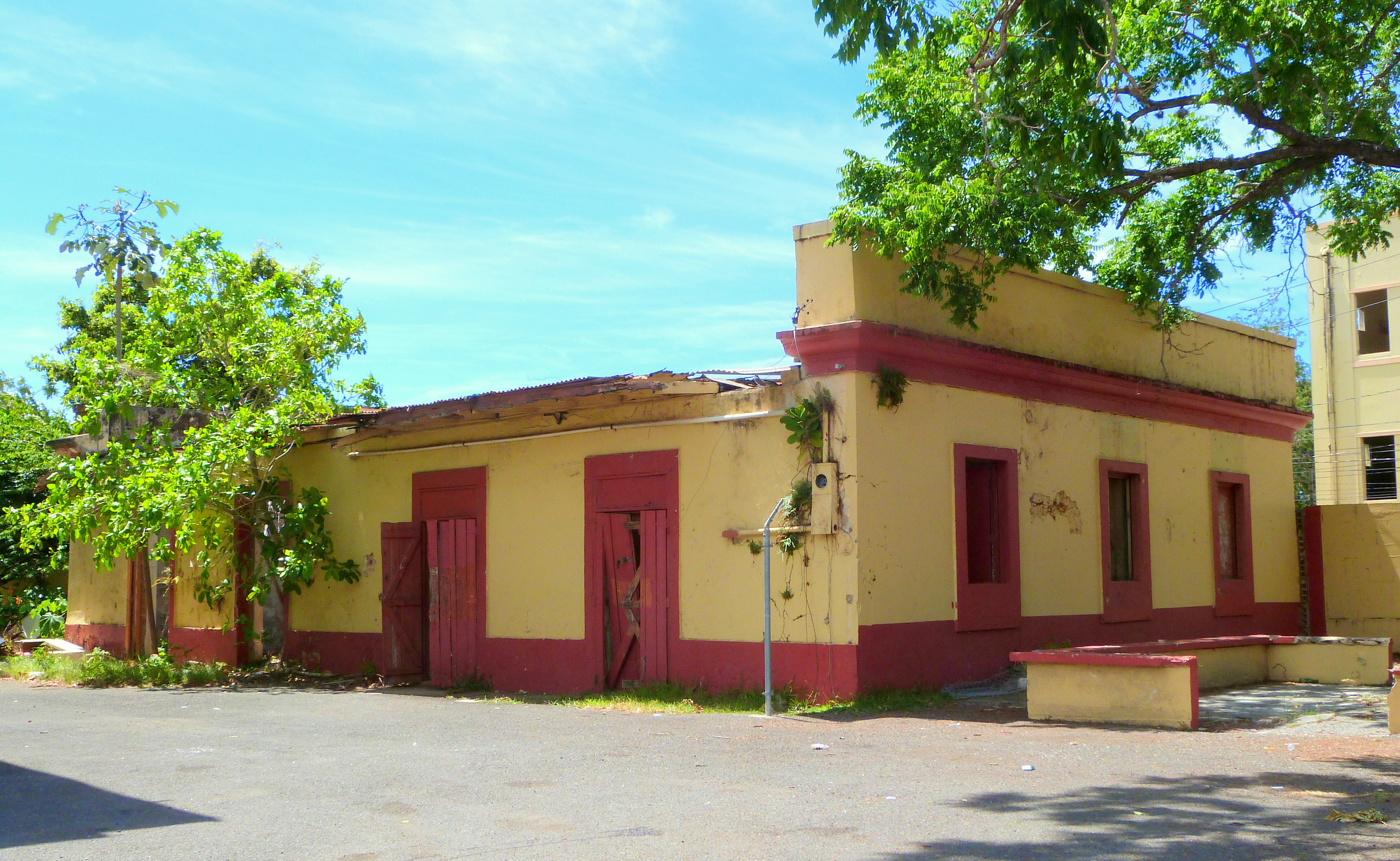
Warehouse of Fort of La Concepción (1884)

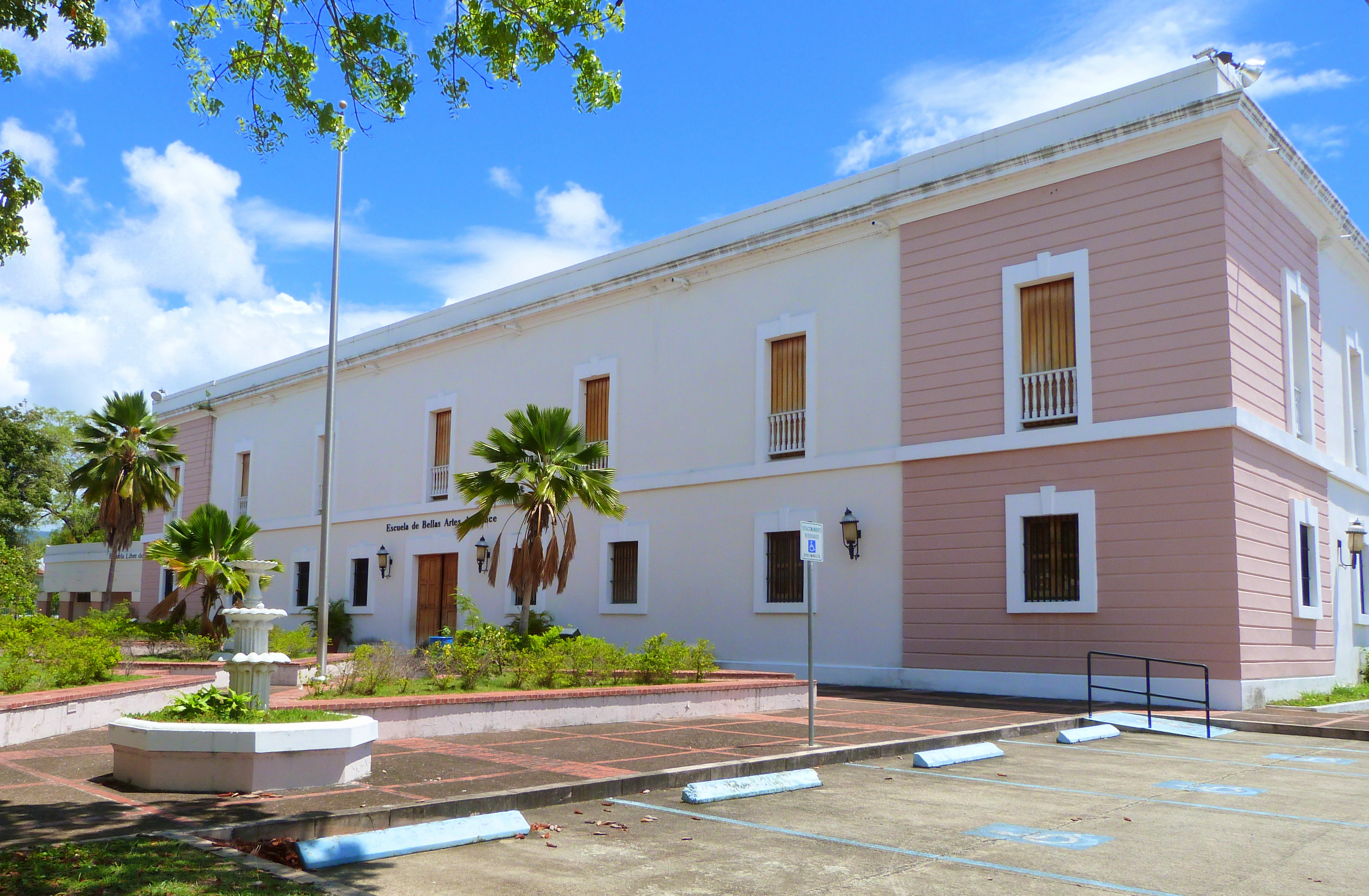
El Castillo (1894) military headquarters in Ponce

=== Religious architecture ===
The San Juan Cathedral and San José Church are the two primary examples of Gothic architecture in Puerto Rico. With high ceilings and vaulted arches being the interior's primary motif, San José Church is one of the few true Gothic structures in Puerto Rico and the Western Hemisphere. The San Juan Cathedral, built in 1540, was one of the largest Gothic churches built in the Americas at the time. Similar to the Cathedral of Santo Domingo (1550) in the Dominican Republic, it possessed a large central nave flanked by vaulted chapels and arcades. The original cathedral was heavily damaged by an earthquake in 1787, prompting its reconstruction in a Baroque style. Although the complete original Gothic structure no longer exists, the present building still preserves several Gothic vaulted chapels. Another example of Gothic religious building in Puerto Rico that no longer exists in its original Gothic style structure include the Church and Convent of Santo Domingo de Porta Coeli in San Germán from 1609.

Gothic churches in San Juan

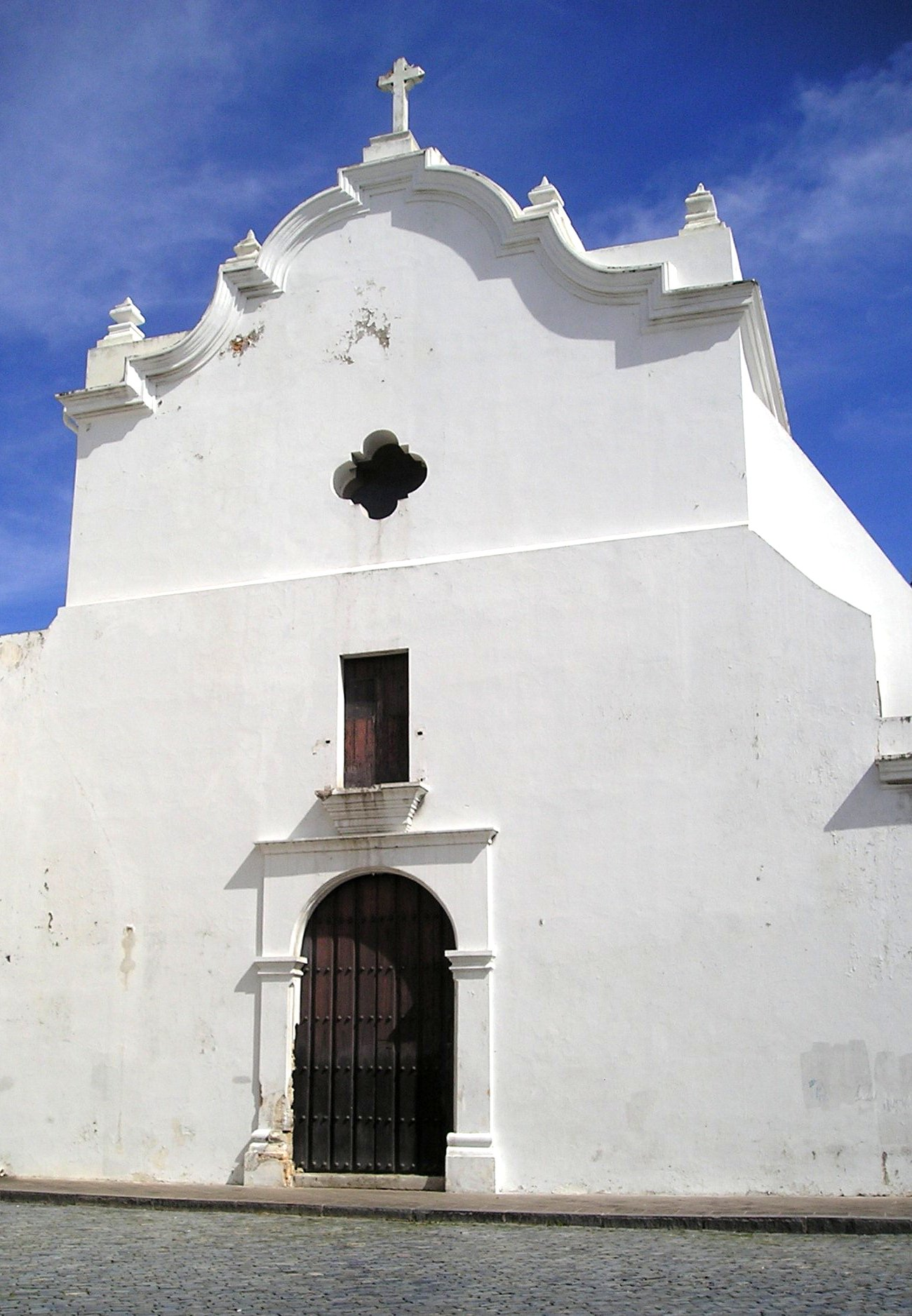
San José Church (1528) façade

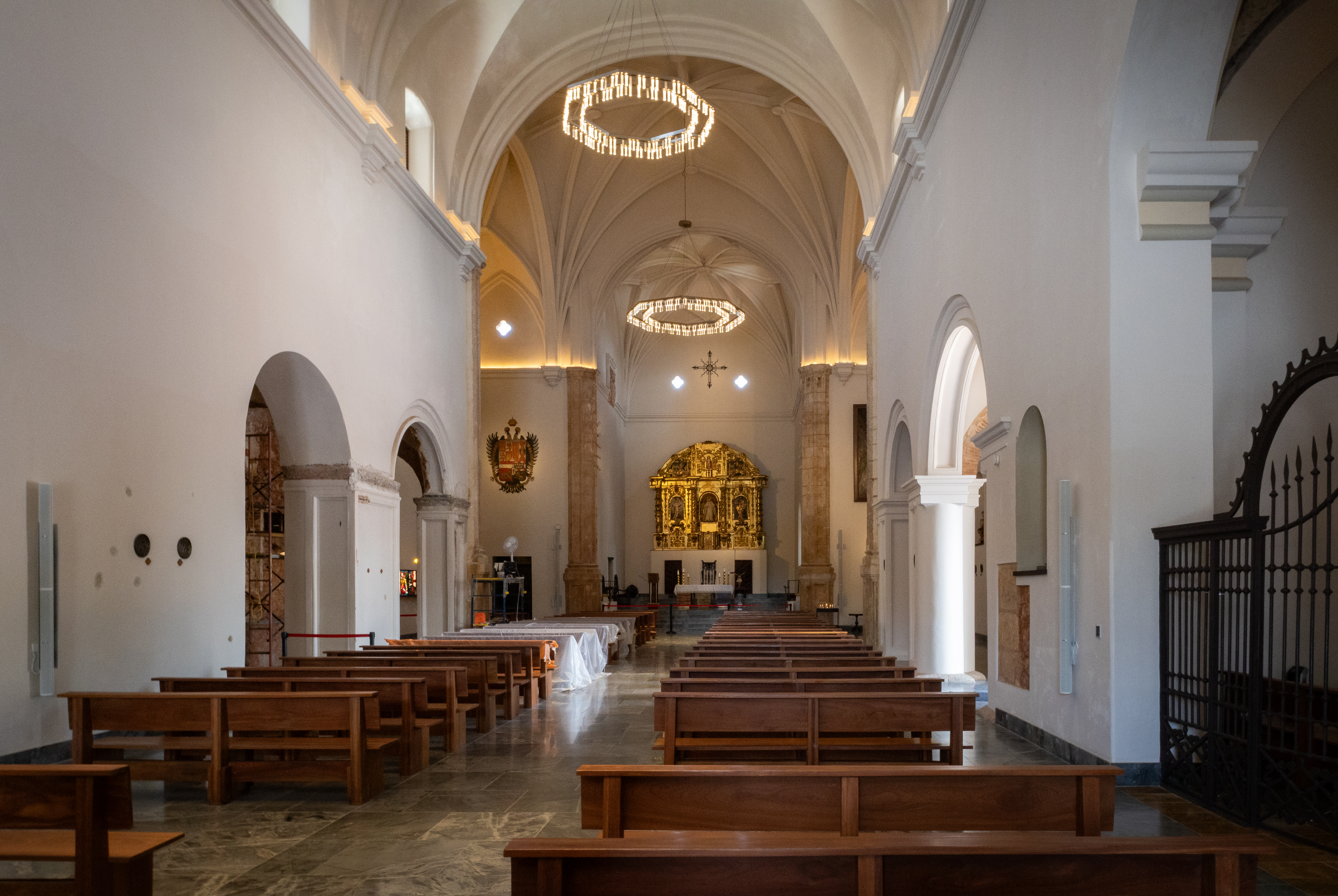
San José Church (1528) vaulted nave after restoration work

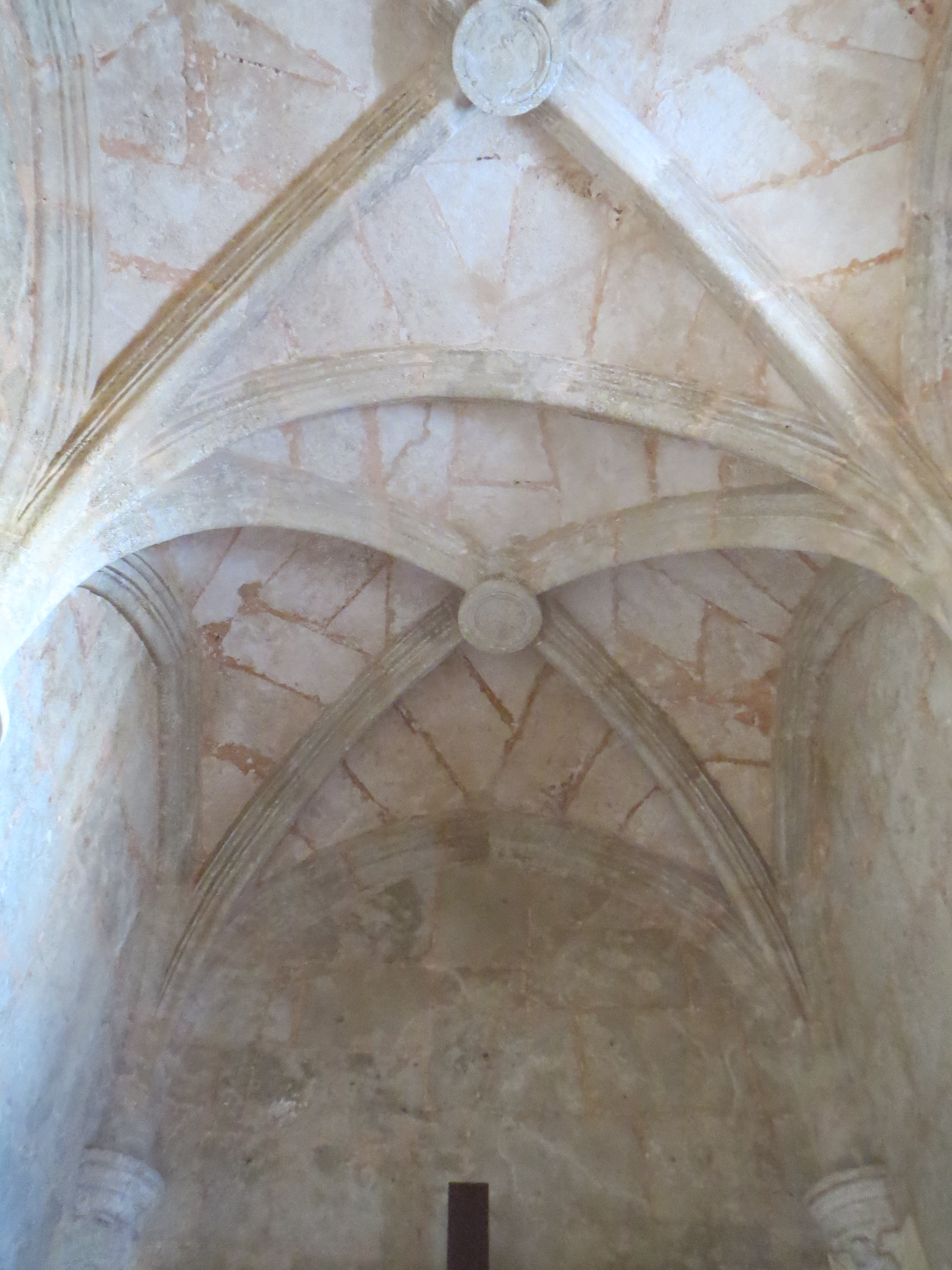
16th-century Gothic vaulted chamber in the Cathedral of San Juan

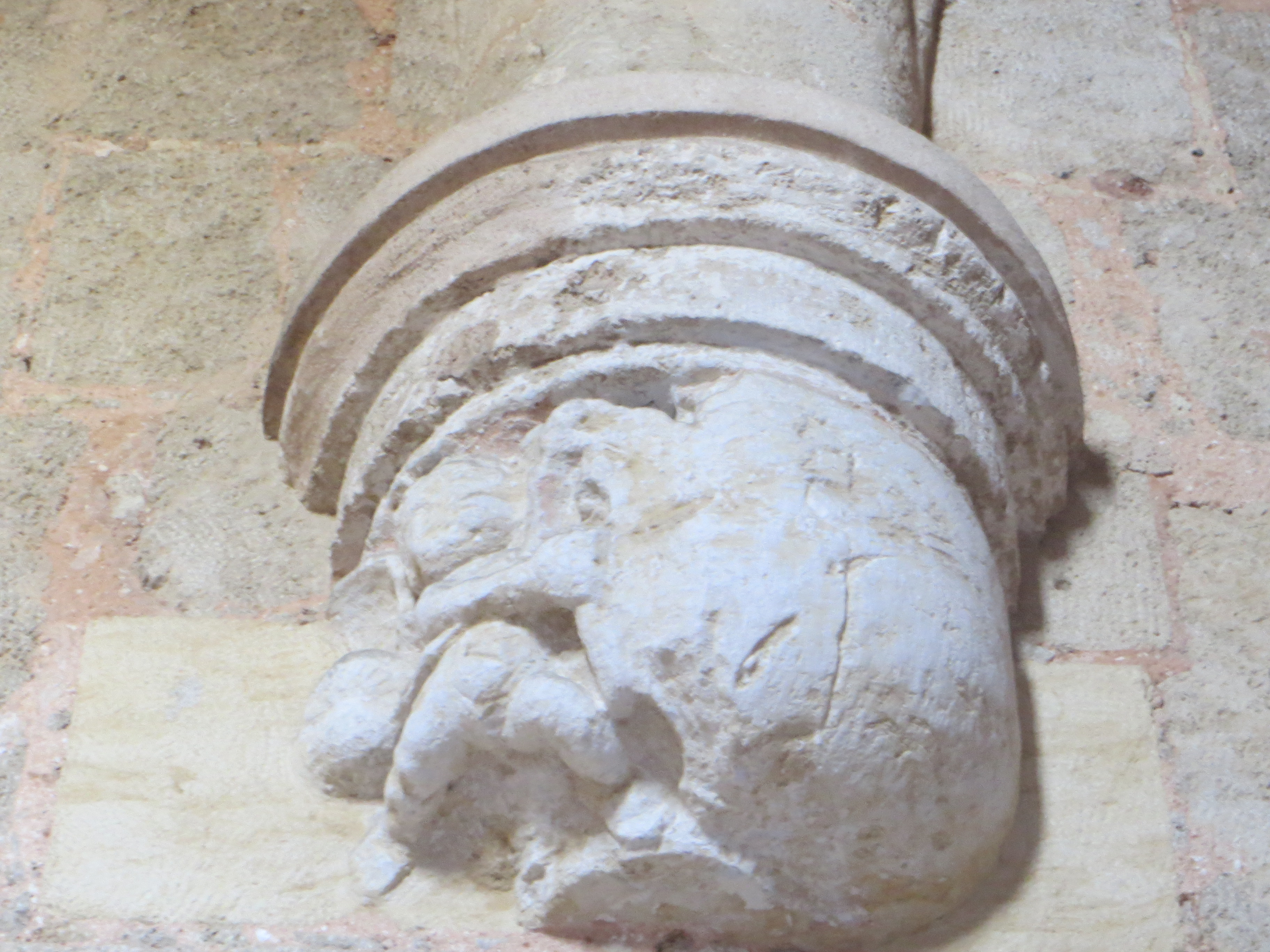
16th-century carved Gothic label stop in the Cathedral of San Juan

With the enactment of the Law of the Indies in 1573, Roman Catholic churches and other religious buildings became an integral part of the urban development of Puerto Rico and the rest of the Spanish colonies in the Americas and Asia. The founding of towns would now be marked by the establishment of a main central square (plaza) flanked by a town hall (alcaldía or cabildo) and the main Roman Catholic church building of the town, either a parish church (parroquia) or cathedral (catedral). Although not as grandiose as those in Mexico, notable Baroque influences in religious structures began to appear in Puerto Rico during the late 17th century. The style was most evident in the curved pediments, Solomonic columns, elaborate retablos, bell-gables (espadañas) and other subtle yet distinctive façade ornamentations. Capilla del Cristo in San Juan, and the Church of San Blas de Illescas, the main parish church of Coamo built in 1661, are notable examples of this trend. Other previously existing churches such as the San Germán de Auxerre Church in San Germán, the Invención de la Santa Cruz Church in Bayamón and the Cathedral of San Juan were also rebuilt following Baroque trends of the previous century. The latter was rebuilt in stages during the last decade of the 18th-century and the first of the 19th-century, and it represents a notable application of some Late Baroque hallmarks (such its trompe-l'œil ornamentations) applied to the now-emerging Spanish Neoclassical styles that would later characterize the Puerto Rican churches of the 19th century.

Baroque churches in Puerto Rico

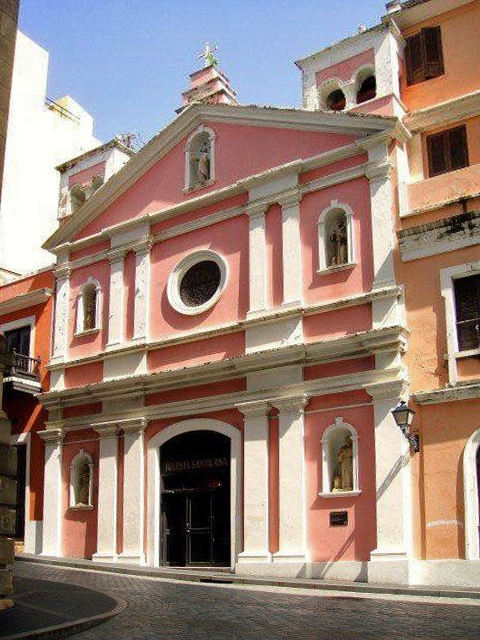
17th-century Santa Ana Church in Old San Juan

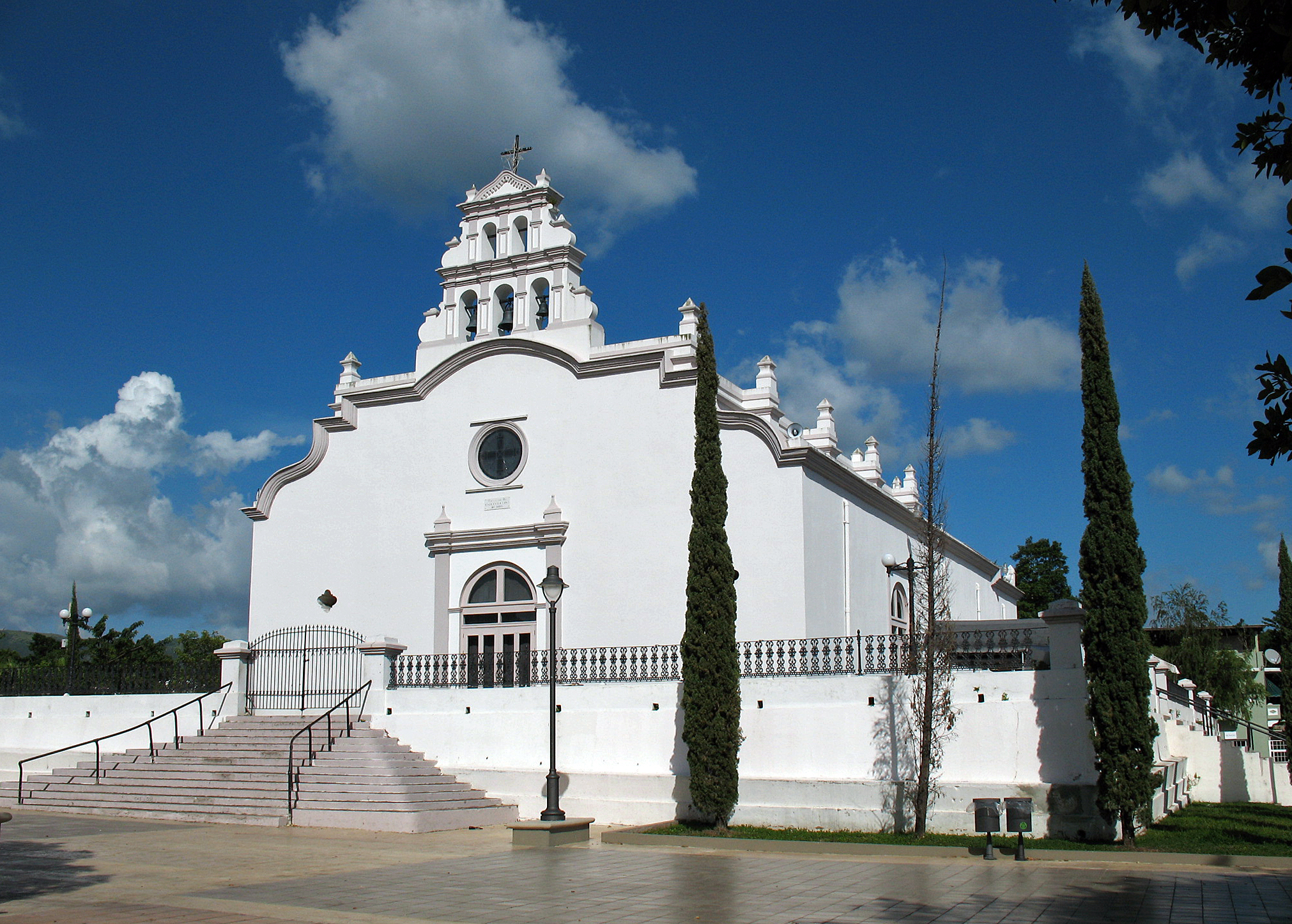
Church San Blas de Illescas (1661) exterior in Coamo

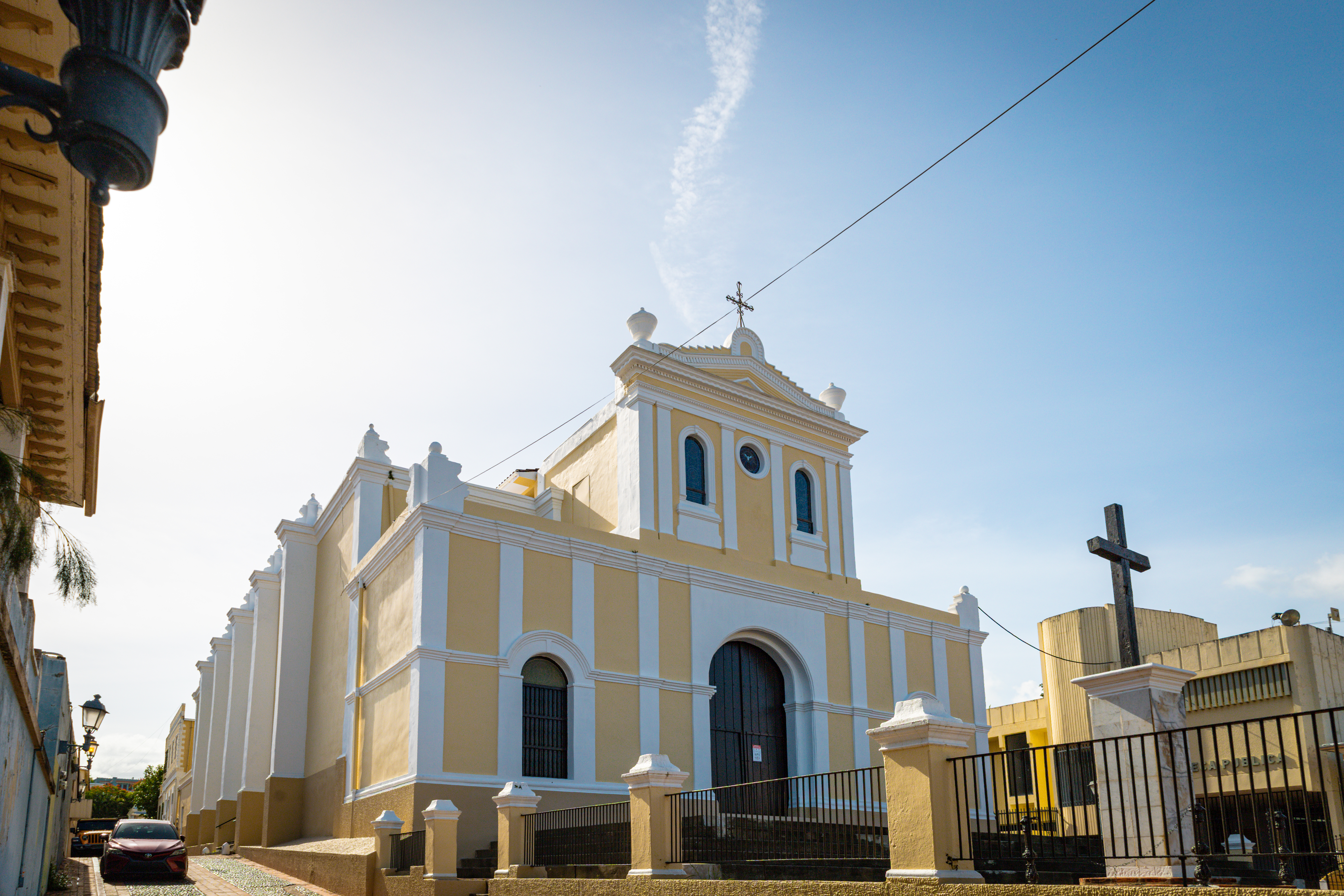
San Germán de Auxerre Church (1688) in San Germán

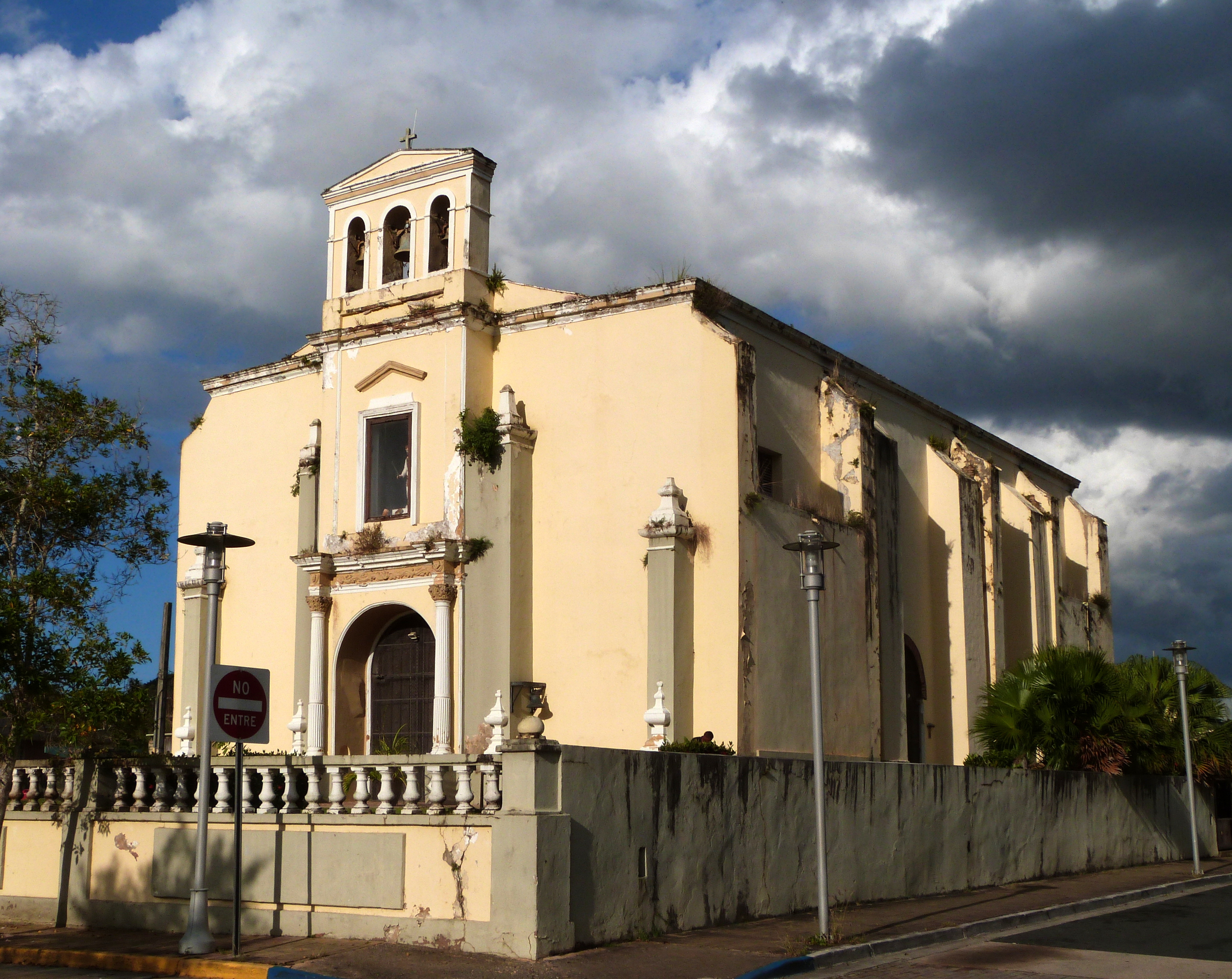
Church of San Fernando (1752) in Toa Alta

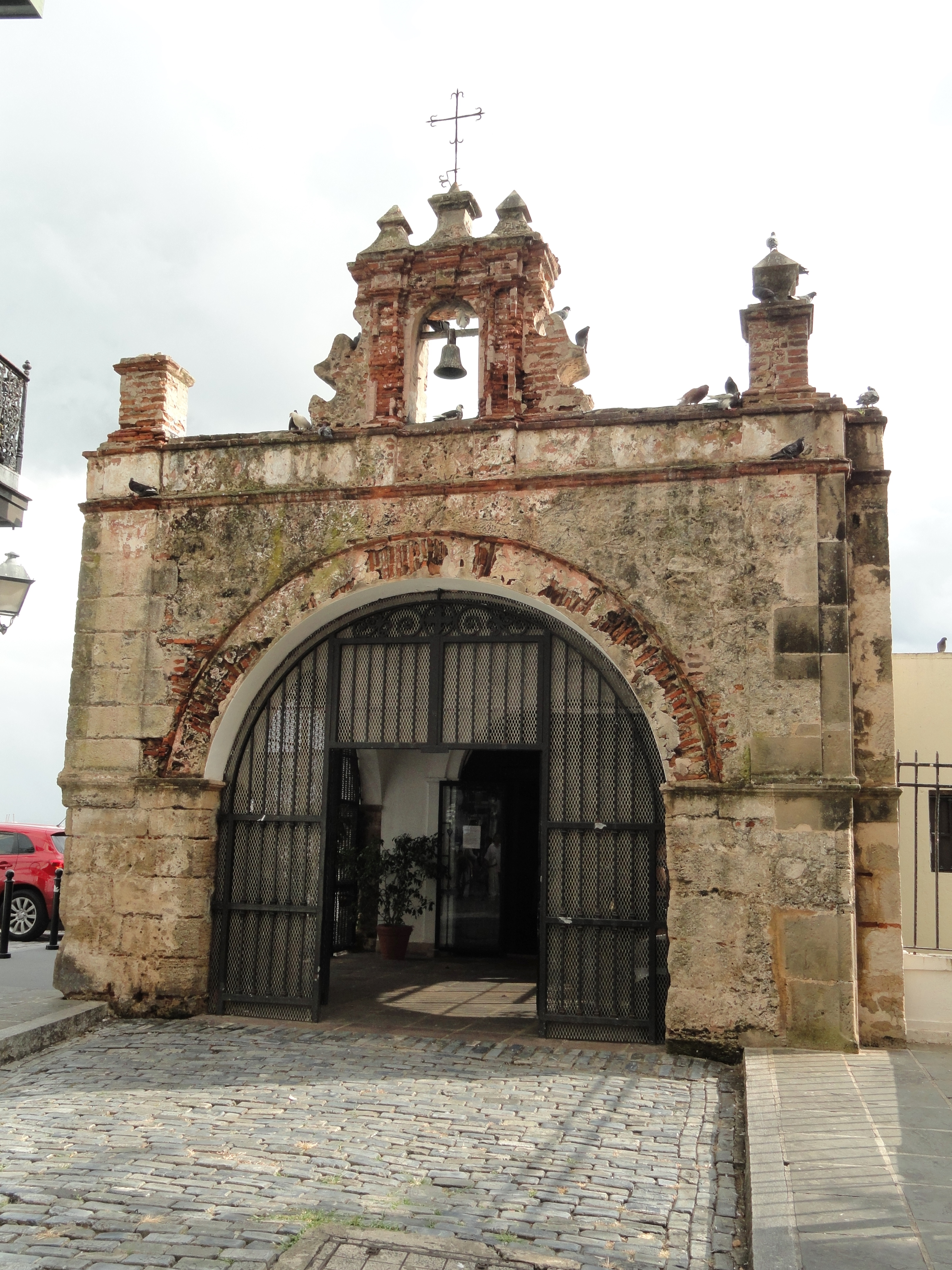
Capilla del Cristo (1753) in Old San Juan

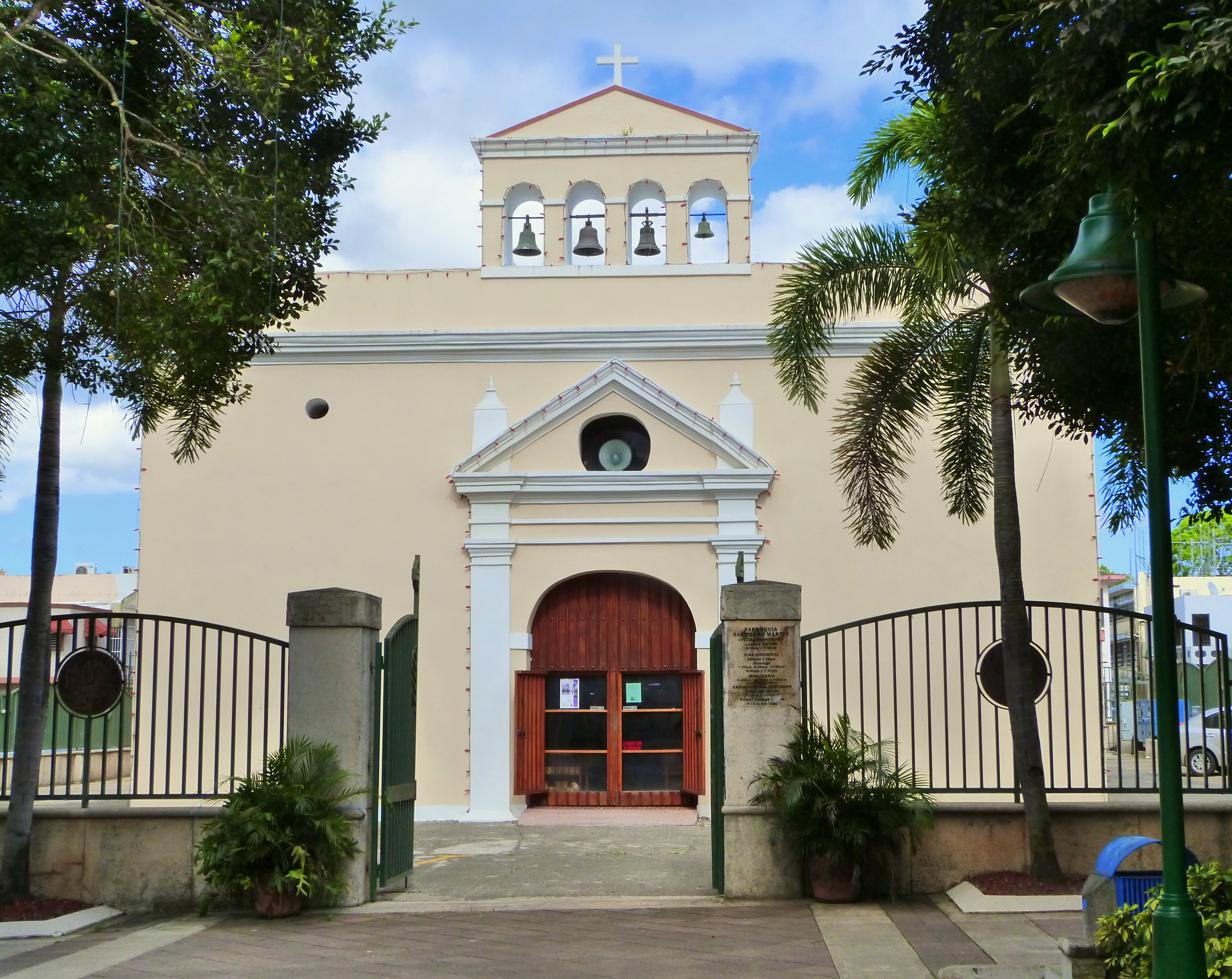
San Pedro Mártir Church (1775) in Guaynabo

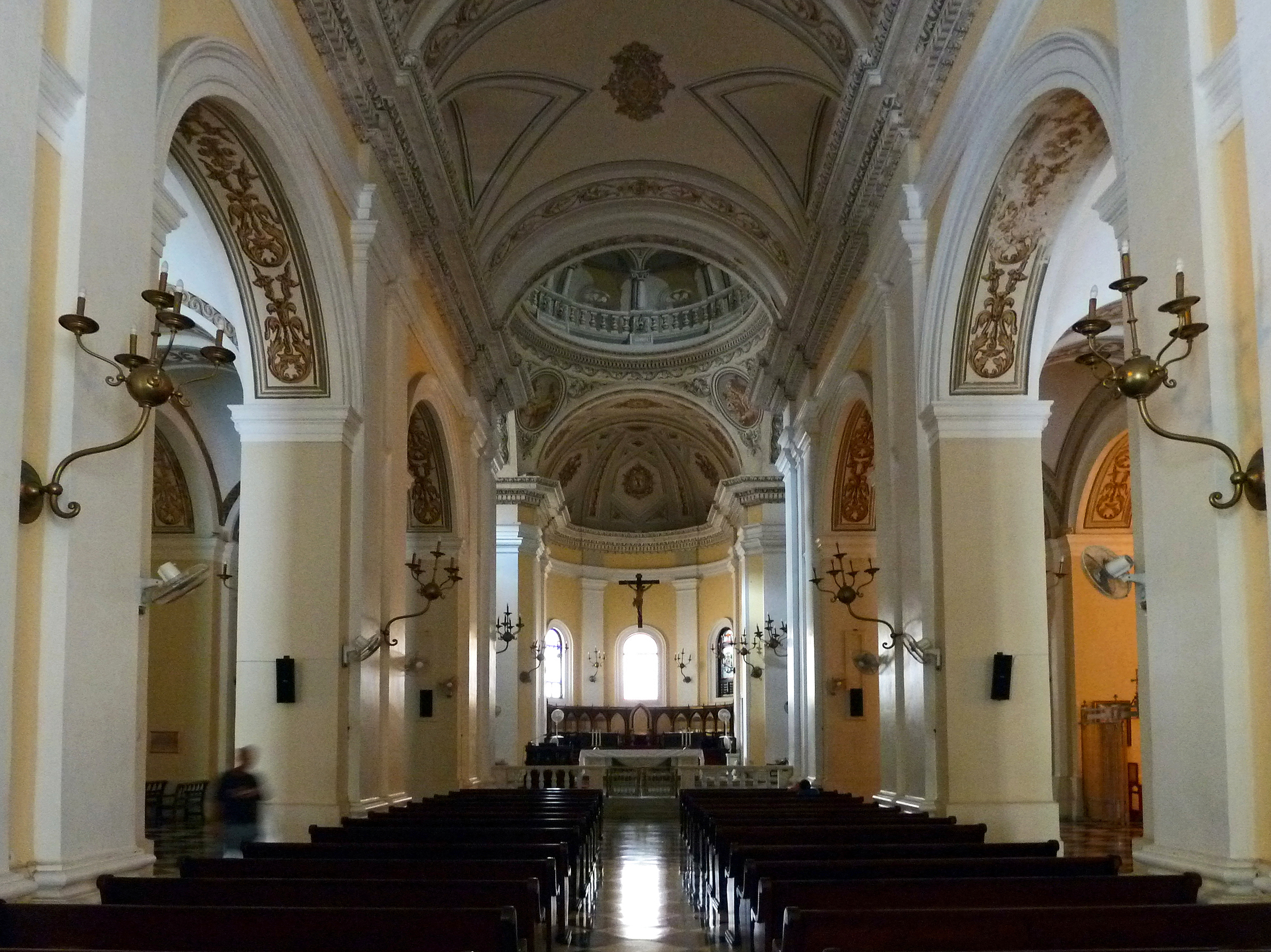
Trompe-l'œil in the 18th-century nave of the Cathedral of San Juan

=== Civic architecture ===
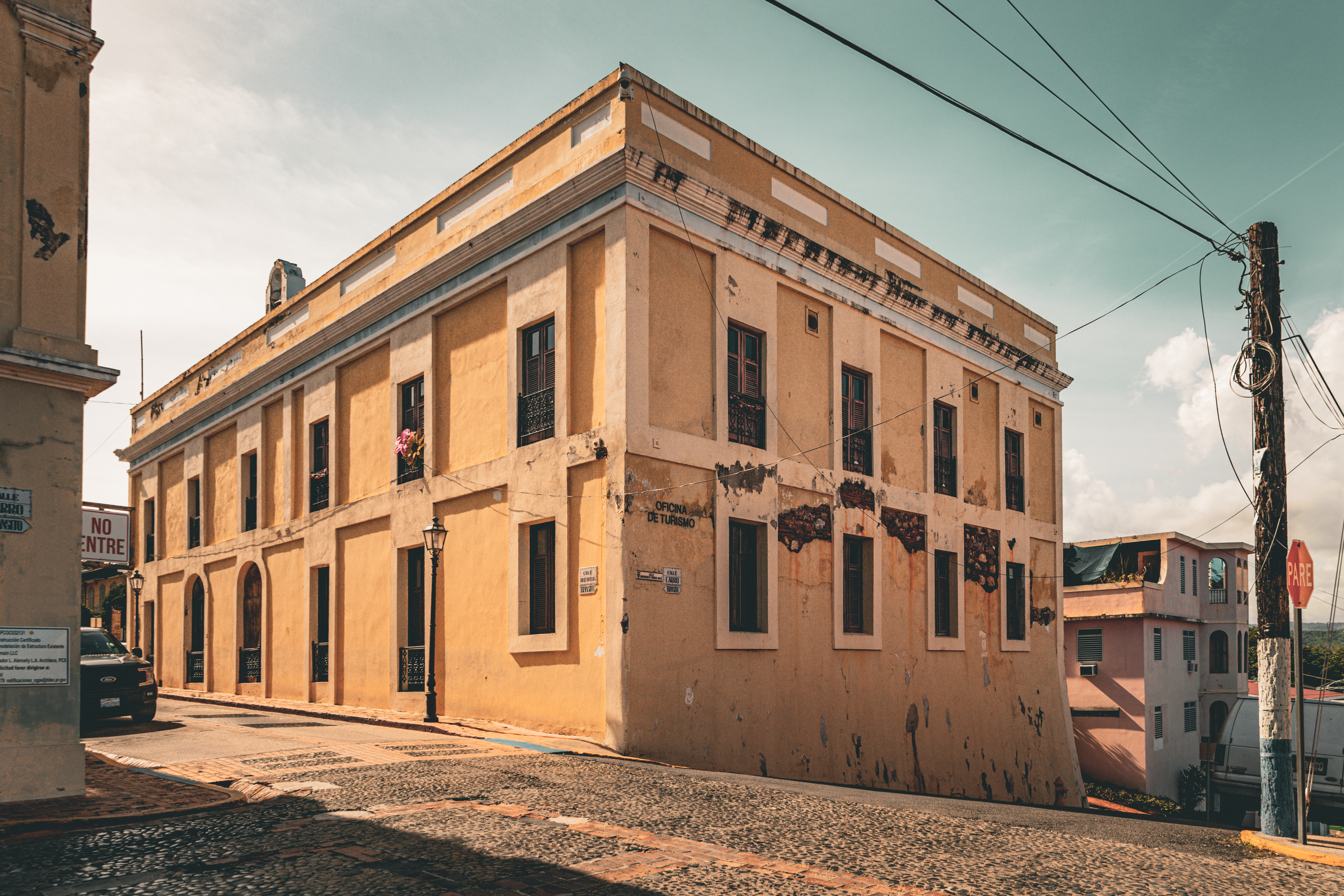
Former city hall of San Germán

As with the Roman Catholic churches that were built at the main town squares of Puerto Rico, the Law of the Indies also called for the construction of cabildos, municipal colonial administrative council halls that would later be known as city or town halls (alcaldías or casas consistoriales). The oldest existing one in Puerto Rico is the San Juan City Hall, first established as the cabildo of San Juan in 1604 (the façade however dates to 1840). Another example is the former city hall of San Germán (today the municipal tourism office) built in the 18th century. The central courtyard of the Ponce City Hall, the first purpose-built in Puerto Rico also dates to the 18th century although the wider building dates to the 19th century. Other administrative structures, such as casas del rey (Spanish for "king's houses"), regional and municipal civic buildings that would also house the local militias, jails and other administrative infrastructure, also date to this era. Other than the San Juan, San Germán and Ponce city halls, no cabildos or casas del rey dating to before the 19th-century exist today, as these were usually destroyed or damaged by hurricanes or earthquakes, and torn down to make way for bigger and more modern civic buildings during the 19th and 20th centuries.

=== Early vernacular styles ===
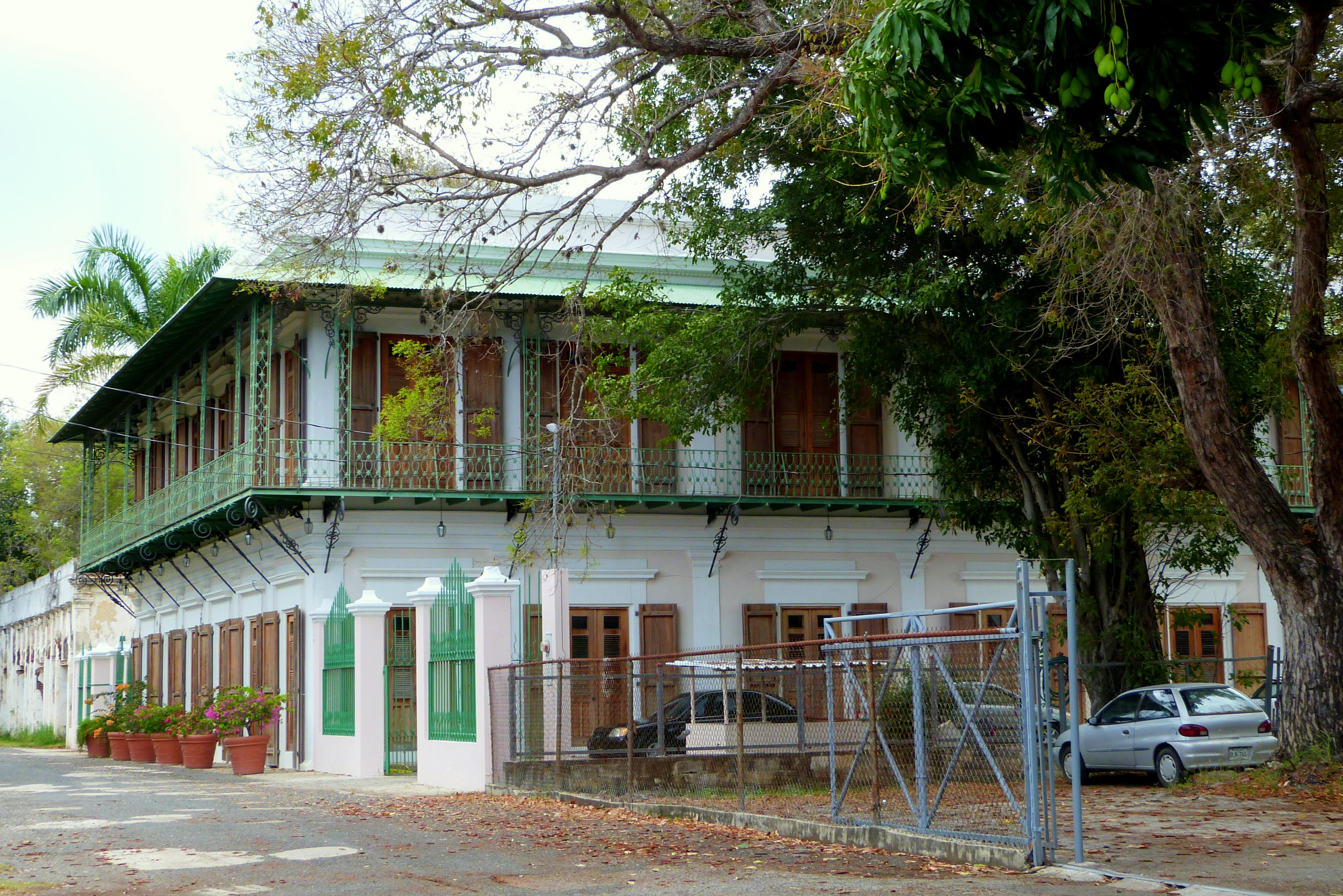
Hacienda Santa Rita manor house (1800) in Guánica

The earliest development of vernacular styles in the island were heavily linked to the Taino building practices. These types of structures, although not built to last, were ideal for the tropical climate and the early lack of sturdy building resources during the beginning of the Spanish conquest. The first farmer settlers to the island would also usually live in palm-thatched roofed (yaguas) structures (casas de yagua) very similar to the Taino huts (bohio) and longhouses (caney). These structures could be easily rebuilt in the aftermath of natural disasters such as hurricanes and earthquakes. The word "bohio" would soon be incorporated into Puerto Rican Spanish, where to this day it is still used to refer to any rudimental wooden hut, which would become the quintessential home of the Puerto Rican jíbaro later in the 18th and 19th centuries.

Spanish settlers began importing Andalusian courtyard-house traditions by the 16th and 17th centuries. These types of residences (casas patio), usually established by the noble and military social classes, provided ventilation that helped its residents cope with the tropical heat of the island. Their wide windows adapted to the often sunny weather provided natural lighting in addition to further ventilation. Other Andalusian and Canary Islander (isleño) influences include rot and fire-resistant clay tiles (tejas criollas) and wooden side galleries that would blend the exterior and interior layers of the houses. These ventilation elements were also applied onto rural houses where wide windows on wattle-and-daub walls (bahareques) began to be incorporated into larger and more permanent residences, some of which were meant to house slaves. Later during the 18th century, with the establishment of bigger rural haciendas, manor houses steadily incorporated these Spanish architectural elements utilizing stone, brick and cement applied to both industrial and residential utilities, such as in Hacienda Santa Elena of Toa Baja. Away from the strict urban parameters of the Law of the Indies, vernacular architecture in rural Puerto Rico had already achieved a distinctive identity by the 18th-century with the blending of Taino building practices and Spanish spatial organization techniques. Many of the coastal forests of the island were flattened during this time due to the ideal use of native hardwoods, meant to be used not only for industrial purposes but also in the wooden frames of houses for the now rapidly growing population.

== 19th century ==
The Law of the Indies and Spanish architectural trends continued informing the construction practices of Puerto Rico into the 19th century. Numerous parish churches and town halls began to be built in the recently founded towns, incorporating subtle Baroque designs from the previous century into a new wave of Spanish Neoclassical styles, fueled by the Bourbon Reforms, that would later influence Puerto Rican civic and vernacular architectural styles later in the century. The Royal Decree of Graces, approved by the Spanish Crown in 1815, opened Puerto Rico to non-Spanish European immigration, slowly prompting the incorporation of additional European architectural trends originating beyond the Iberian peninsula. Some later 19th-century examples of this could be found in the manorial palaces and townhouses erected by immigrant French and Corsican coffee and sugar industrialists, and in the rising popularity of Creole-style porches in smaller vernacular homes.

=== Neoclassical movements of the 19th century ===
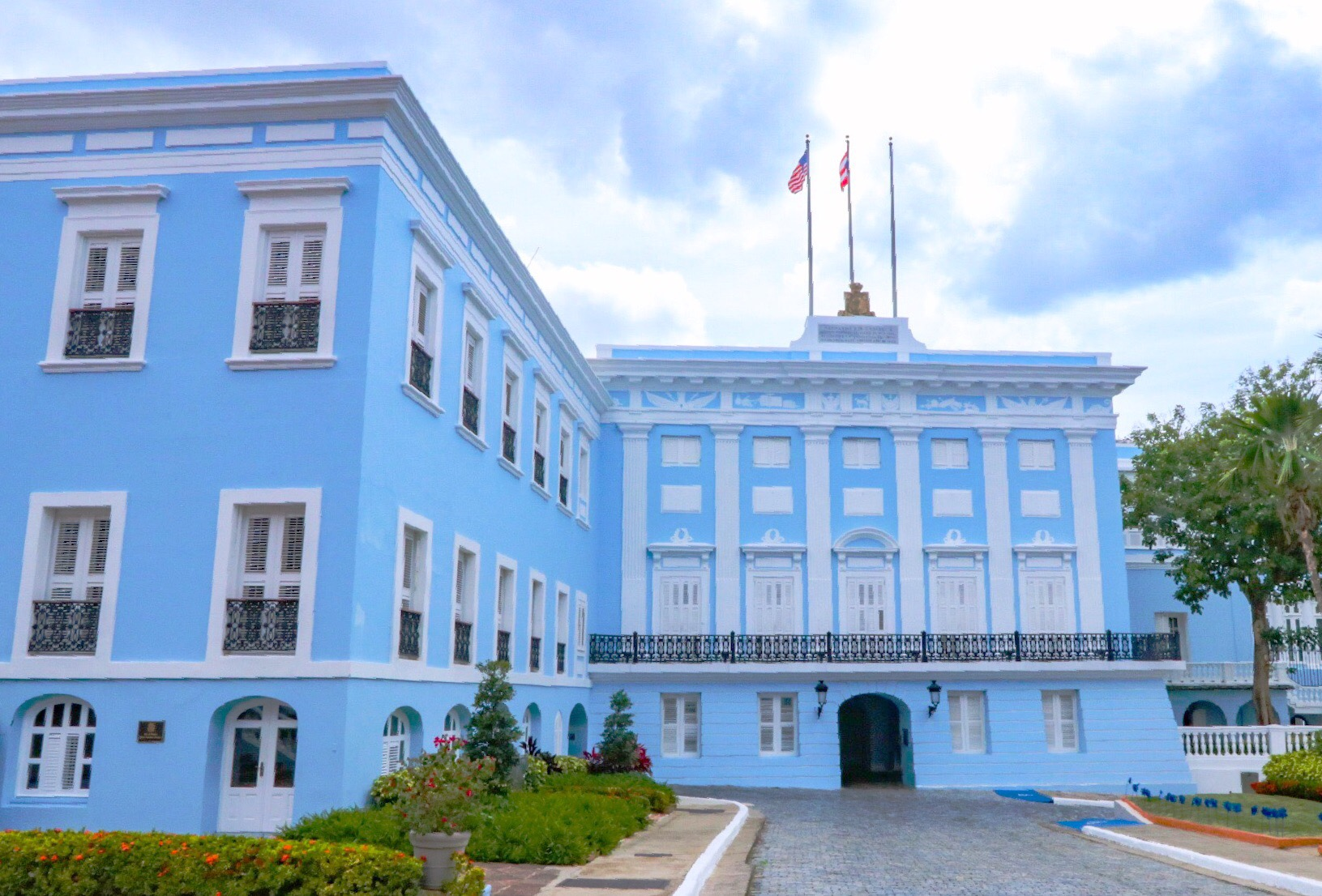
Rafael Arístegui y Vélez's 1846 Neoclassical façade of La Fortaleza, also known as the Palacio de Santa Catalina

The Age of Enlightenment, heralded by the American and French revolutions of the previous century, brought about a new wave of attention to the Greco-Roman arts, which was further motivated by contemporary archaeological discoveries in Pompeii, for example. The Spanish Crown, now fully part of the House of Bourbon since the death of Charles II in 1700 (the last Habsburg monarch of Spain), had implemented a series of reforms that revolutionized the colonial logistics that were previously dictated through the Law of the Indies. These reforms, first implemented during the 18th century, were later informed by the mercantilist economic policies that were bourgeoned by the French Revolution. Powerful legal bodies during this time, such as the Council of the Indies, were stripped of their localized influence and redirected back to the Spanish Crown. The power of the Spanish Crown made itself more explicit in the form of urban civic construction projects enacted throughout Puerto Rico, particularly in the so-called casas del rey, comprehensive and integrated regional and municipal civic complexes that would function as city hall, court, military headquarters, jail and execution site. These types of municipal structures were usually designed in the Neoclassical style that became the primary cultural movement of the Spanish Empire at the time as a utilitarian tool to demonstrate modernization and imperial superiority and continuity. One of the most notable examples of this type of structure was the Casa del Rey de Ponce (today the Ponce City Hall), which served as a model to all municipal buildings that were constructed later in the century, most notably the Caguas and Arecibo city halls. The scope of the Roman Catholic Church was further strengthened in its role as the official state religion of Bourbon Spain and its colonies, and many church construction projects happened at the time in order to modernize the already existing hermitages and wooden parish churches built throughout the number of recently founded towns during the end of the 18th century and the beginning of the 19th century. In San Juan, the Spanish colonial capital of Puerto Rico, La Fortaleza underwent major alterations, transforming the fortified headquarters of the governor into a luxurious executive palace during the mid-19th century.

==== Neoclásico Isabelino ====
The official 19th-century state practices of utilitarian construction and Neoclassical architecture use quickly translated into the civil and secular context during the middle of the century. Heralded by the key importance of its city hall, Ponce, the largest city in Puerto Rico at the time, soon became the epicenter of the localization of these Neoclassical styles. Unlike San Juan, which was a strictly governed military stronghold, the city of Ponce enjoyed an administrative and social freedom that allowed its administrators to focus on aesthetics in their local construction projects. This was the birth of the Isabelline Neoclassical (Neoclásico Isabelino) style of architecture to be born in the 1850s and 1860s. This style of Neoclassical architecture is named after Queen Isabella II, queen regent of Spain at the time, who granted Ponce its city rights in 1848. Although many of the major Isabelline Neoclassical construction projects were often civic in nature (such as hospitals, asylums and prisons), they also informed large-scale industrialist projects in the form of trade and warehouses built by some of the most prominent sugarcane barons of the time. With the population boom caused by the large scale European immigration to Puerto Rico at the time, urban areas began to develop in both demographic and financial size. The time also saw a trend of industrialists moving their headquarters from their haciendas into the city. Examples of these include the Picó Pomar Residence, first erected as a coffee and sugarcane trade house in Coamo in 1840, and the Vives House, built originally for the same purpose in Ponce in 1860.

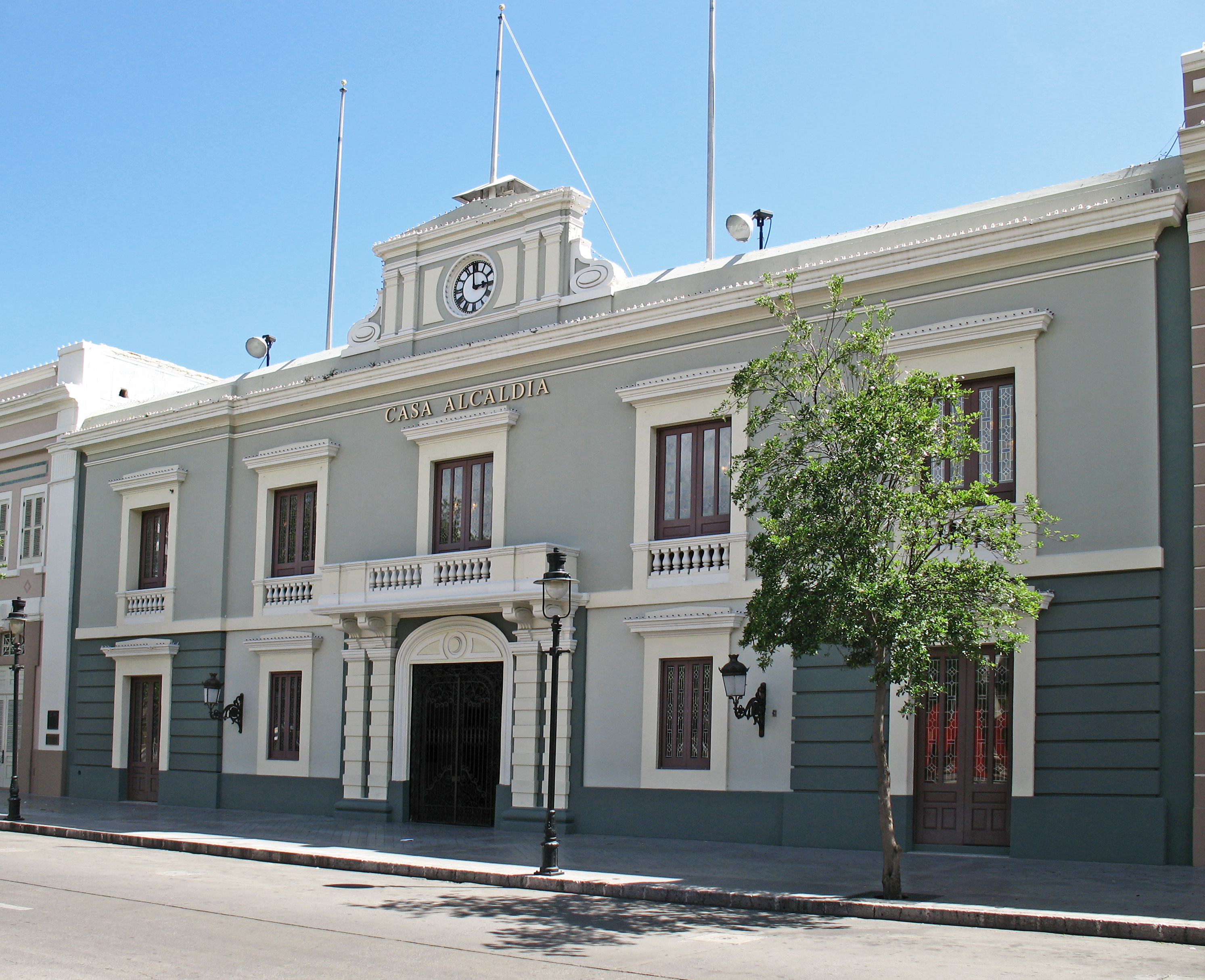
Ponce City Hall (1840)

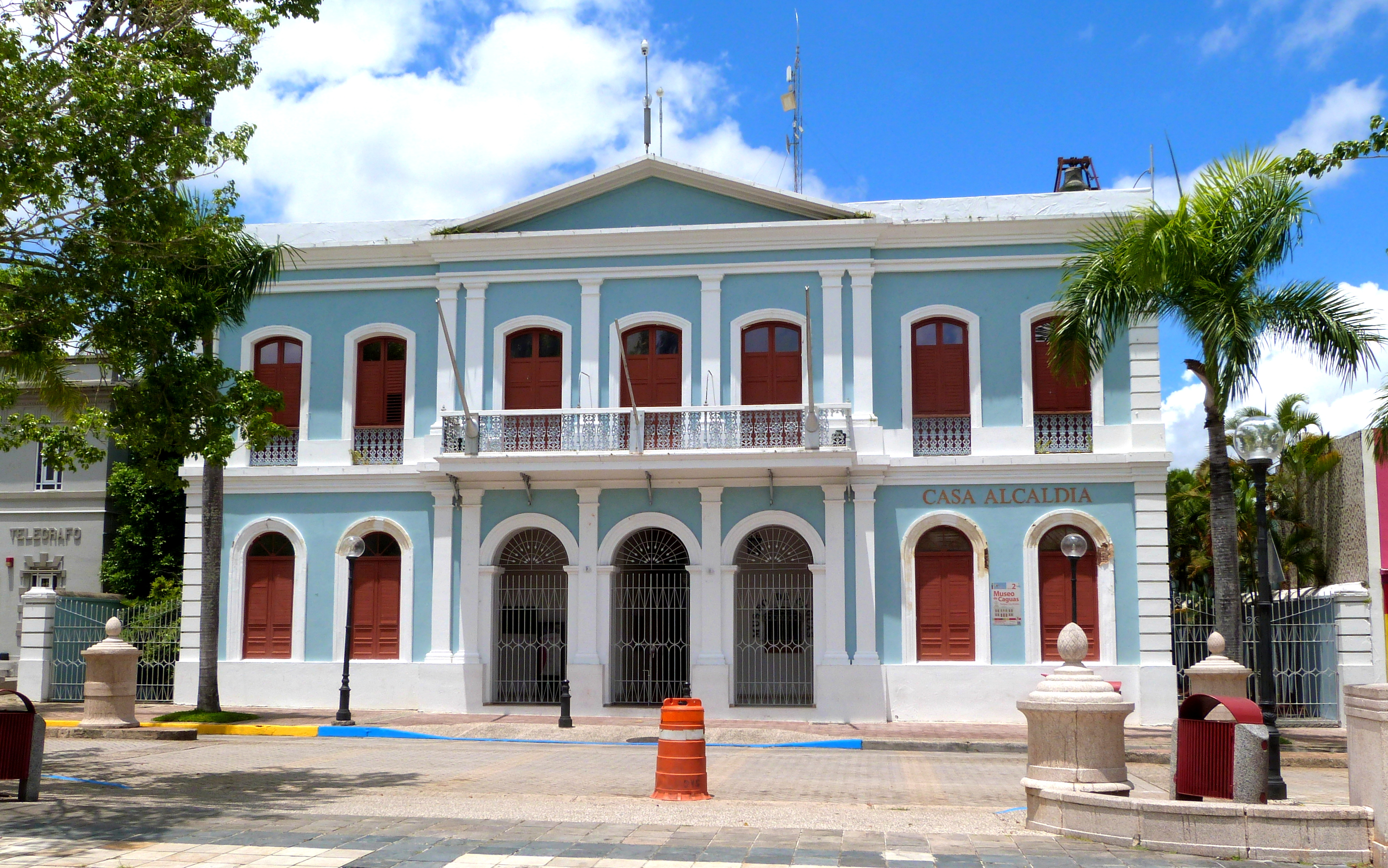
Caguas City Hall (1856)

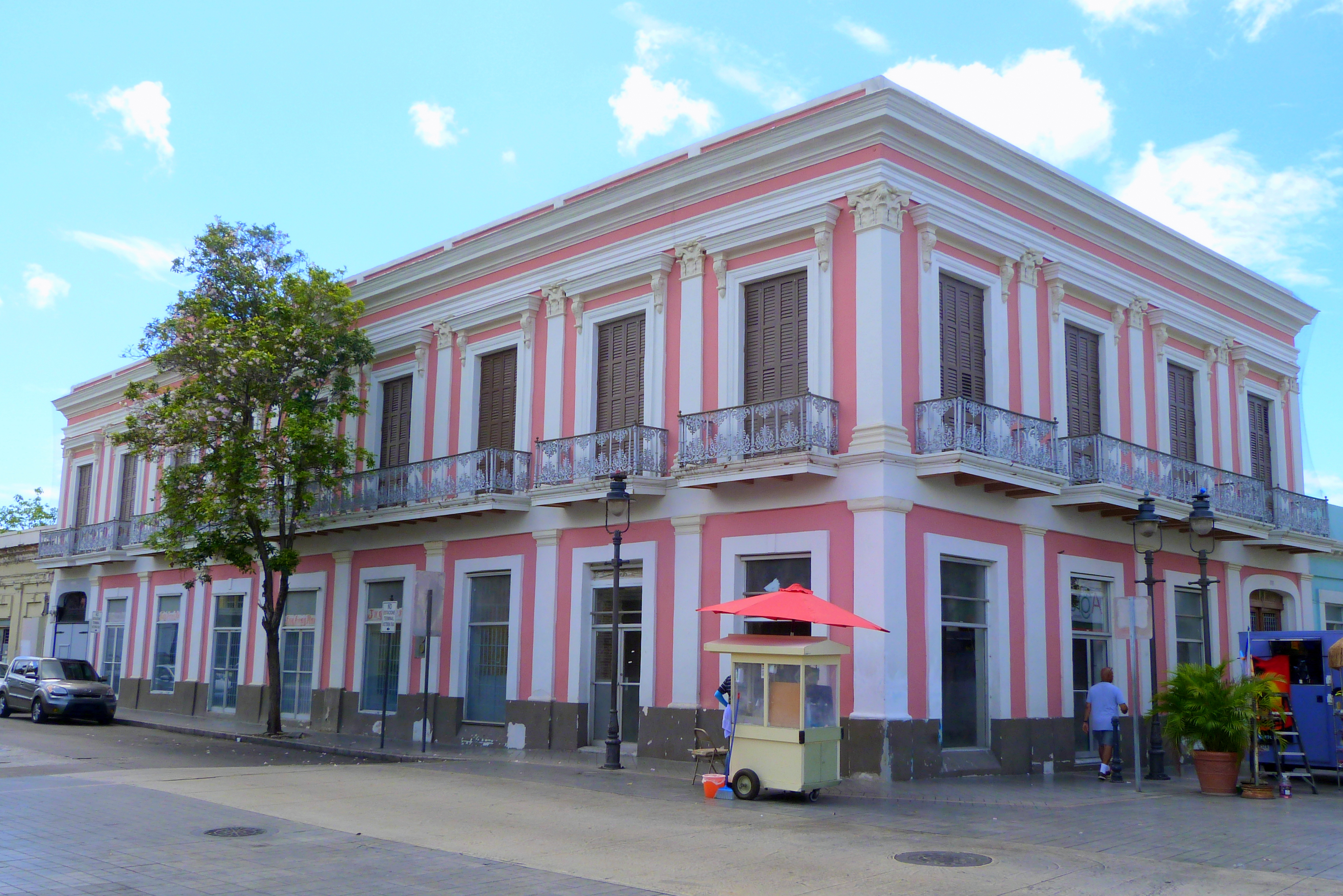
Vives House (1860) in Ponce

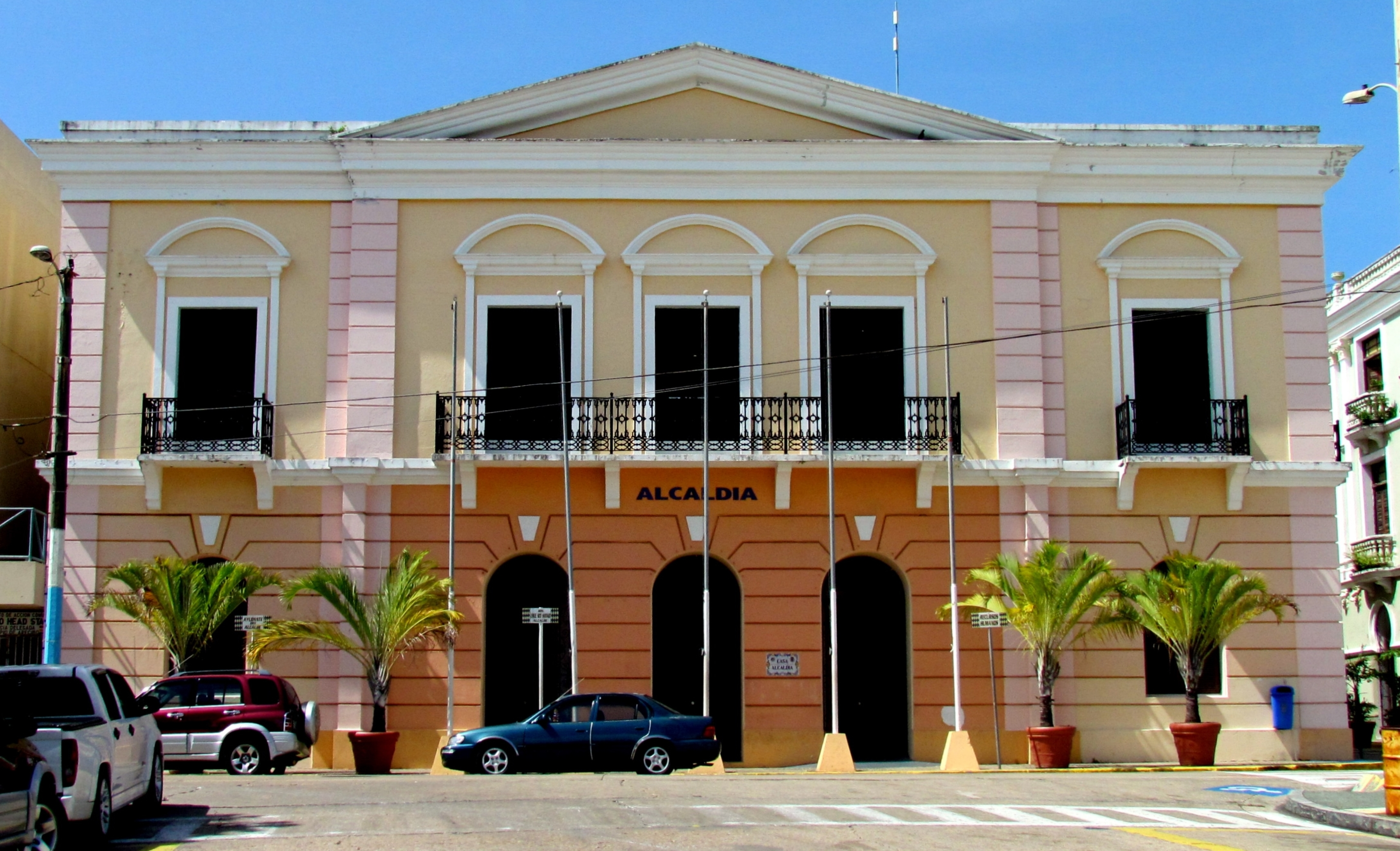
Arecibo City Hall (1866)

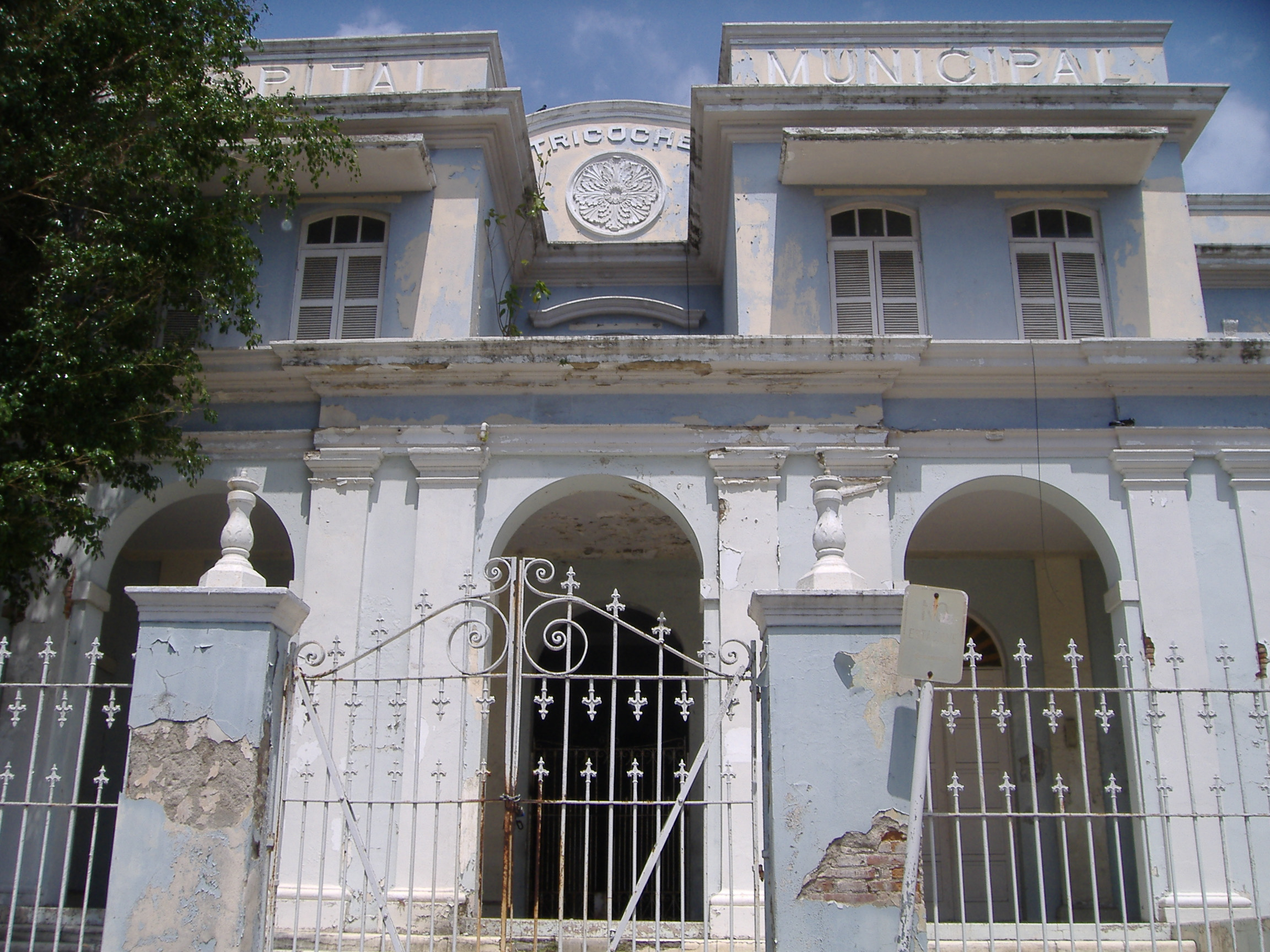
Tricoche Hospital (1873) in Ponce

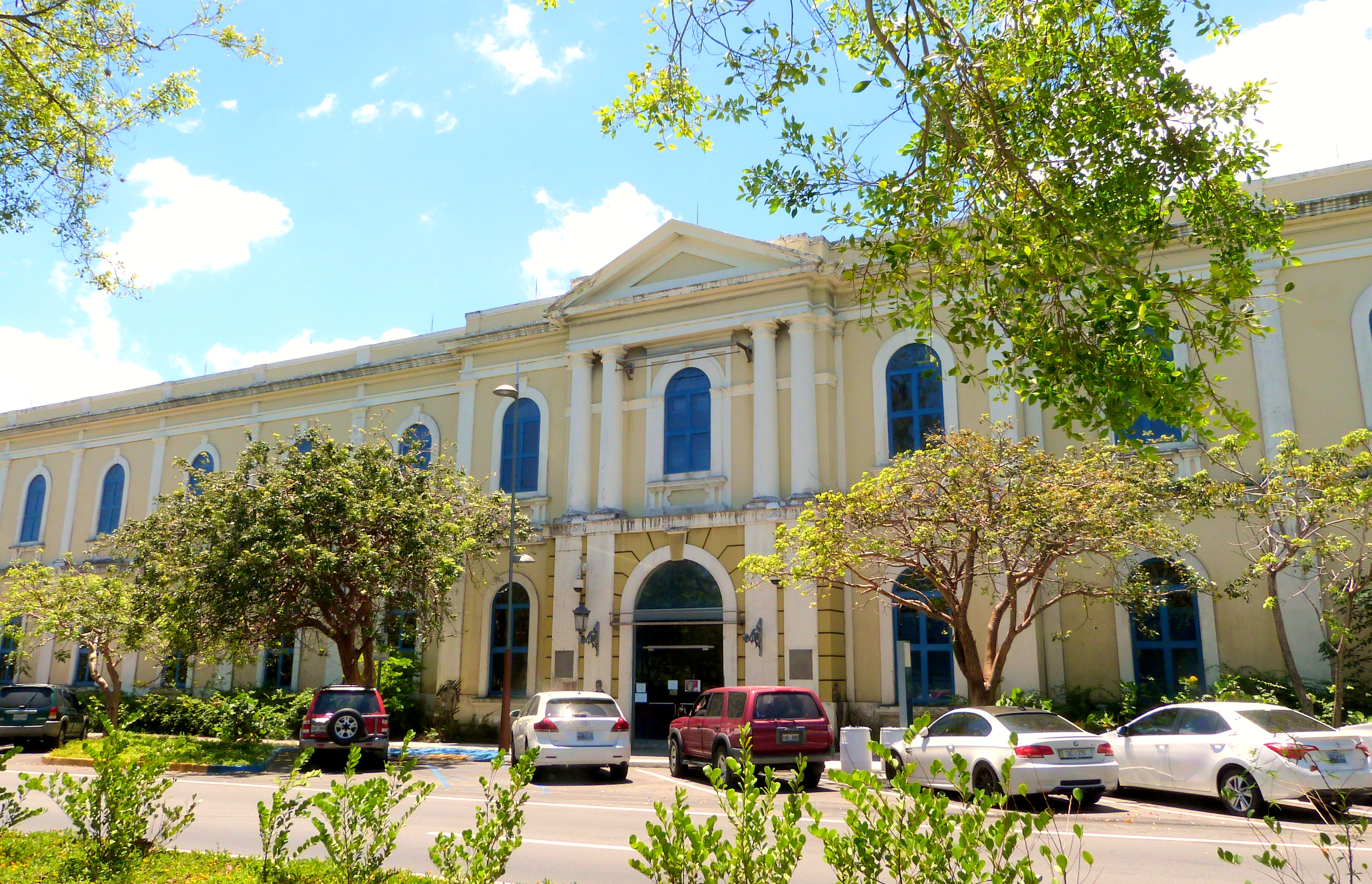
Puerto Rico National Library (1887)

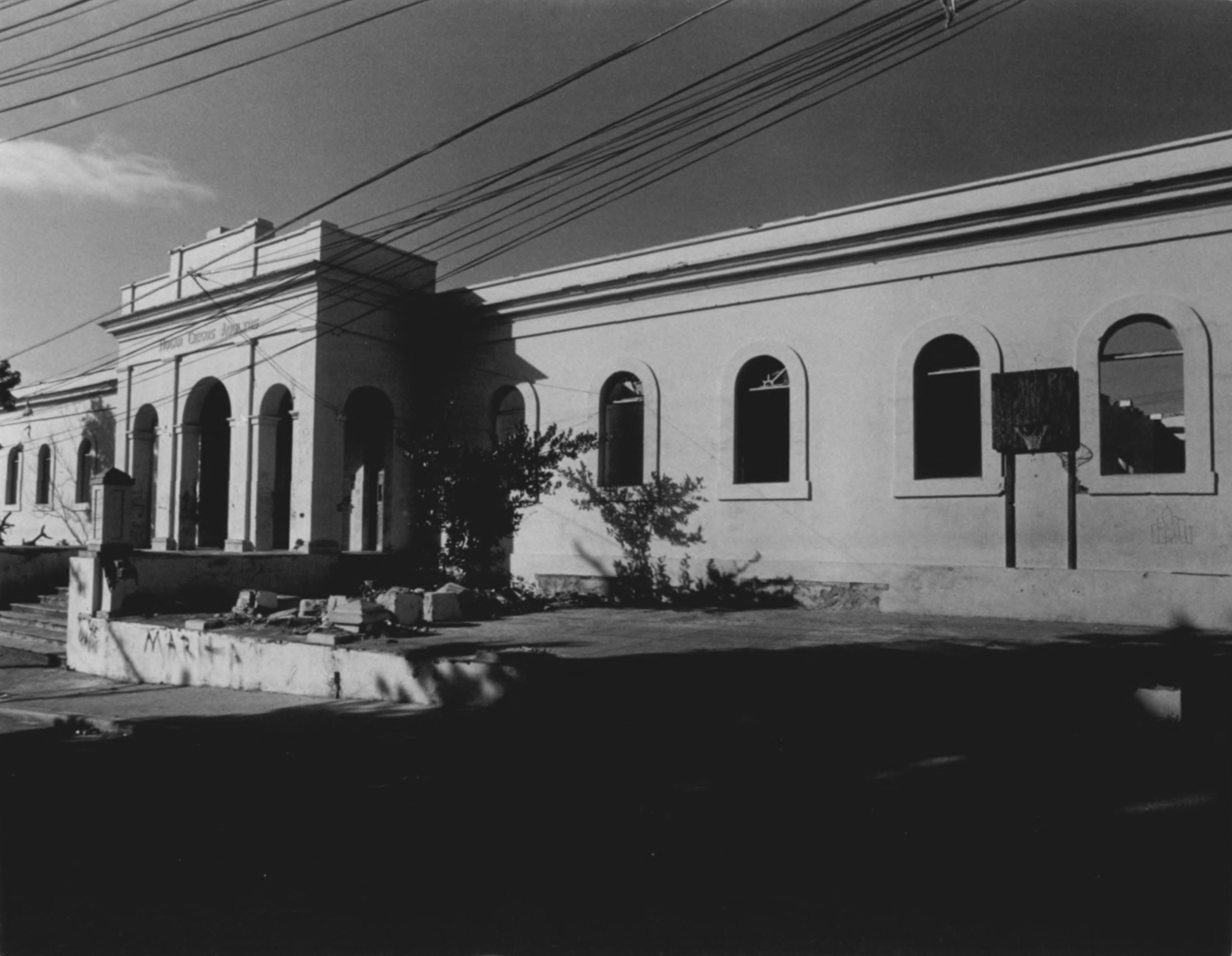
Spanish Military Hospital (1896) in Ponce

=== 19th-century vernacular architecture ===
==== Ponce Creole ====
As Ponce boomed in financial and cultural importance due to the explosion of the coffee and sugarcane industry, so did grew its physical urban development as numerous industrialists moved their residences and workspaces to the city away from their properties in the mountains and fields. Many of these industrialists were also French, German and Corsican settlers who came to the island in search of social freedom and financial growth as allowed by the Royal Decree of Graces. Although these non-Spanish settlers would quickly have to adapt linguistically to the Hispanic culture in Puerto Rico, they would bring artistic and architectural elements from their countries of origin that they would then blend in with the local Neoclassical and vernacular trends when building and decorating their residences. This mixture of architectural identities gave way to the development of the Ponce Creole (Criollo Ponceño) style of architecture that permeated the center of Ponce and later various downtowns (pueblos) of the sugarcane growth areas of Puerto Rico, particularly those of Guayama, San Germán and Yauco. European fin de siècle designs were the most prominent influence at the time, particularly Beaux-Arts and the Catalan modernist movement within the Art Nouveau genre. This style of architecture coincided with a city-wide beautification project implemented by Mayor of Ponce Máximo de Meana y Guridi that included the implementation of electricity and the modernization of Plaza de las Delicias, which would later inspire other Puerto Rican municipal governments to follow suit with their own main town squares (plazas). The Ponce Creole style was further cemented with the 1882 Fair Exposition in Ponce, which brought over some of the most important architects of the time to work on the numerous constructions and pavilions (of which only the now-called Parque de Bombas remains today) and consequently canonized this vernacular style into the architectural identity of Puerto Rico. One of the most notable of these architects, Blas C. Silva Boucher, is today known as the "father of the Ponce Creole style", despite being an engineer rather than an architect by training.

European influences

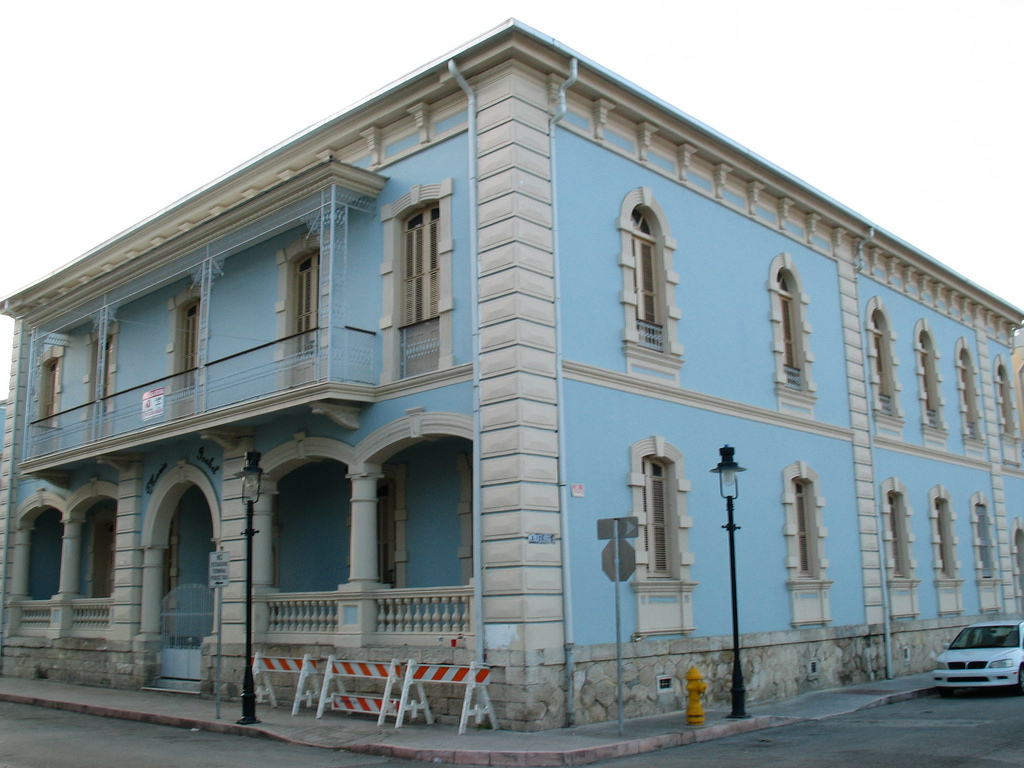
Italianate Rosaly–Batiz House in Ponce

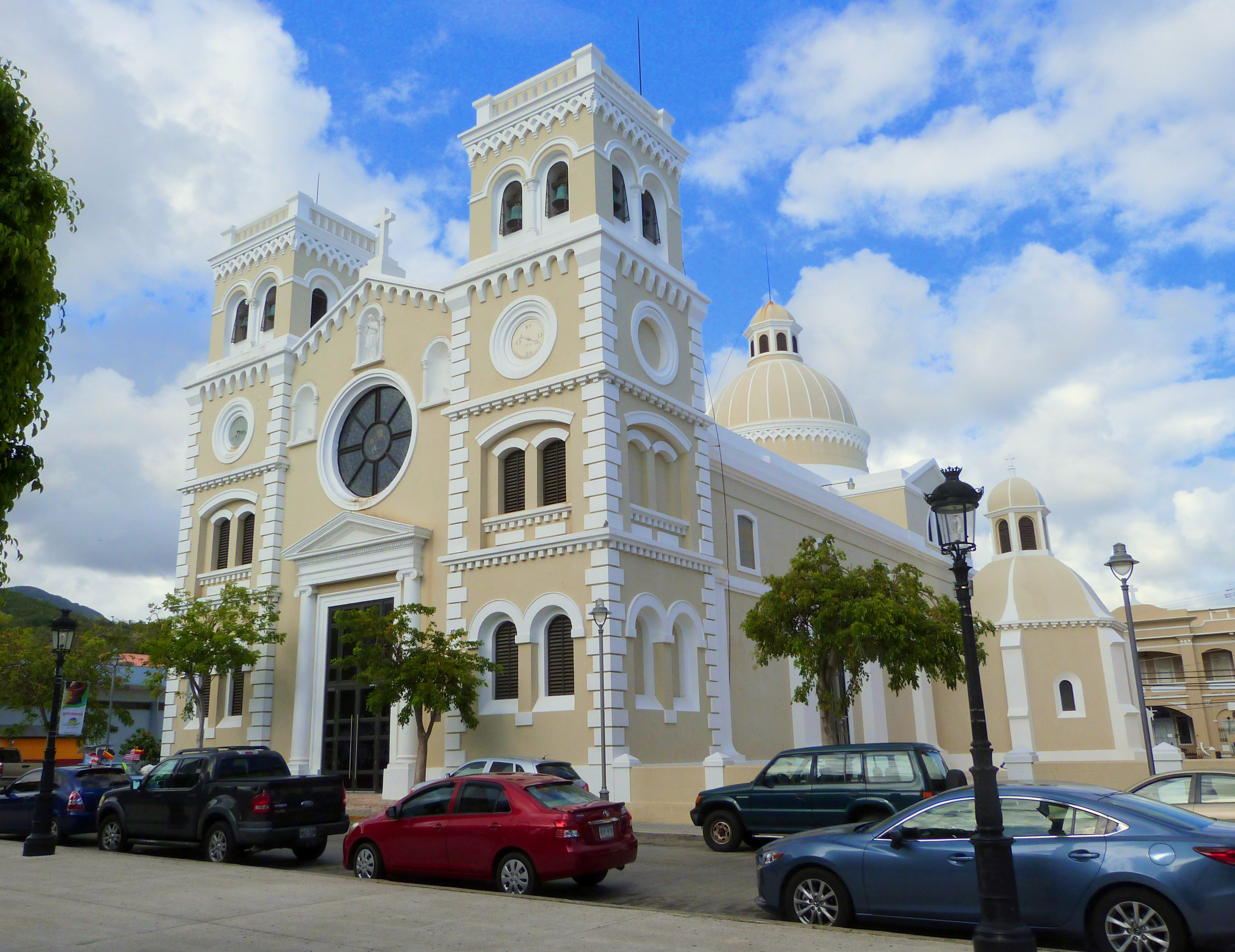
Romanesque Revival-influenced San Antonio de Padua Church in Guayama

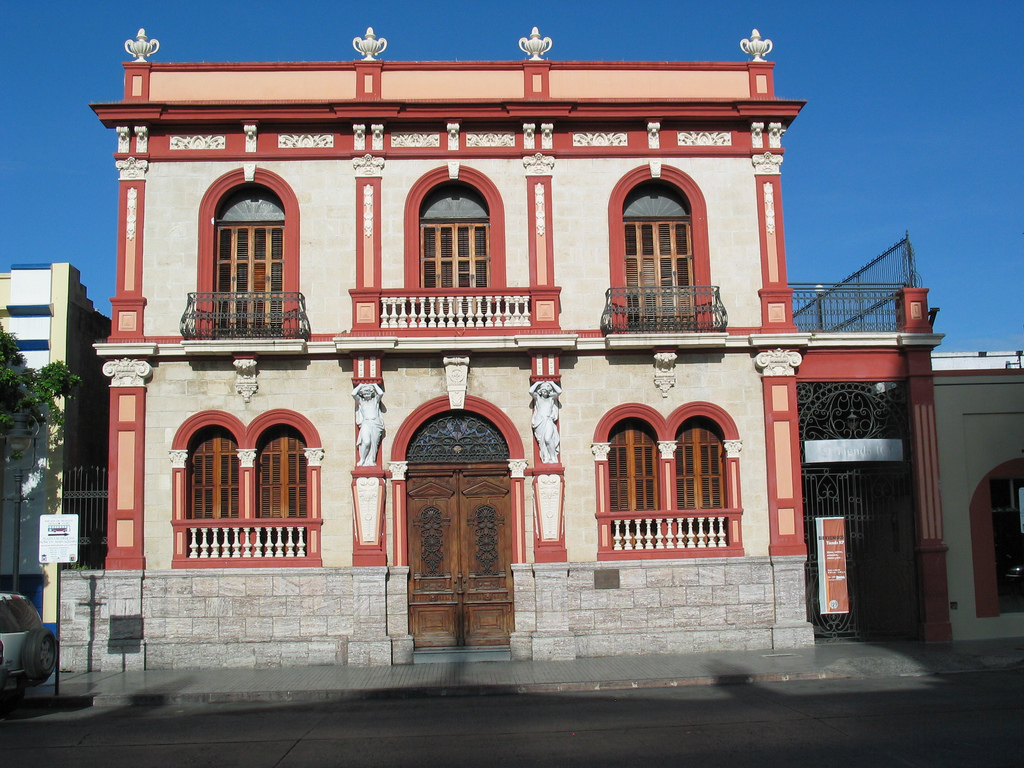
Belle Époque-inspired Armstrong-Toro House in Ponce

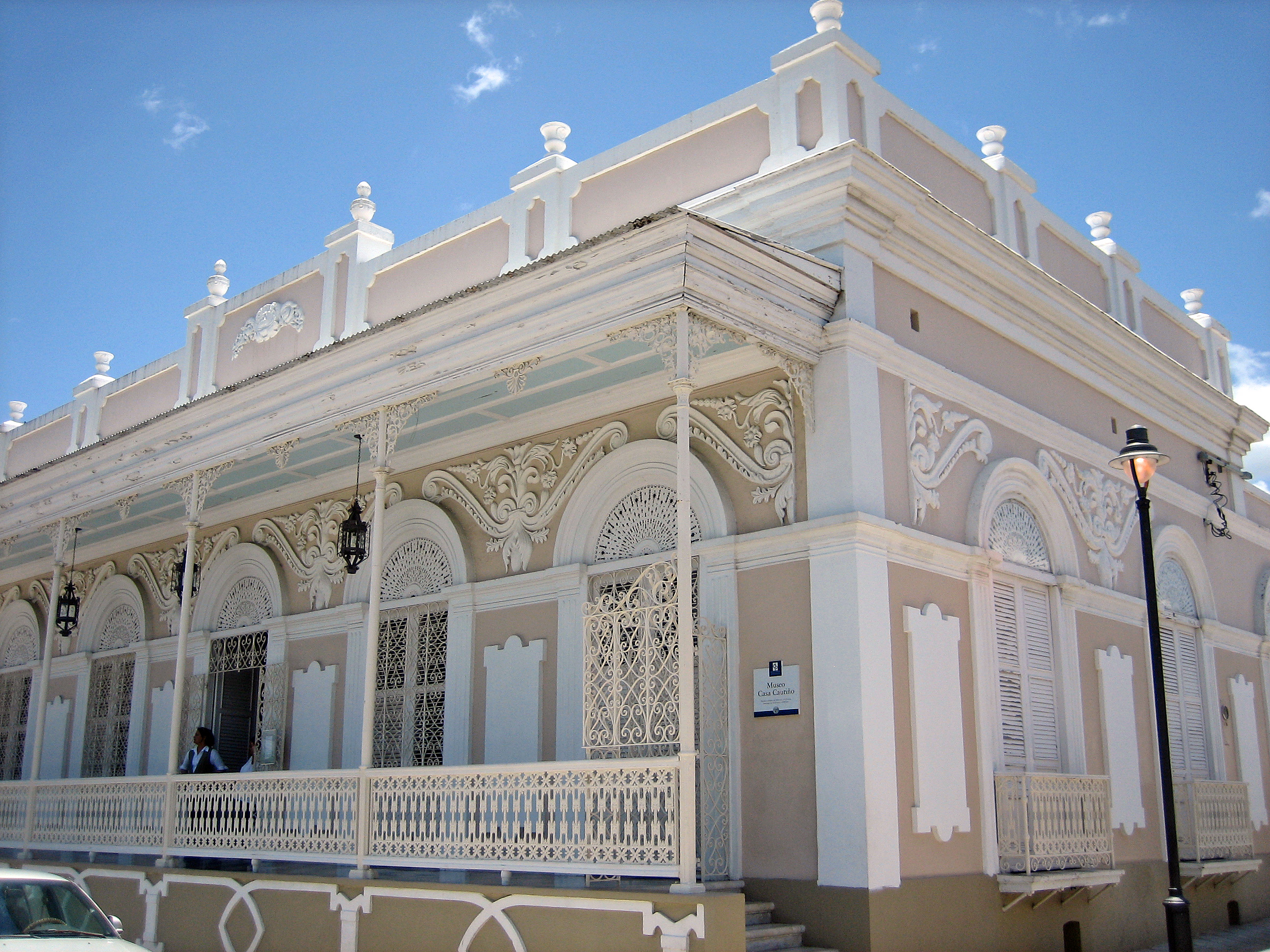
Beaux-Arts-influenced Casa Cautiño in Guayama

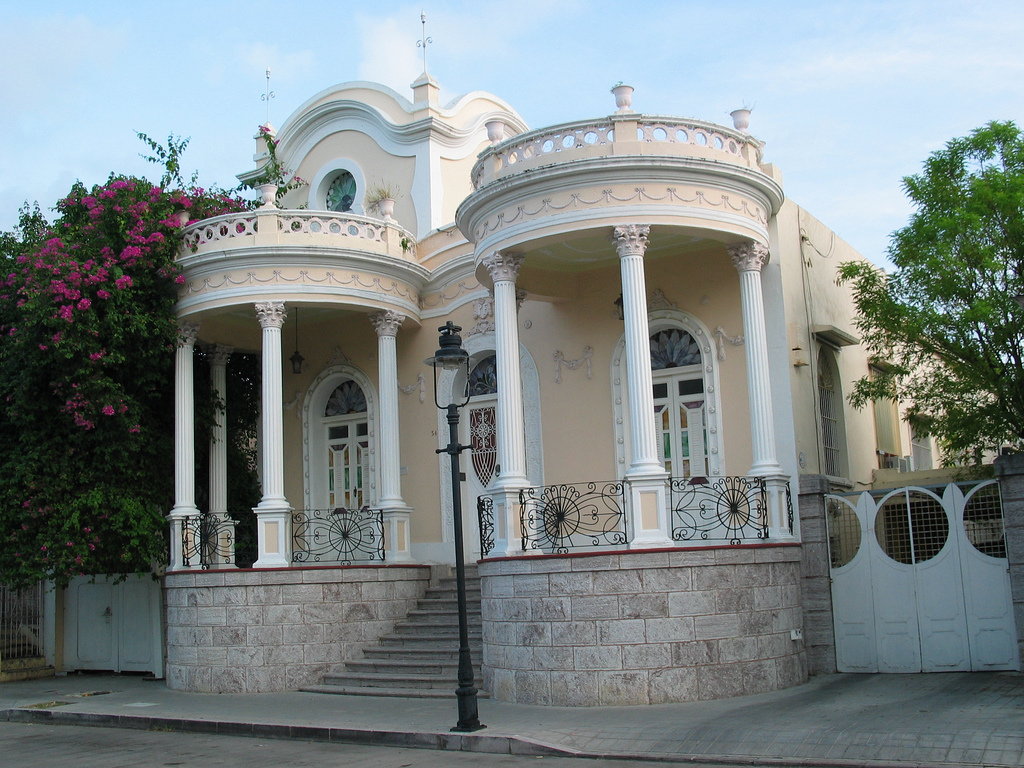
Art Nouveau-inspired Font-Ubides House in Ponce

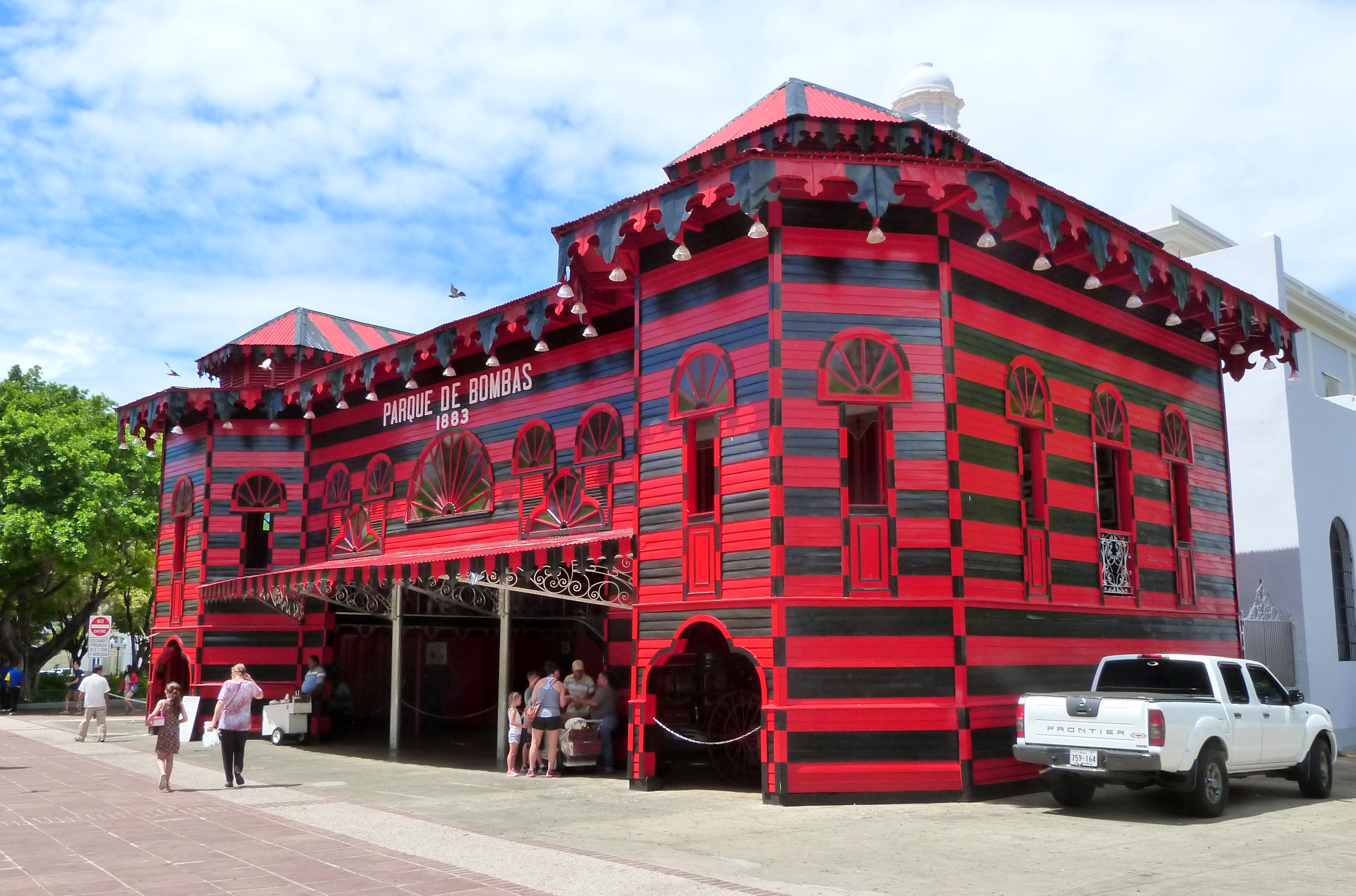
Orientalist (Moorish Revival)-inspired Parque de Bombas exterior in Ponce

The Ponce Creole style of architecture continued to evolve throughout the end of the 19th century and beyond into the first decades of the 20th century, with architects such as Manuel V. Domenech, Alfredo Wiechers Pieretti and Francisco Porrata-Doría gaining notable recognition in Ponce and throughout the island. As Puerto Rico became a territory of the United States in the aftermath of the Spanish–American War of 1898, Ponce continued to be a trendsetter in the development of the 20th-century architecture of Puerto Rico. The vernacular style seen in the construction of notable buildings of the city now incorporated the styles and designs brought over from the United States, particularly the North American Victorian Revivalist movements of the beginning of the turn of the century, particularly the Anglo-American Colonial and Queen Anne styles, and, ironically, the Spanish Colonial and Mission Revival styles which originated in the West Coast of the United States. As the architecture of the United States evolved, so did the Ponce Creole styles which in the incoming decades began to incorporate Art Deco, Prairie and American Craftsman styles. The entirety of the downtown area of Ponce (pueblo de Ponce) is today listed in the Puerto Rico Register of Historic Sites and Zones as the Ponce Historic Zone due to its historical notability as a living museum of architecture that showcases the development and evolution of Puerto Rican architecture.

North American influences

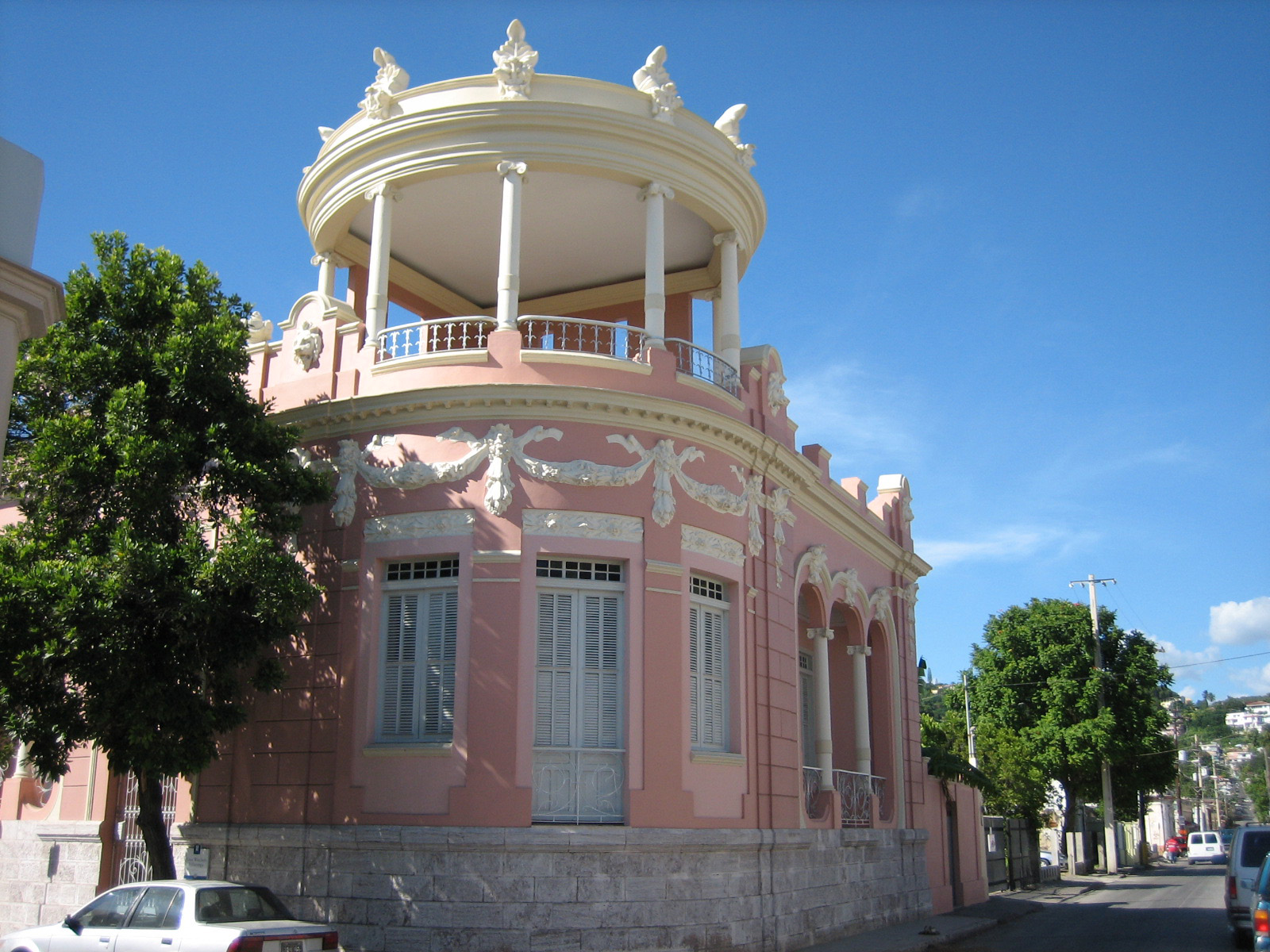
North American Creole elements in the Wiechers-Villaronga House in Ponce

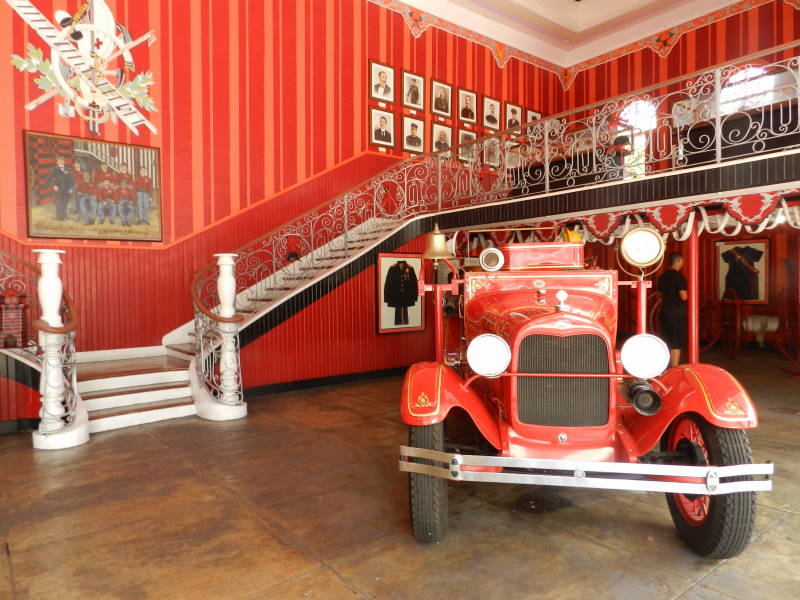
North American Victorian-inspired Parque de Bombas interior in Ponce

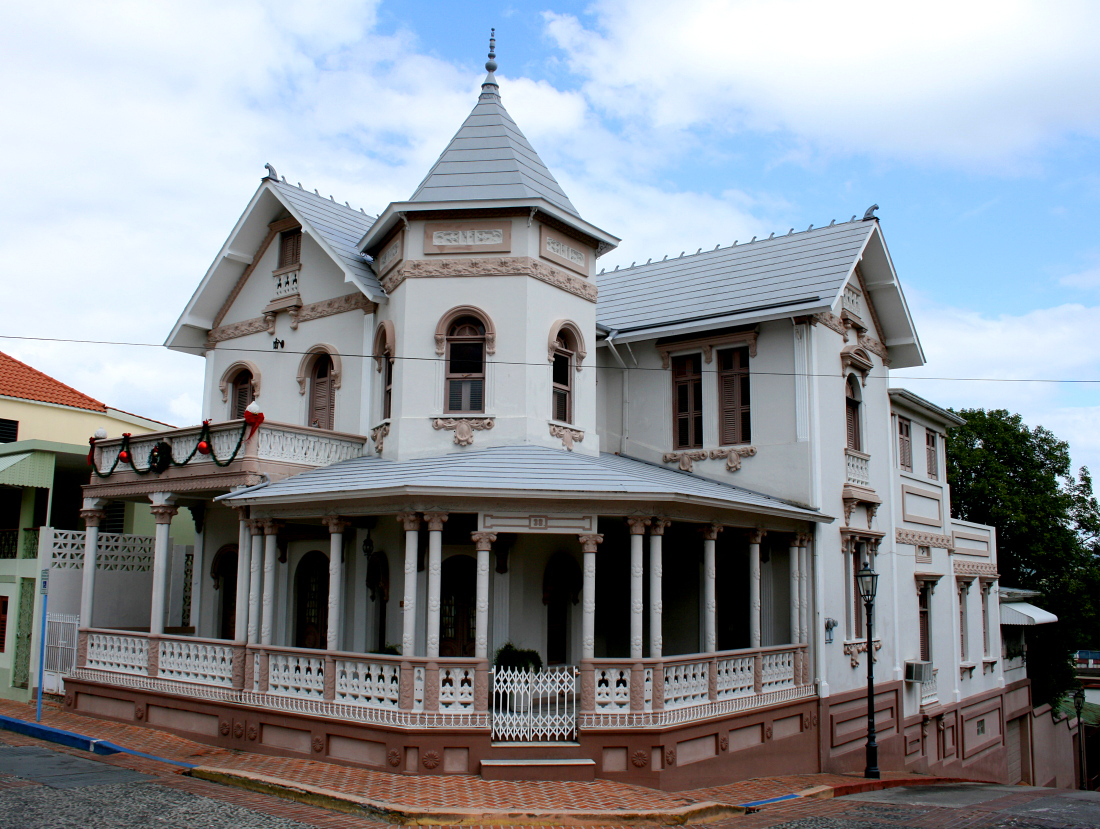
Queen Anne style-influenced Morales Marco House in San Germán

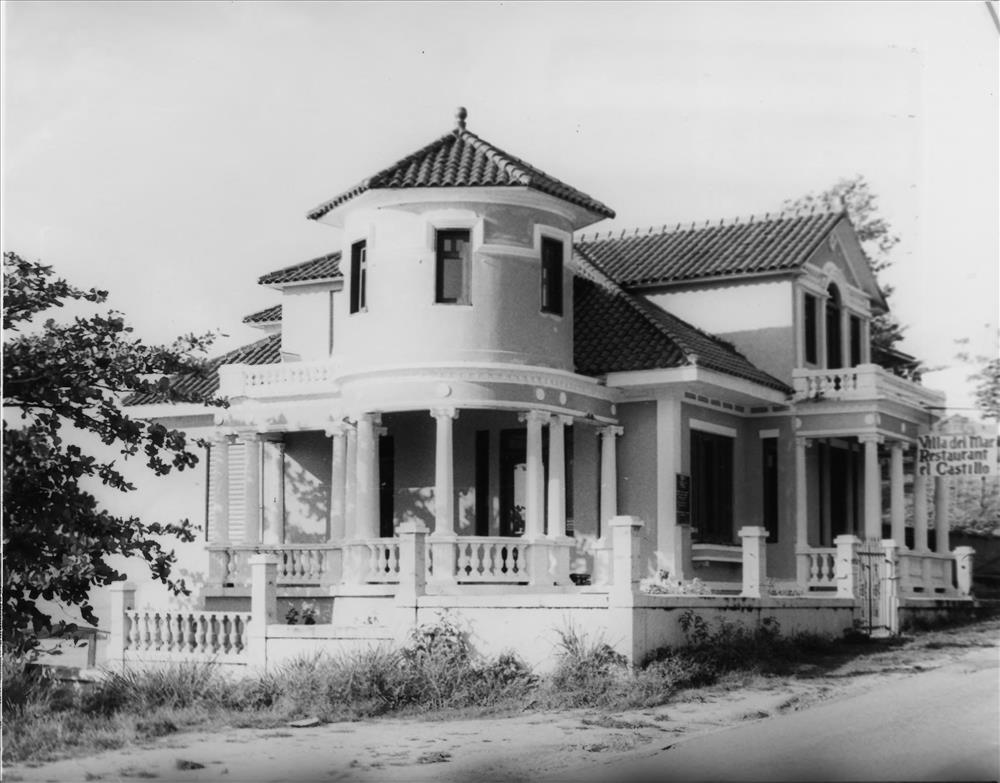
Queen Anne-inspired criollo residence of Villa Del Mar in Naguabo

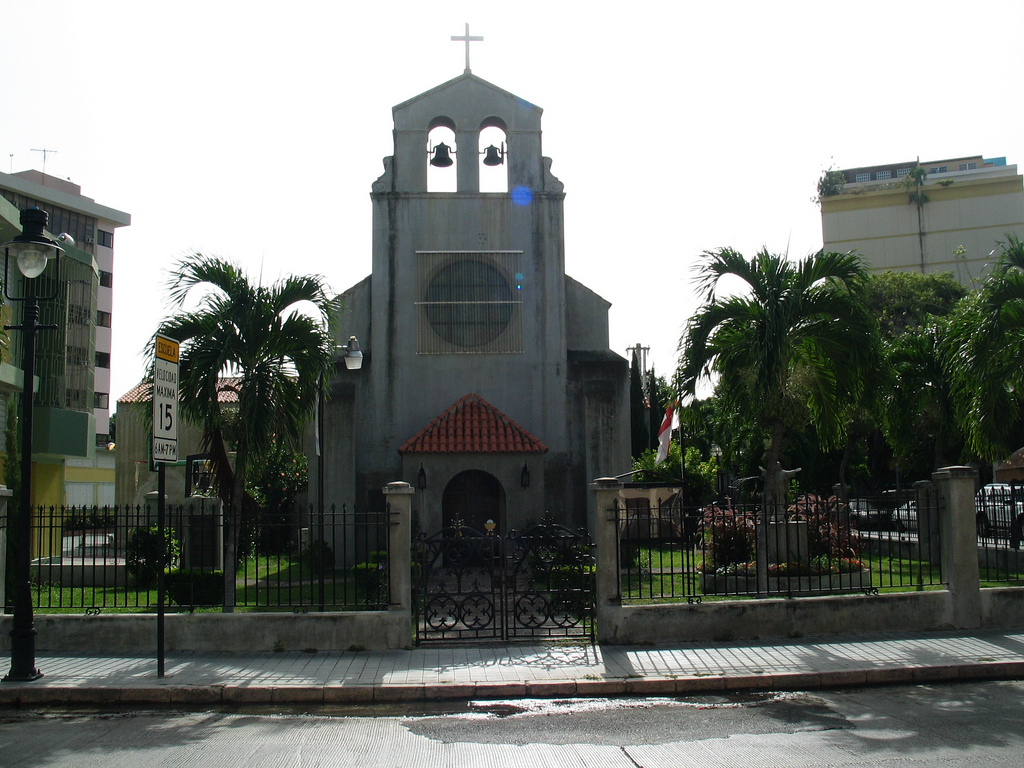
West Coast Mission Revival-inspired Most Holy Trinity Episcopal Church in Ponce
Later applications outside of Ponce

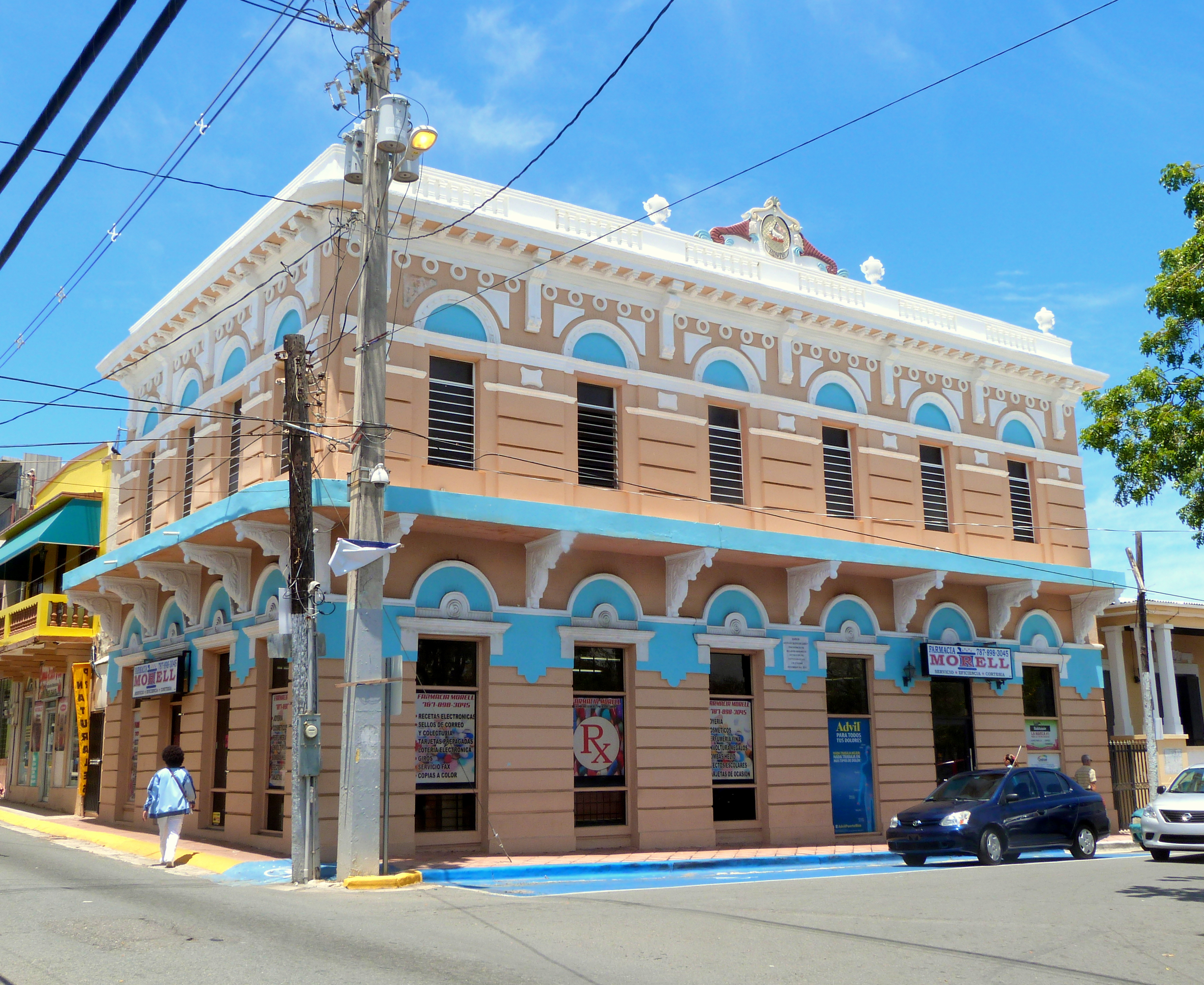
Camuy Casino (1910)

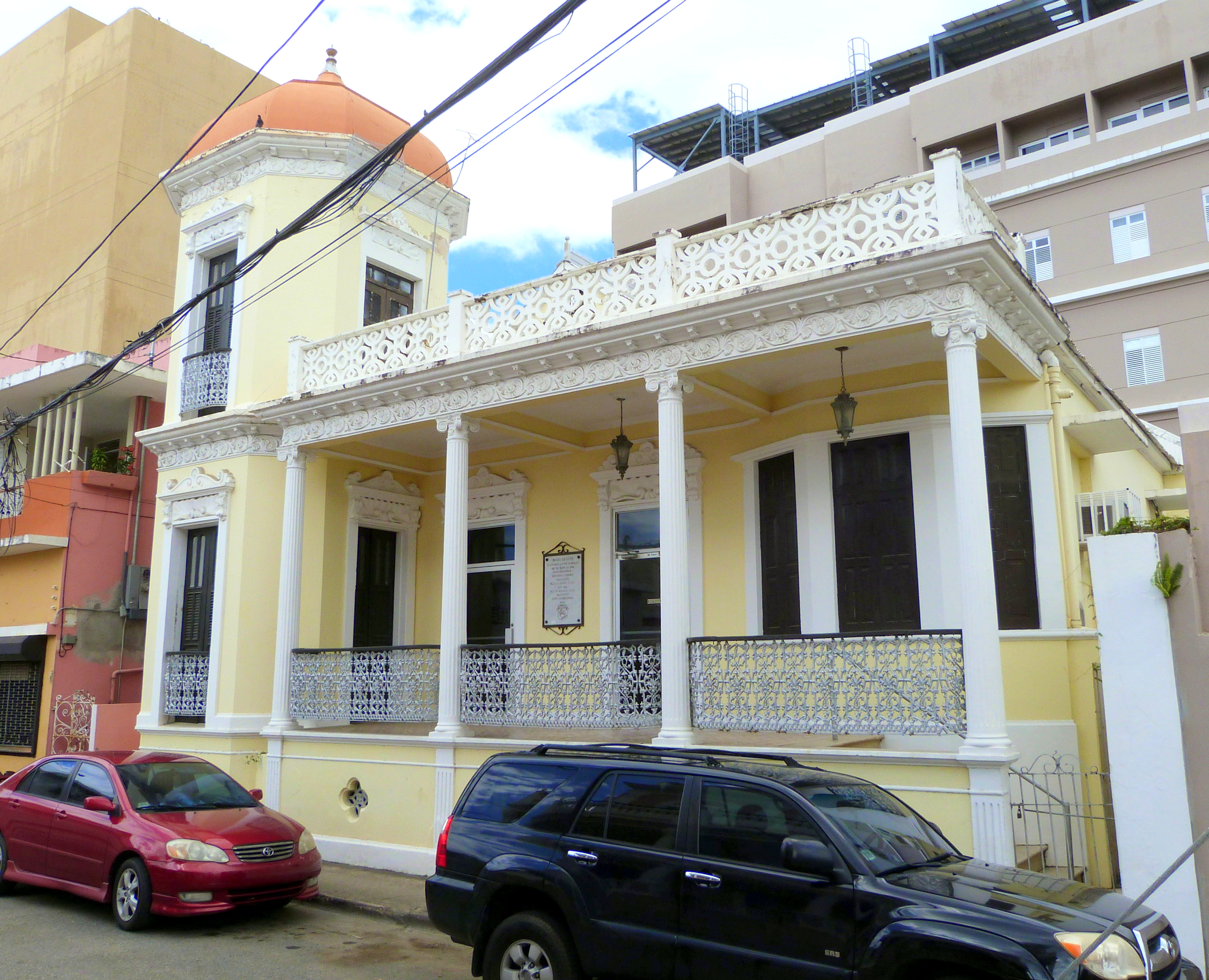
Cardona Residence (1913) in Aguadilla

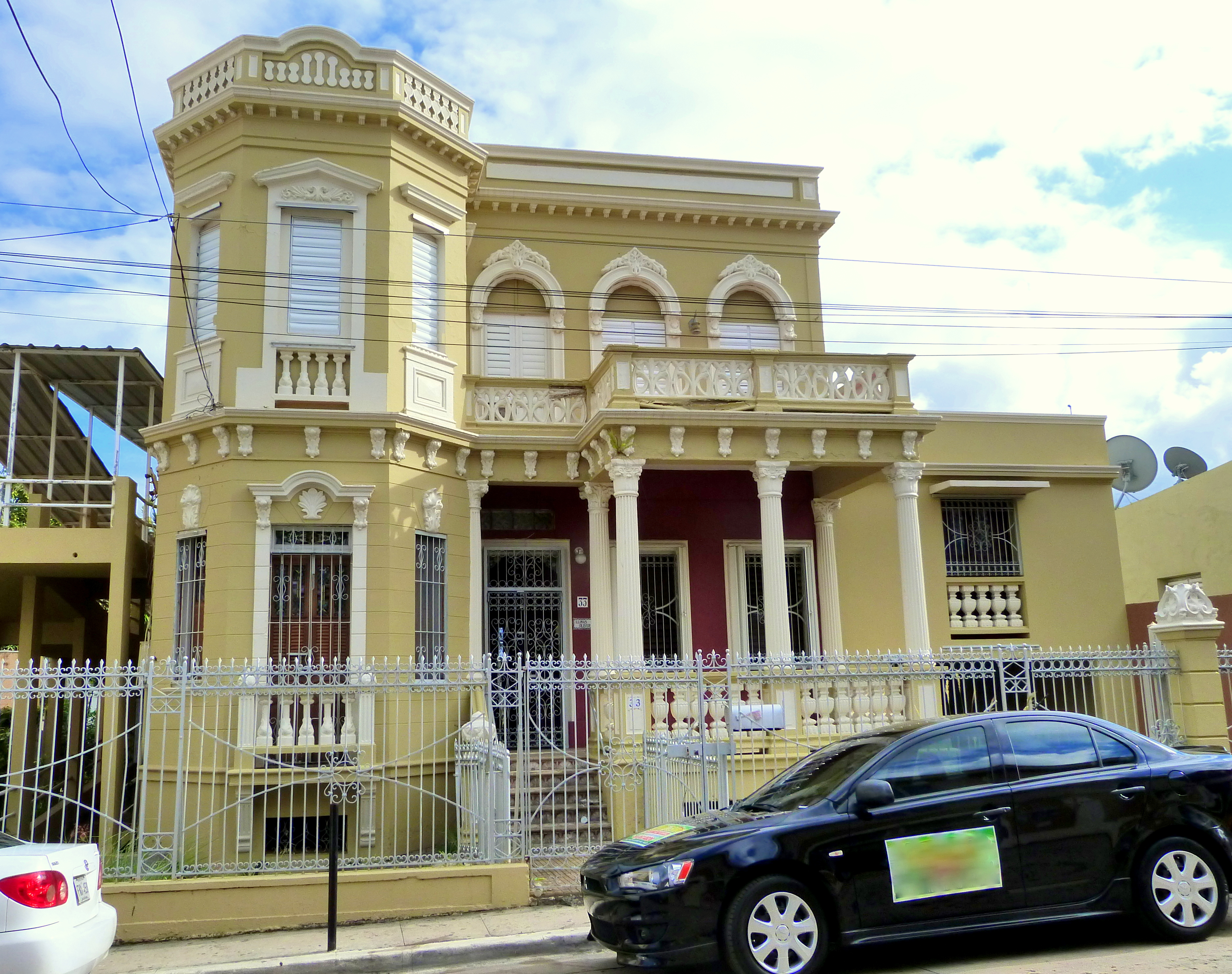
Chalet Amill (1914) in Yauco

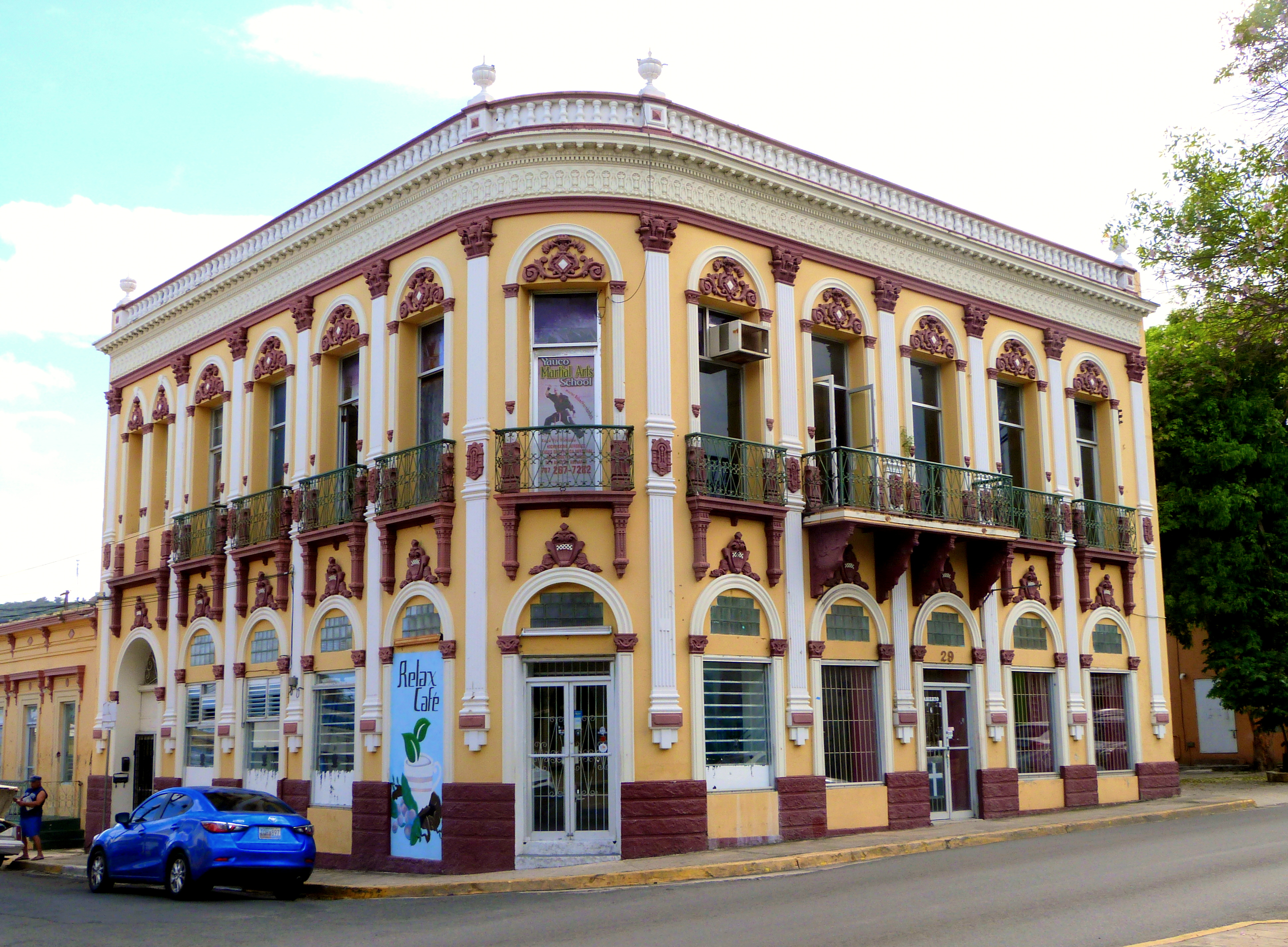
Filardi House (1916) in Yauco

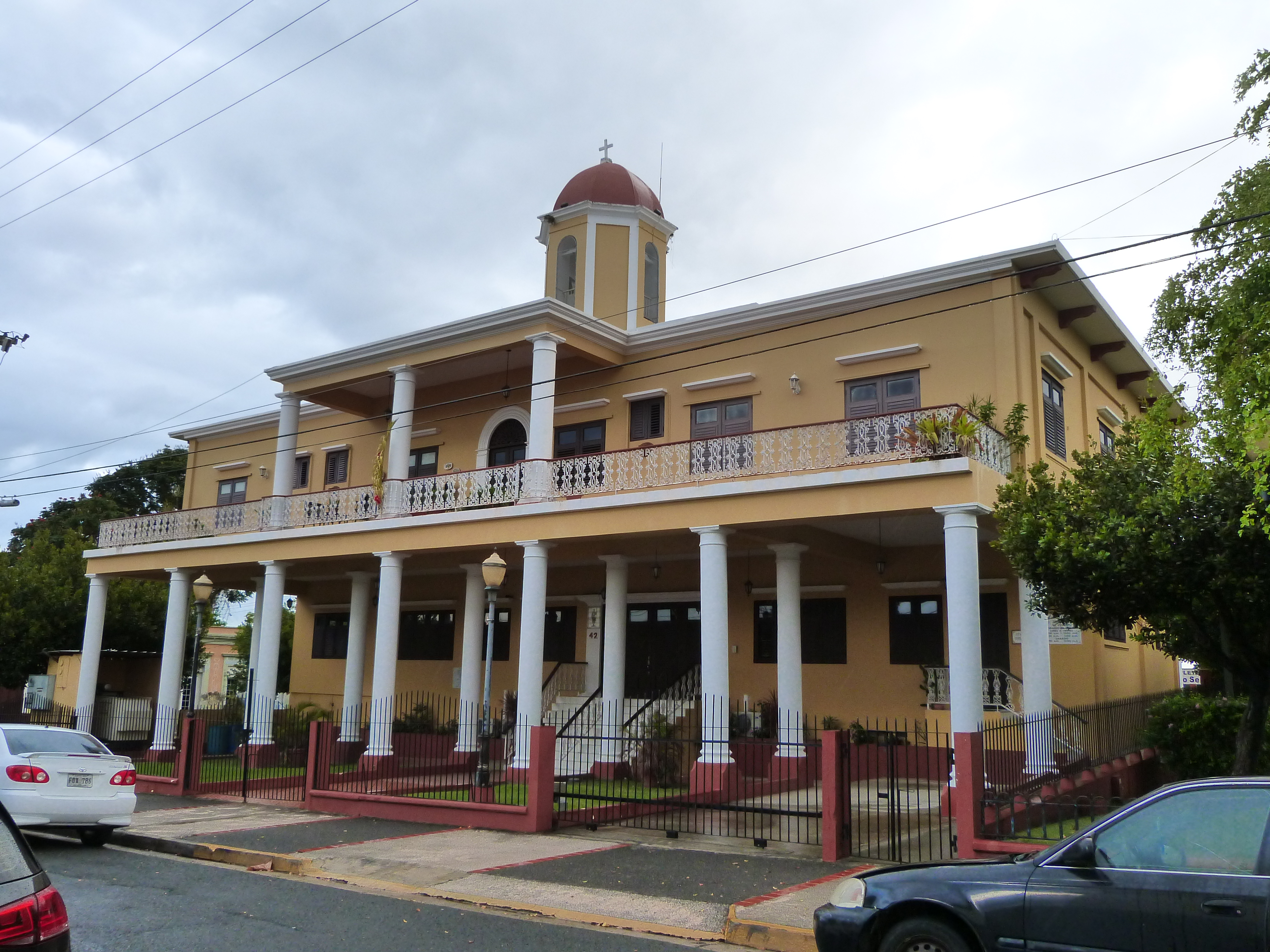
San Isidro Labrador Church parish house (1934) in Sabana Grande

==== Vieques Creole ====
The island of Vieques, located southeast of Puerto Rico, officially became part of Puerto Rico in 1811 (and a municipality in 1875). Its main settlement, Isabel II (named after Queen Isabella II), served as a useful regional hub of trade between Spain (Puerto Rico), France and Denmark (the Virgin Islands) at the time. The opening of the island for development and the Royal Decree of Graces of 1815 not only gave way to the European settlement of the island but also the official legalization of existing commerce developed by French settlers who were already living there. Many of these Franco-Viequenses, such as founder Teófilo José Jaime María Le Guillou, had already built their French Creole-inspired residences in town and across the island by the time it was officially founded as a municipality in 1875. As further Hispanic Puerto Ricans settlers came to Vieques, the French creole and Spanish criollo styles of vernacular architecture mixed to become the style now known as Vieques Creole (Criollo Viequense), which formally developed during the last decades of the 19th century and up to the 1910s. Many existing residences of this style are today listed in the United States National Register of Historic Places, such as the Rosendo Delerme, the Smaine–Ortiz, the Delerme–Anduze, and the Augusto Delerme houses.

==== Other 19th-century vernacular examples ====
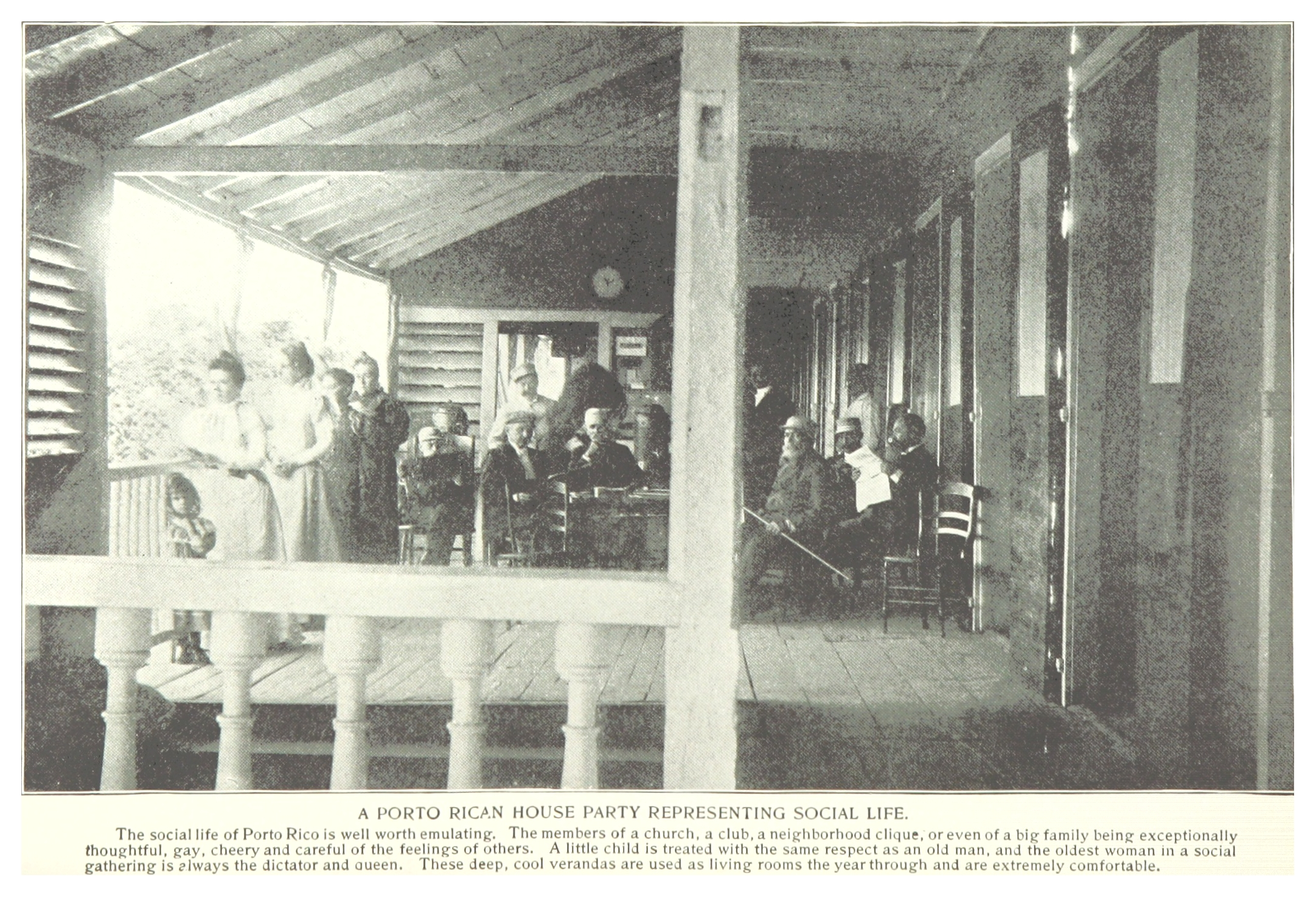
"These deep, cool verandas are used as living rooms the year through and are extremely comfortable." (c.1899)

As cities across Puerto Rico grew in size and commerce throughout the 19th-century vernacular styles in the countryside also developed both naturally and in direct inspiration by the urban trends of the time. Beyond the academically established characteristics of the previous two century, the trends at the time were mostly shaped by function, available materials and the tropical nature of the land. As with the previous centuries, two-room casas campesinas (rural houses) with bahareque (wattle and daub), palm board and/or rough-sawn planks were the most common residence among the jibaro social classes across the island. Roofing in these houses, however, evolved at the time with the accessibility to materials such as tile, previously only available to the higher classes. European immigrants from the French colonies also brought over the tradition of porches and verandas which added a new shaded area for both domestic work and leisure.

Further regional variation in vernacular architecture also appeared at the time, with mountain coffee-regions often giving way to higher house foundations and more prominent eaves built to cope with steep slopes and heavy rainfall, respectively, and raised base floors in coastal sugarcane-growing regions to help cope with flood and pests. The latter were often produced more elaborate wooden houses, with steward (mayordomo) house adapting rustic yet subtly elegant decorations inspired in the plantation owner manorial houses. As with the Ponce Creole architecture, many of these vernacular homes began to incorporate French and Art Nouveau-inspired ornamentations during the turn of the century. These vernacular trends further echoed back into the urban areas, particularly in the smaller mountain downtowns (pueblos) along the Cordillera Central, with working-class residential structures displaying these eclectic characteristics by the beginning of the 20th century and beyond.

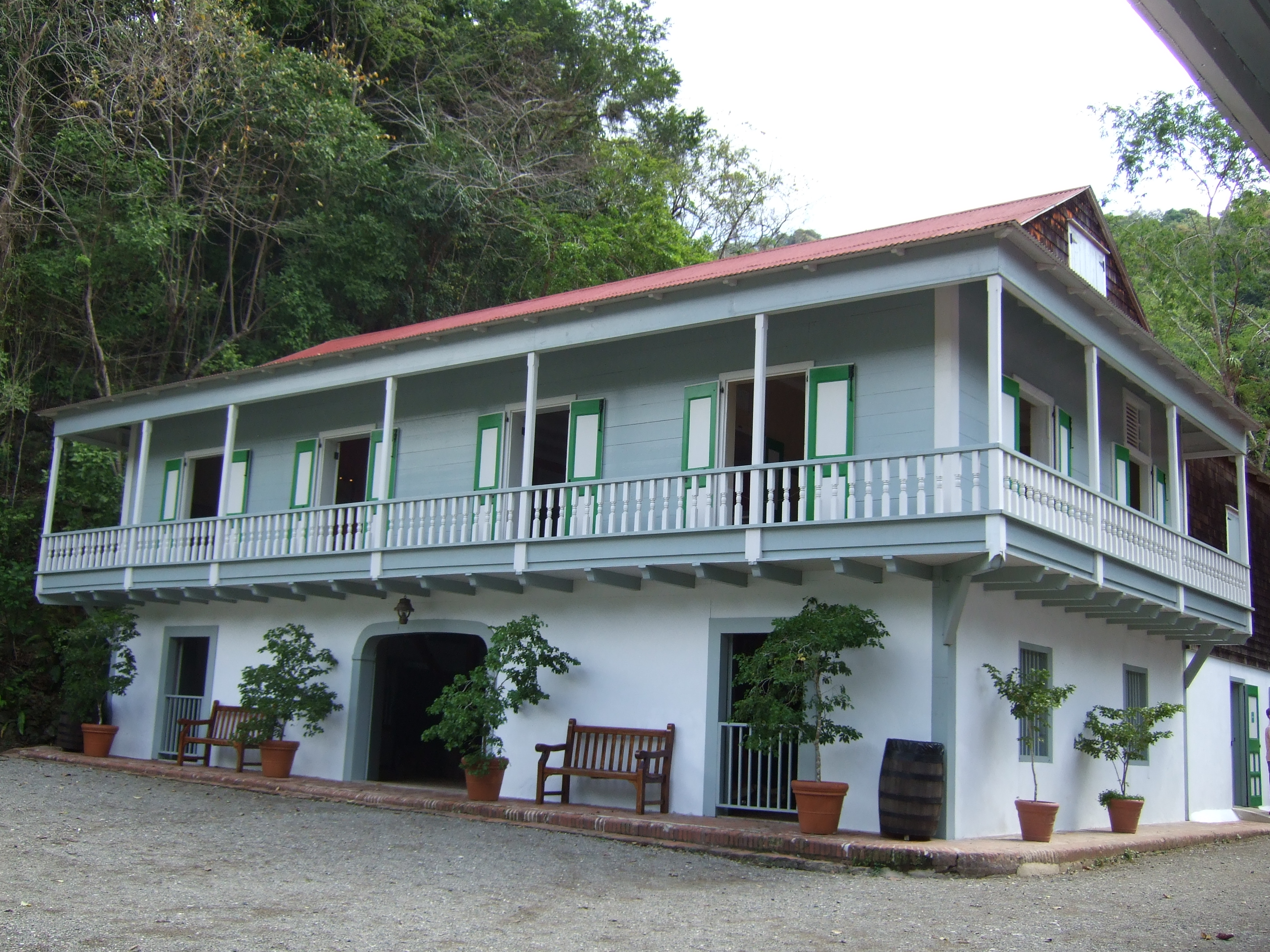
Hacienda Buena Vista (1833) in Ponce

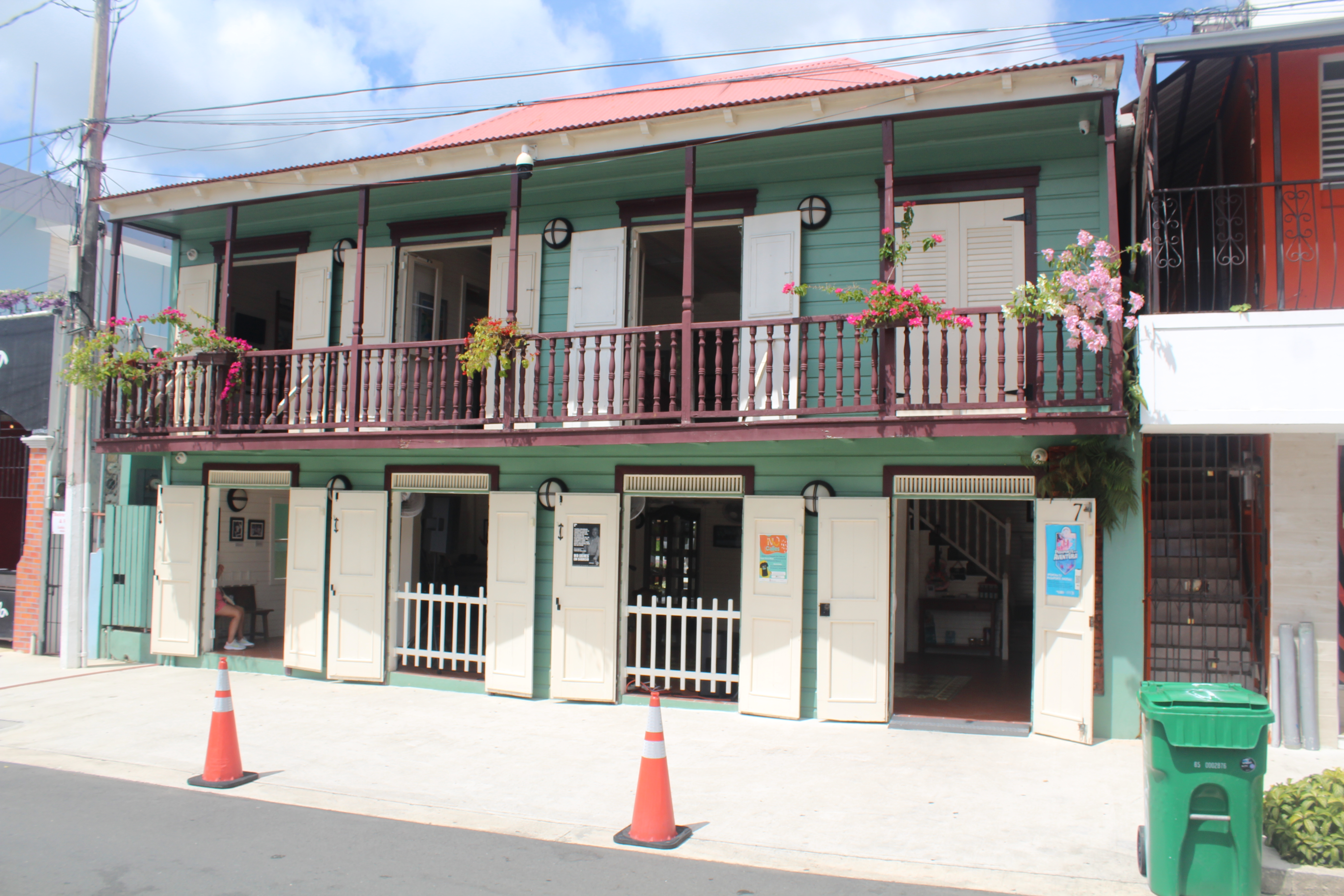
Rodríguez Morales House (1850) in Cayey

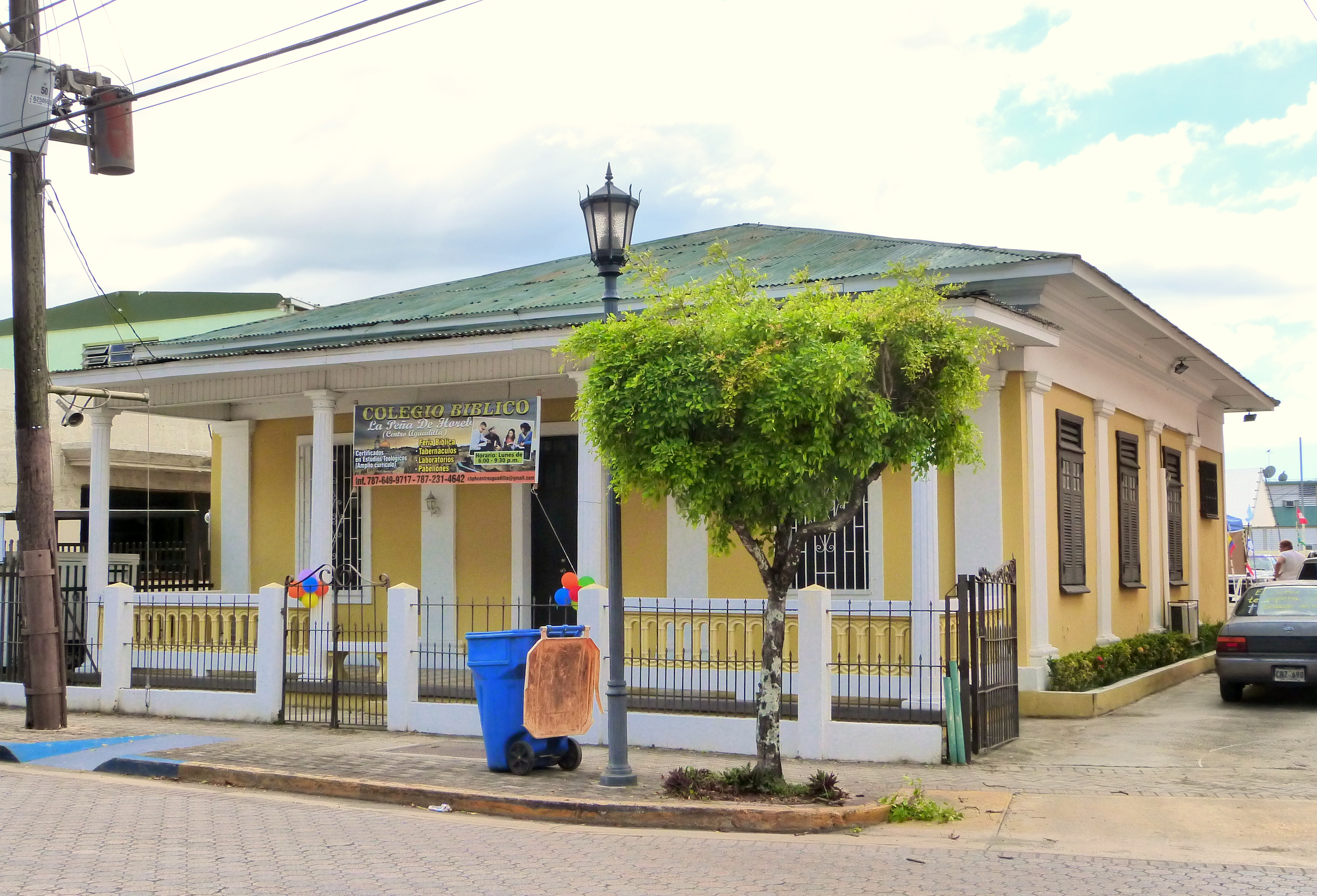
Amparo Roldán House (1875) in Aguadilla

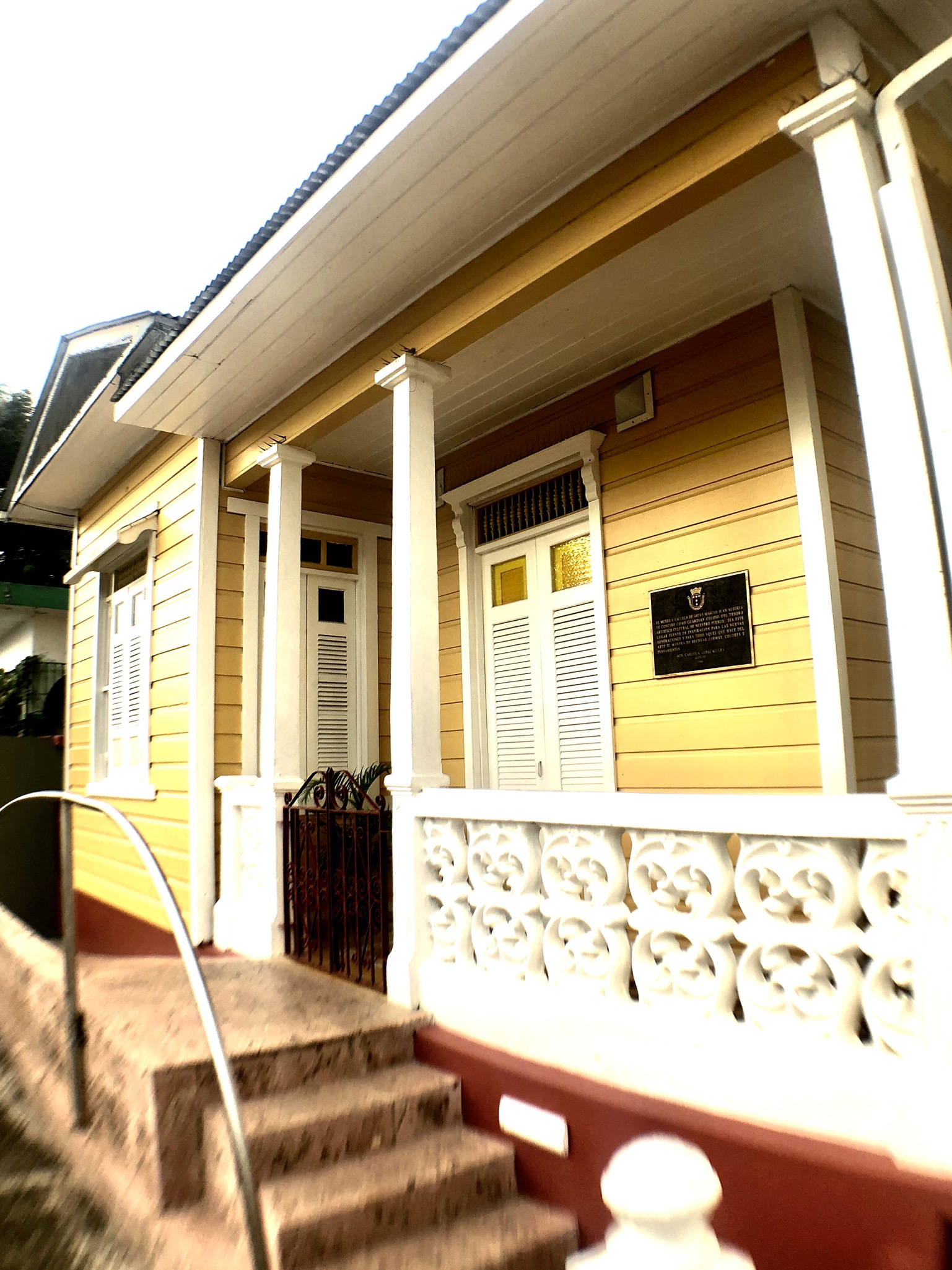
Don Andrés Hernández House (1880) in Dorado

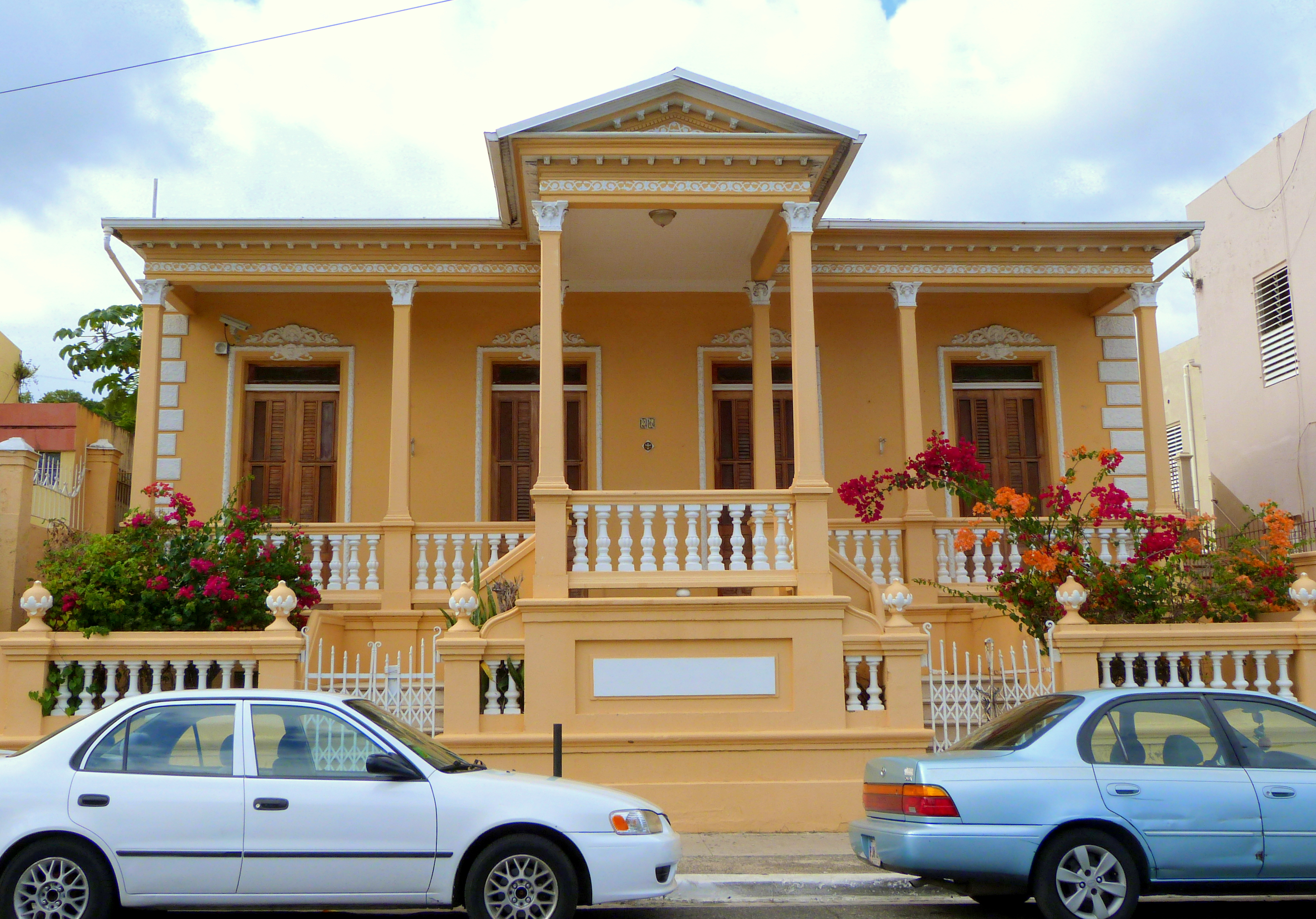
González Vivaldi House (1880) in Yauco

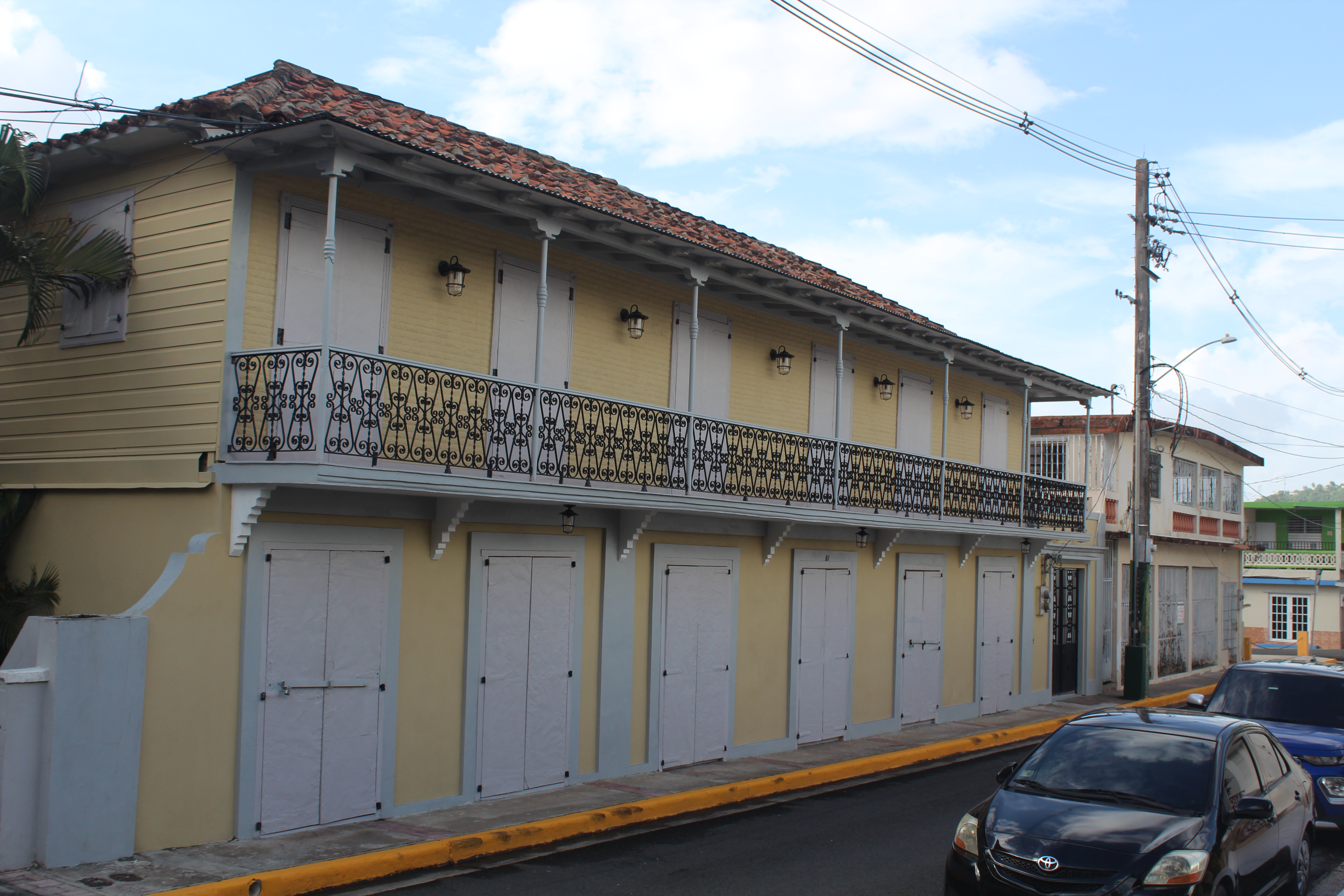
Machín–Ramos House (1883) in San Lorenzo

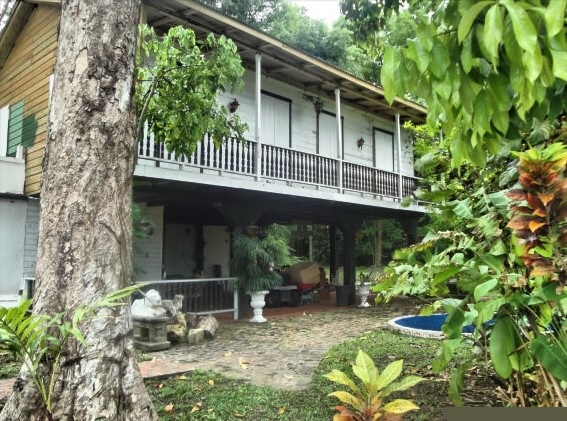
Hacienda Enriqueta (1884) in Moca

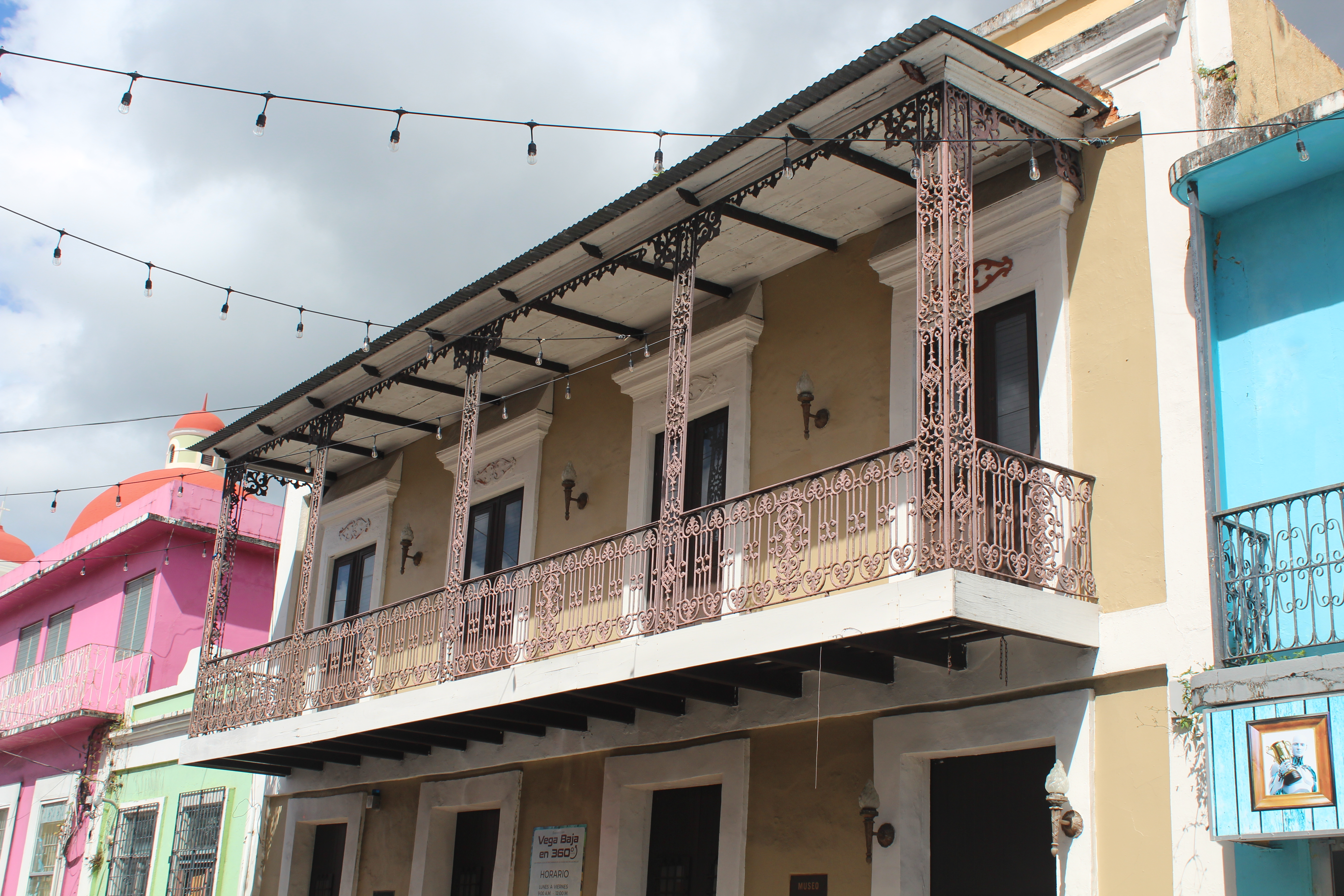
Alonso House (1890) in Vega Baja

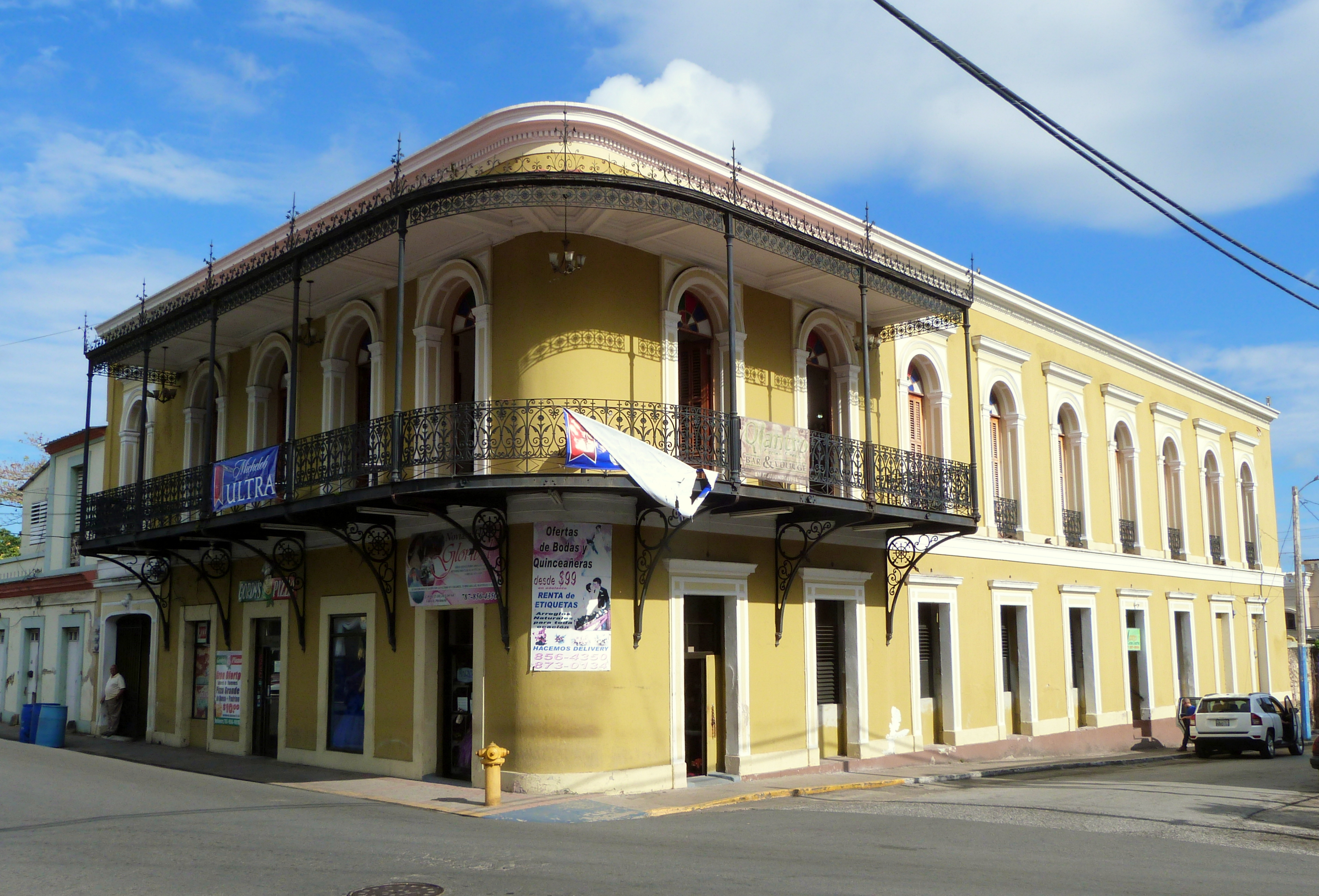
Césari House (1893) in Yauco

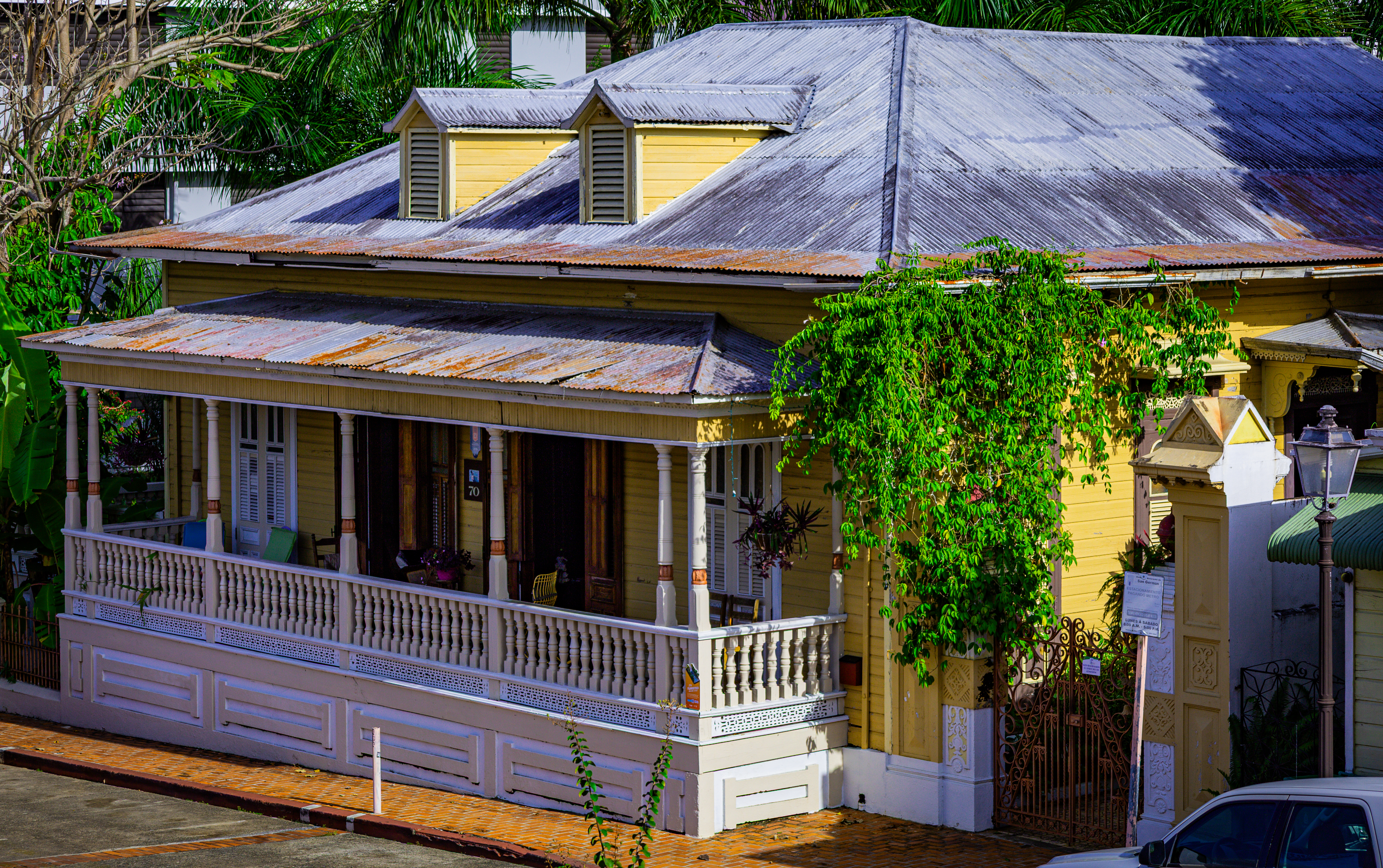
Jaime Acosta y Fores House (1917) in San Germán

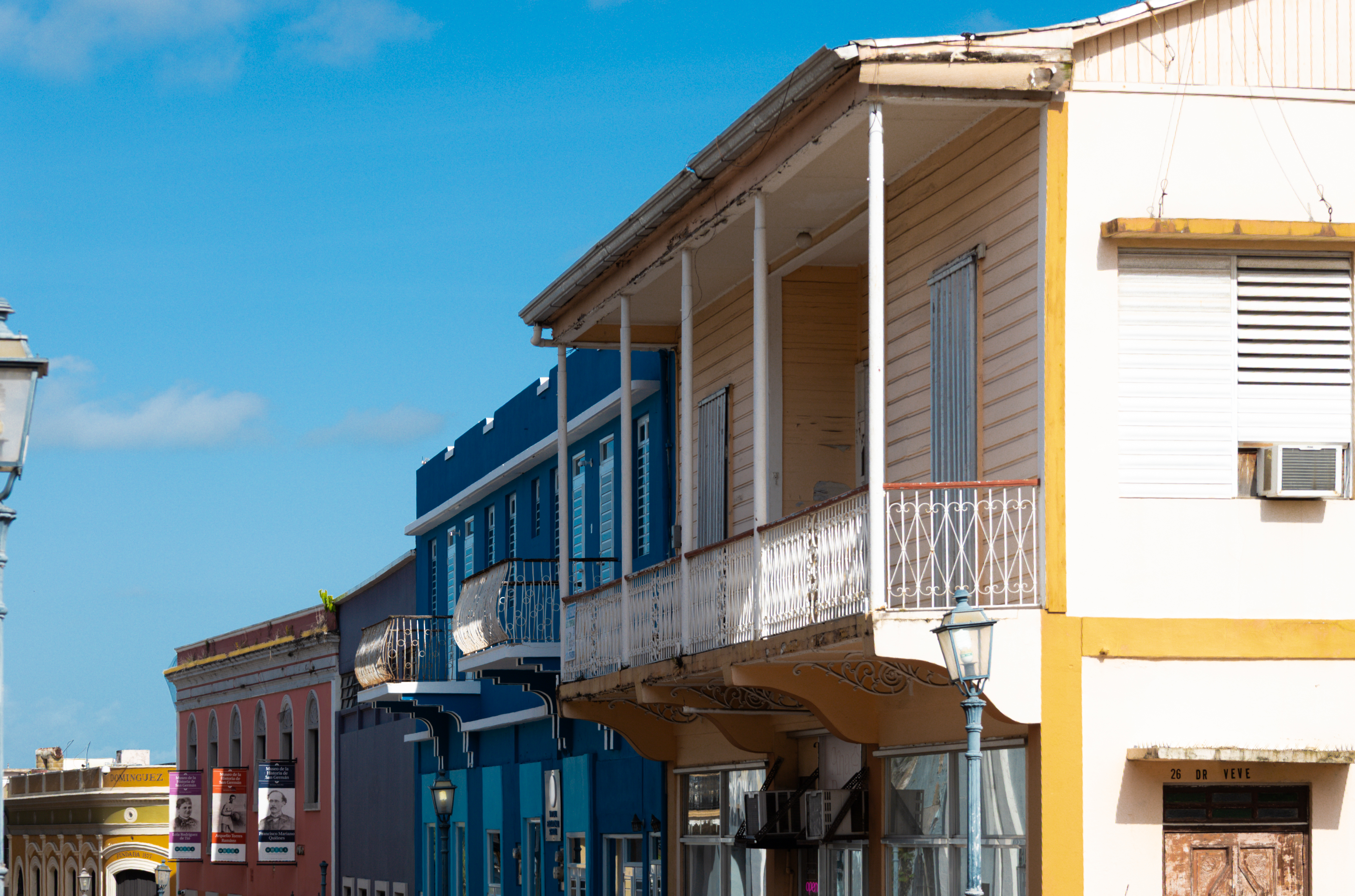
Vernacular 19th and 20th century houses of San Germán Historic District

== Early 20th century ==
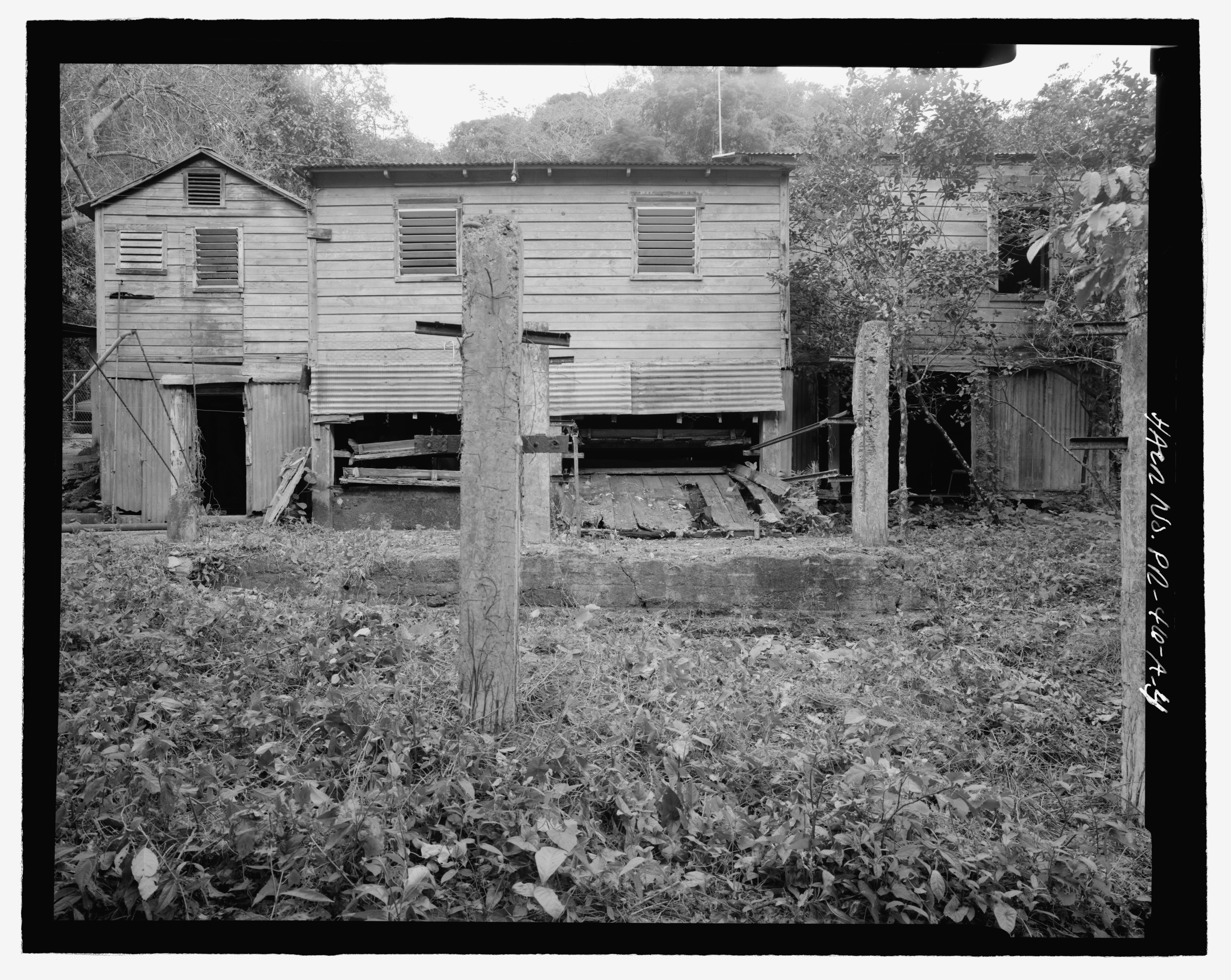
Use of zinc in 20th-century vernacular architecture in Maragüez, Ponce

As with its culture and history, the aftermath of the Spanish–American War naturally marked a remarkable turning point for Puerto Rican architecture in the 20th century. The colonial Military Government of Porto Rico rapidly introduced "Americanization" planning models and construction materials that reflected North American standards never before seen in the Hispanic territory. Advances in the hot-dip galvanization process of zinc during the second half of the previous century, for example, now provided accessible metal roofing for residences throughout the island. These construction and urban planning parameters were soon tested, first in the aftermath of the 1899 San Ciriaco hurricane, and then in the outcome of the 1918 Aguadilla earthquake. Municipal governments and newly established United States institutions sponsored the construction of courthouses, schools and infrastructure projects that reflected the Beaux-Arts planning principles, classical symmetry and the sanitary urban ideals of the Progressive Era. Architecturally, the United States introduced their own revivalist and historicist styles of construction in the development of these government buildings, libraries, schools and other social and civic constructions in San Juan and the rest of the island.

=== Arts and Crafts movement ===
At the time of the annexation of Puerto Rico under the jurisdiction of the United States, the city of Chicago was in the middle of a period of architectural flourishing that had attracted architects and artists from all over the world. One of these architects was Antonin Nechodoma, a Czech-born immigrant and disciple of Frank Lloyd Wright who moved from Chicago to Puerto Rico in 1905 to work in the construction of new American-sponsored banks, schools and even churches. One of his earliest projects in the island was the McCabe Memorial Church in Ponce, built for the growing Methodist population in the city in 1908, gained him widespread attention throughout Puerto Rico and the Caribbean. The use of local materials and artisanal craftsmanship in the construction of this church was an example of the time's response to the drastic industrialization of the previous century. The American Craftsman movement proved compatible and popular with the local architectural interests of the time, particularly in the construction of residences, and it was therefore further absorbed into the vernacular Ponce Creole trends of the 1910s. A great example of a residence of this time is the Miguel C. Godreau House, built in Ponce in 1919, it was heavily inspired by the California bungalows of cities like Berkeley while also incorporating the eclectic elements of Ponce Creole. The American Craftsman continue to be used in middle class single-family houses, and in other state and federal-sponsored projects, such as in the New Deal Era constructions in the forest reserves of the 1930s and 1940s.

Bungalow/Craftsman in Puerto Rico

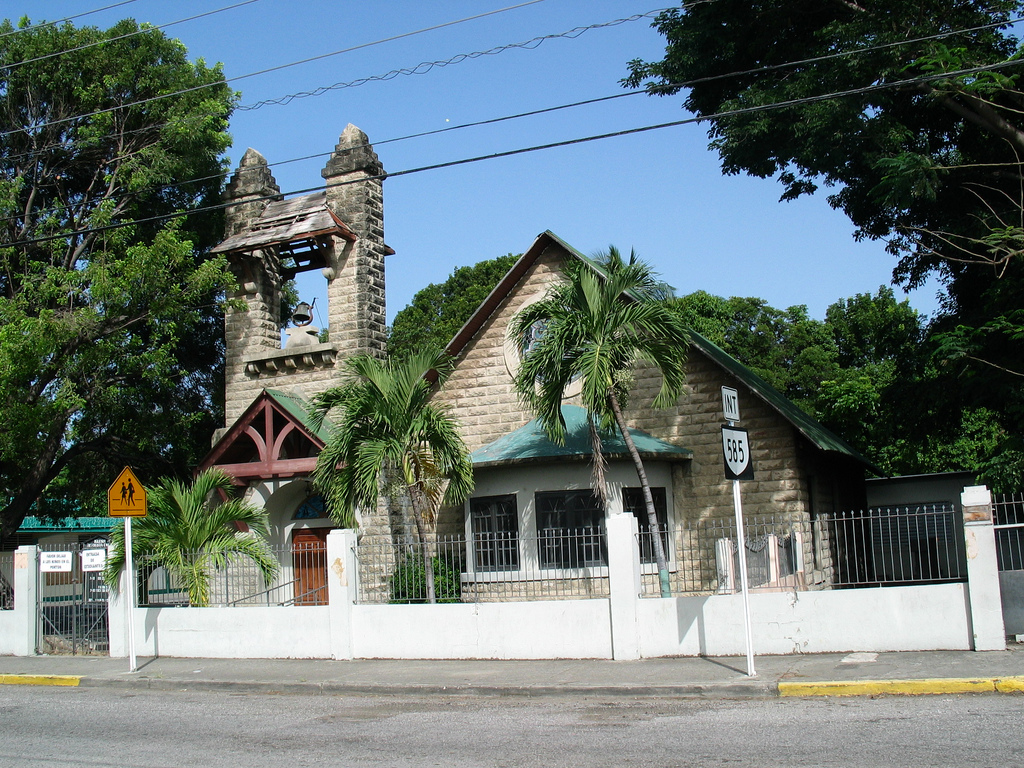
McCabe Memorial Church (1908) in Ponce

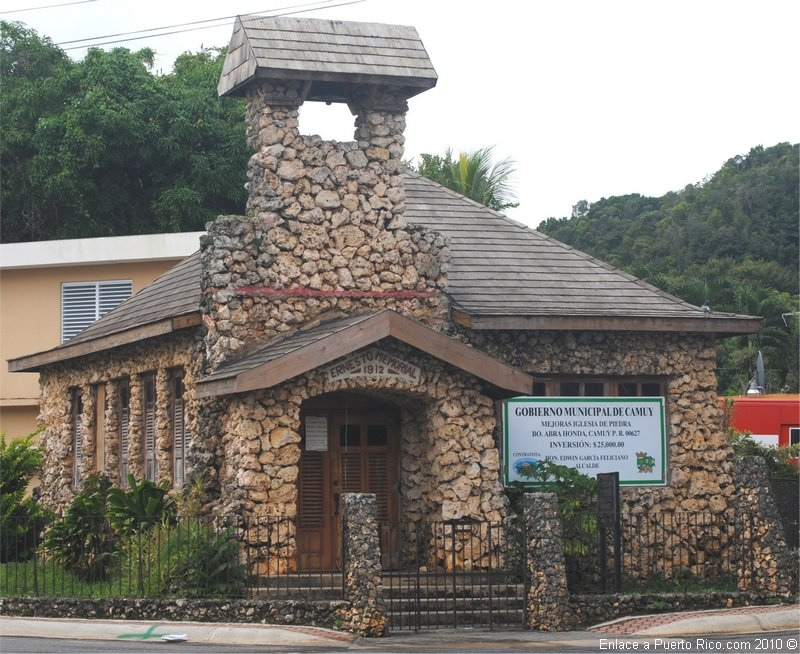
Ernesto Memorial Chapel (1912) in Camuy

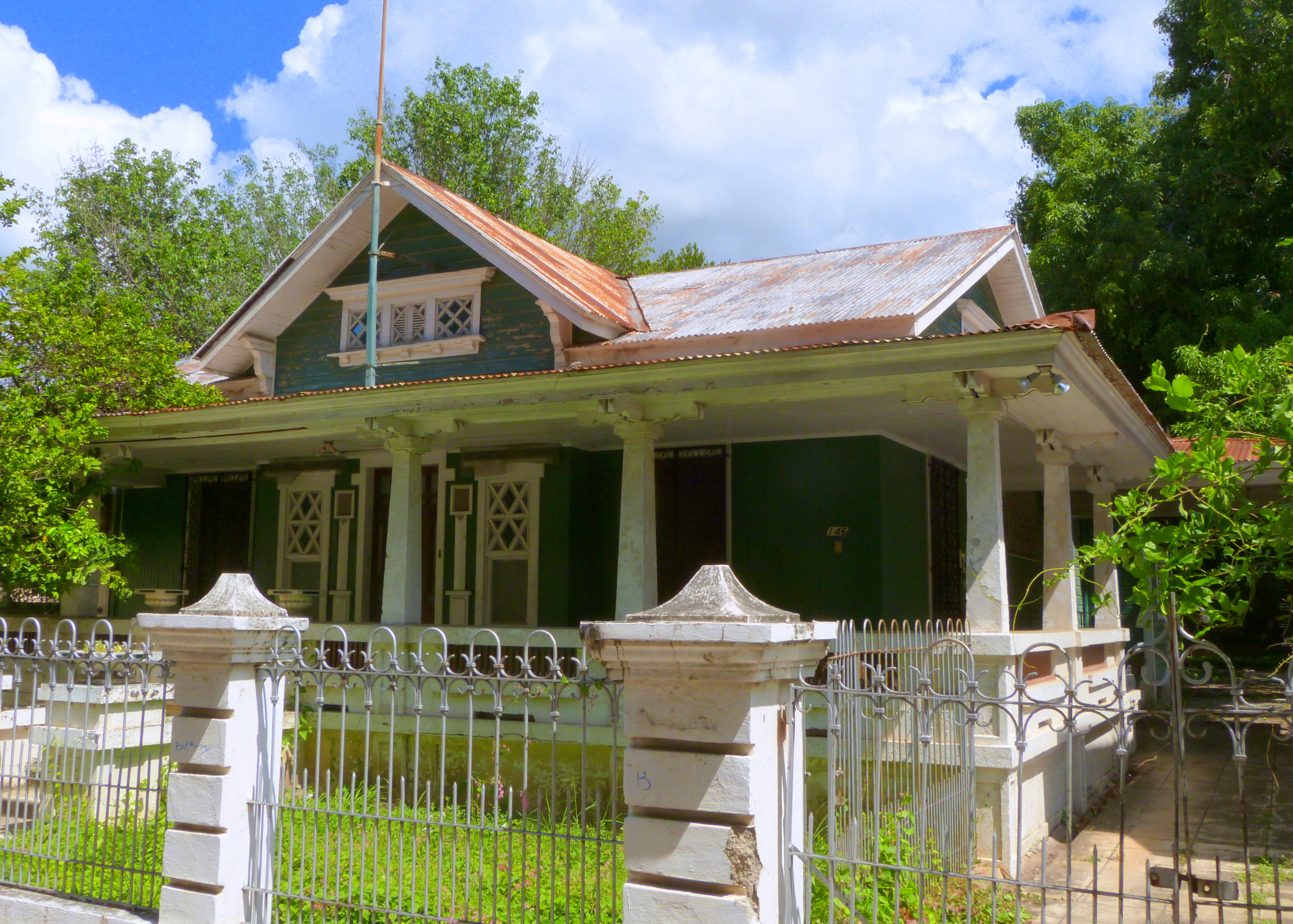
Miguel C. Godreau House (1919) in Ponce

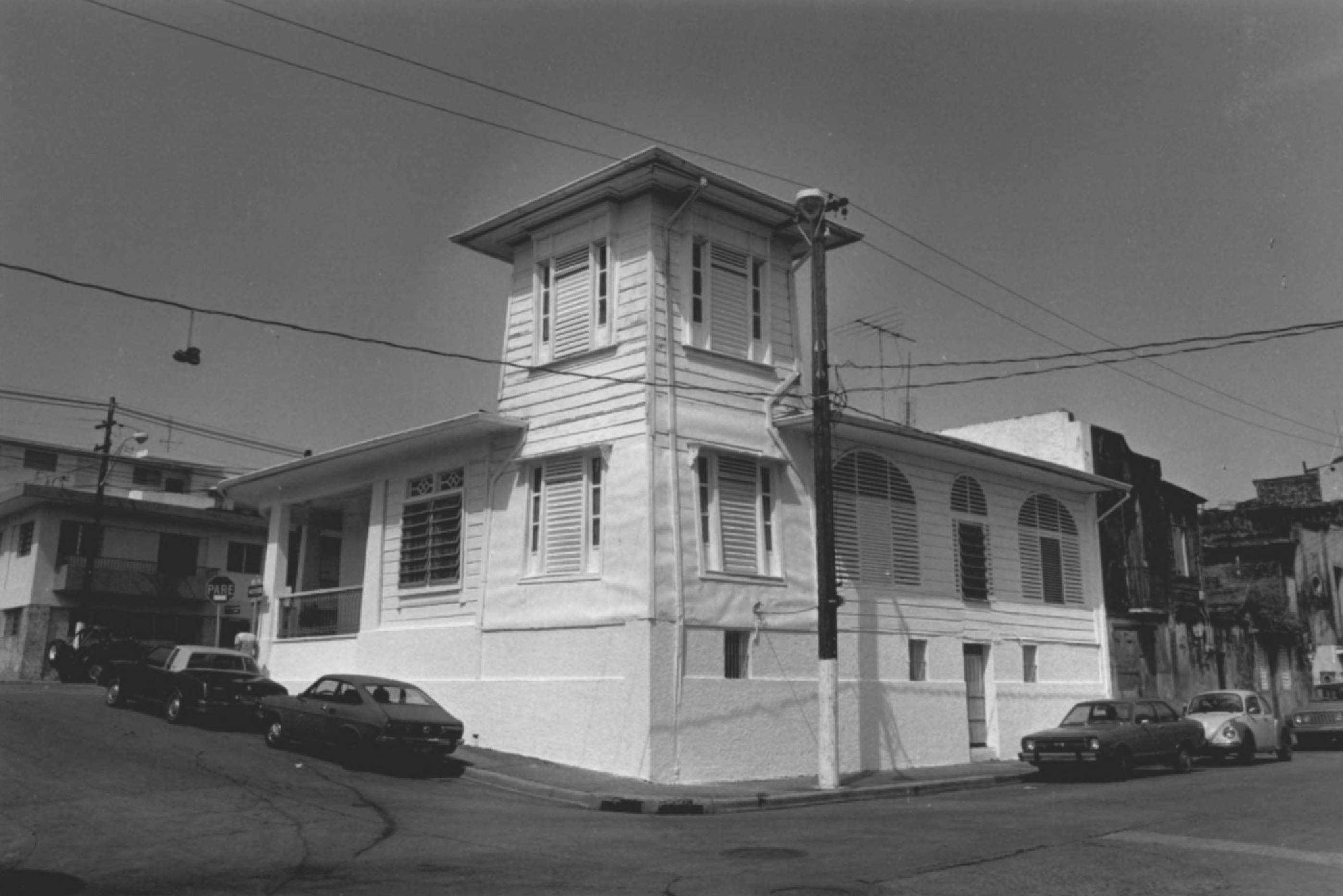
Ramírez Fuentes House (1925) in Mayagüez

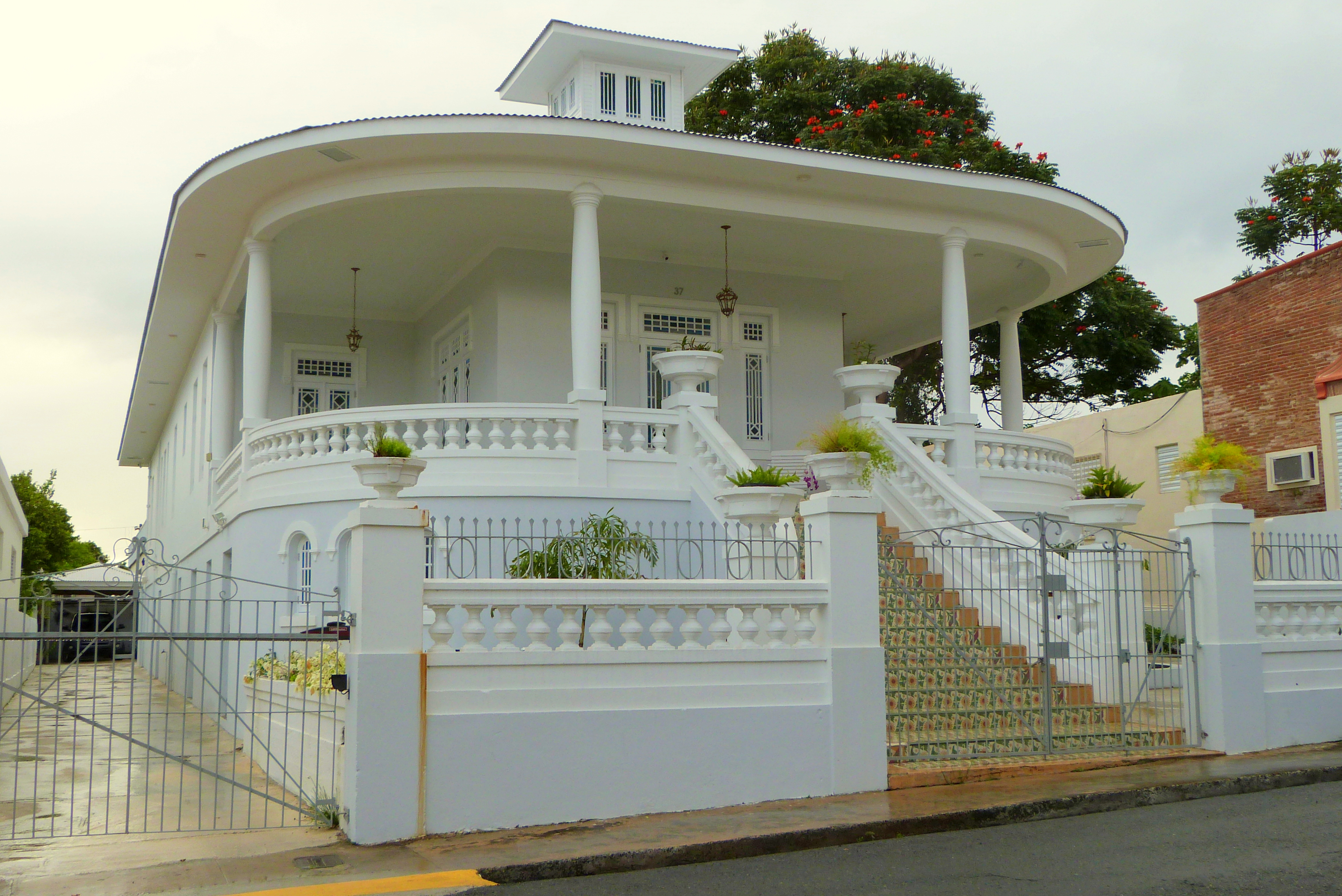
Berta Sepulveda House (1927) in Sabana Grande

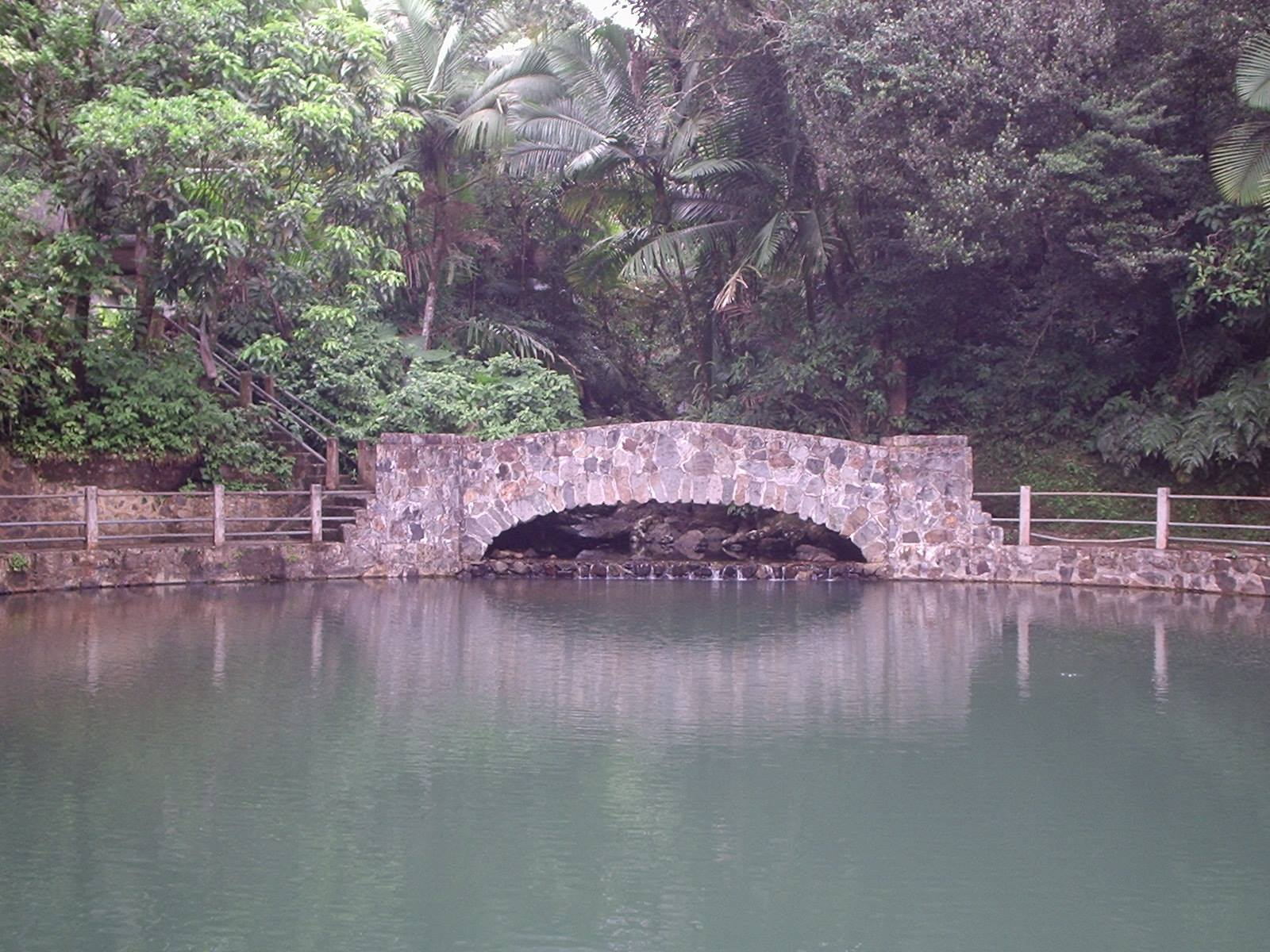
Baño Grande (1938) in El Yunque National Forest

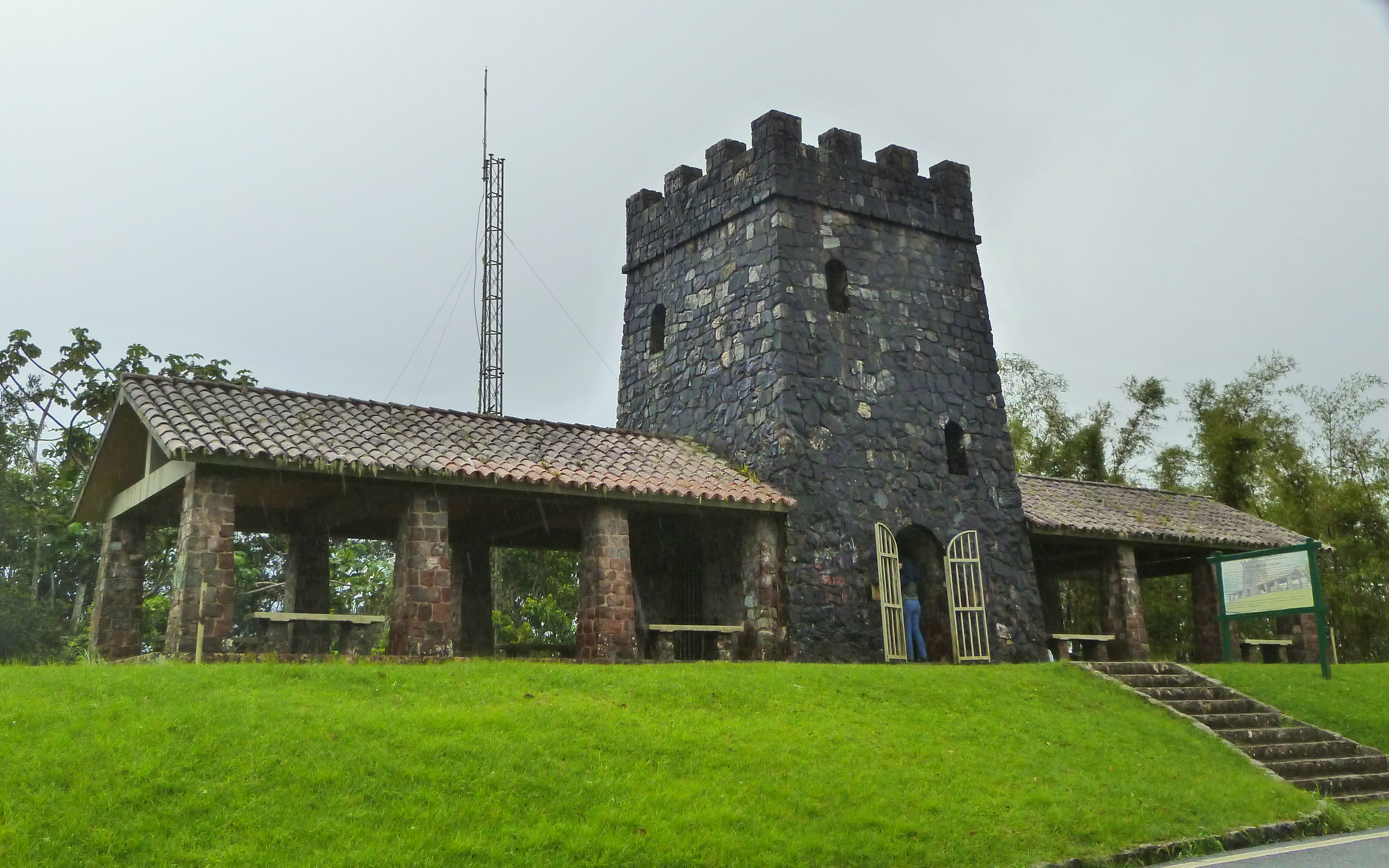
Santa Ana Observation Tower (1940) in Maricao State Forest

Just like with the American Craftsman movement, the Prairie School of architecture also greatly influenced the construction of single-family houses throughout Puerto Rico. Architect Antonin Nechodoma was once again one of the main proponents of this architectural style in the island, working in projects for both American businessmen and prominent Puerto Rican sugarcane industrialists in cities such as San Juan and Humacao. The architecture and design of more house projects in cities such as Ponce and Mayagüez also took notable inspiration in the Prairie School while incorporating elements of the Ponce Creole style, with the Francisco Porrata Doría-designed Fernando Luis Toro House being one of the clearer examples of this trend.

Prairie School in Puerto Rico

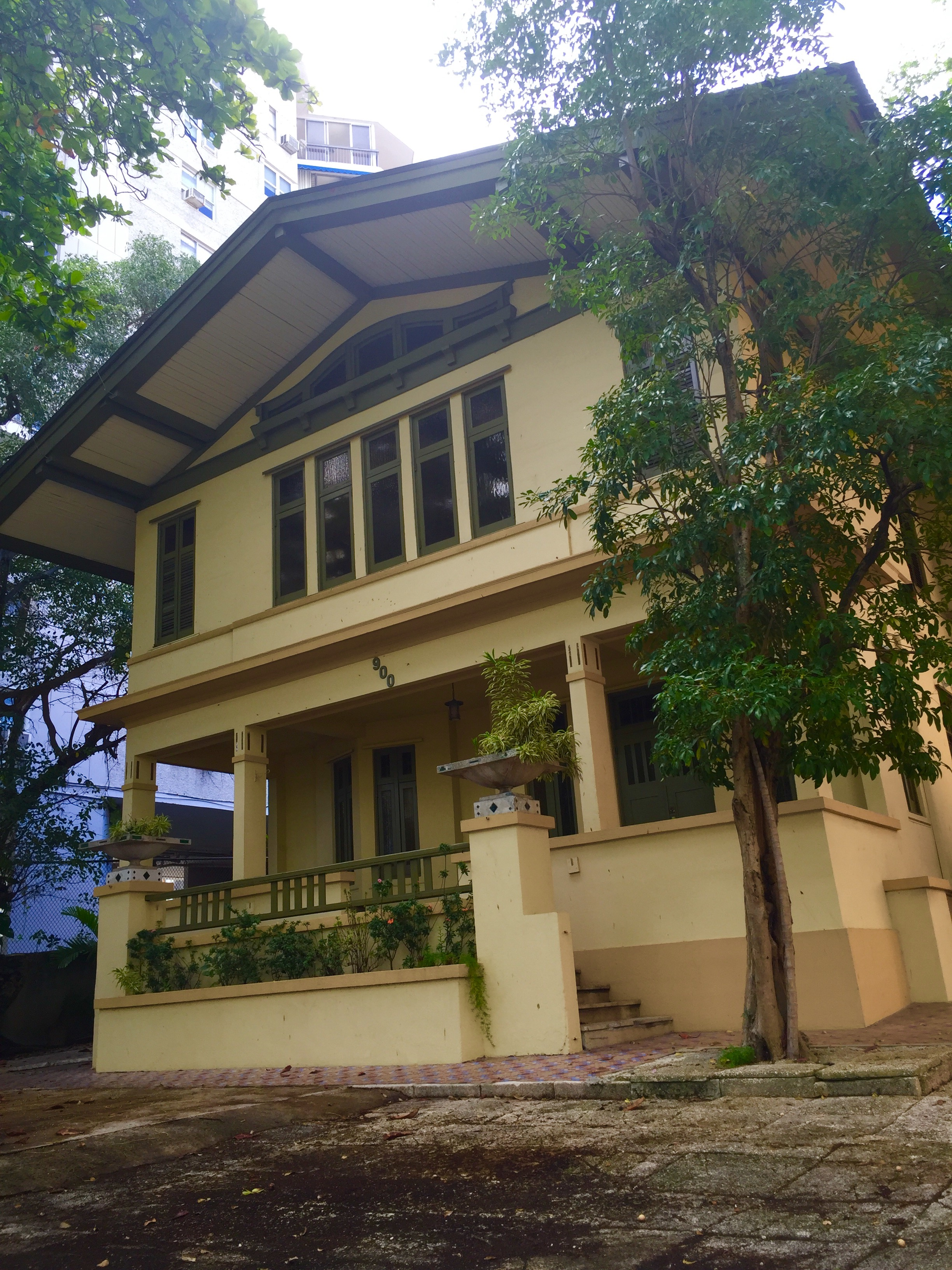
Aboy House (1912) in Santurce

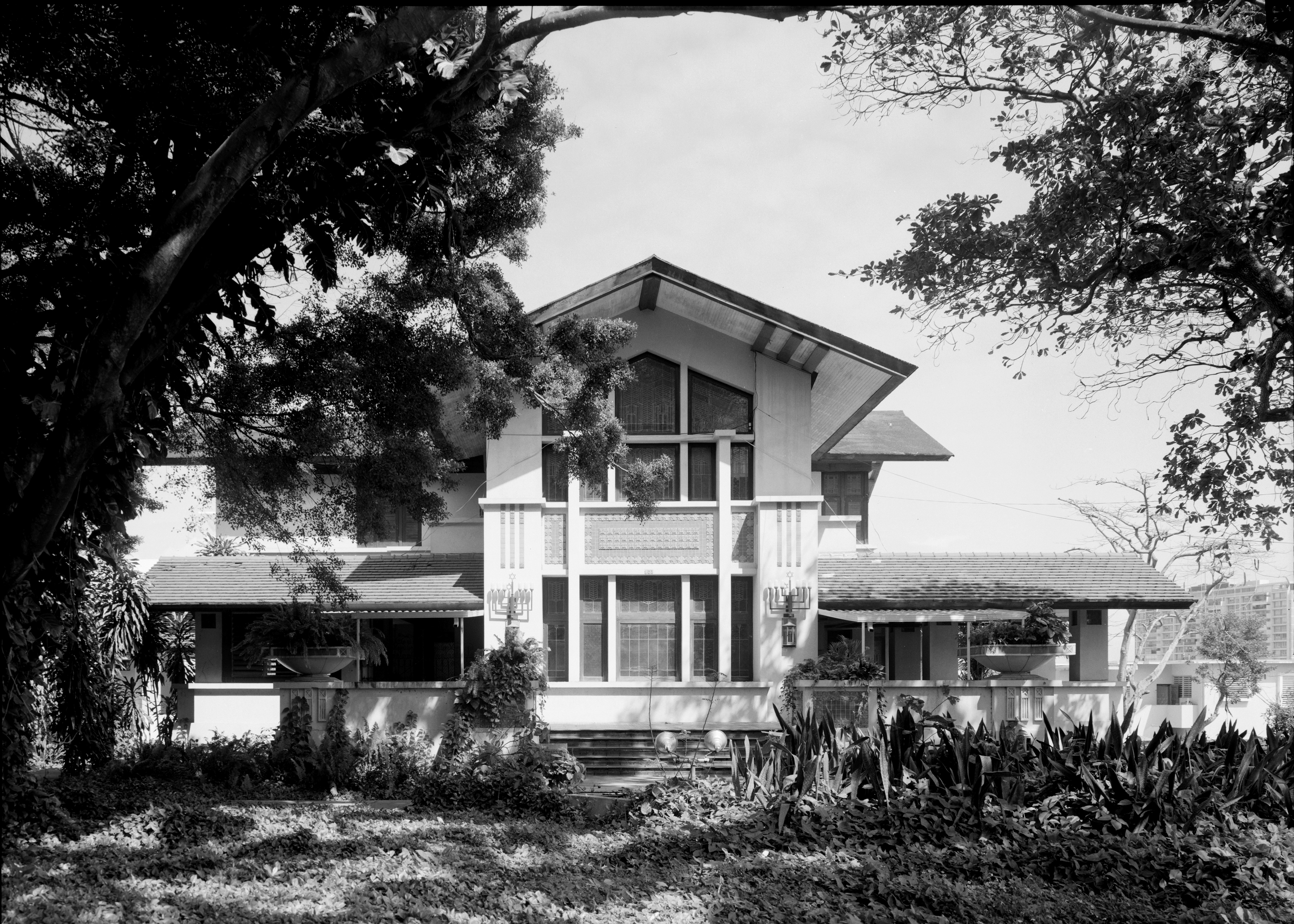
Korber House (1917) in Santurce

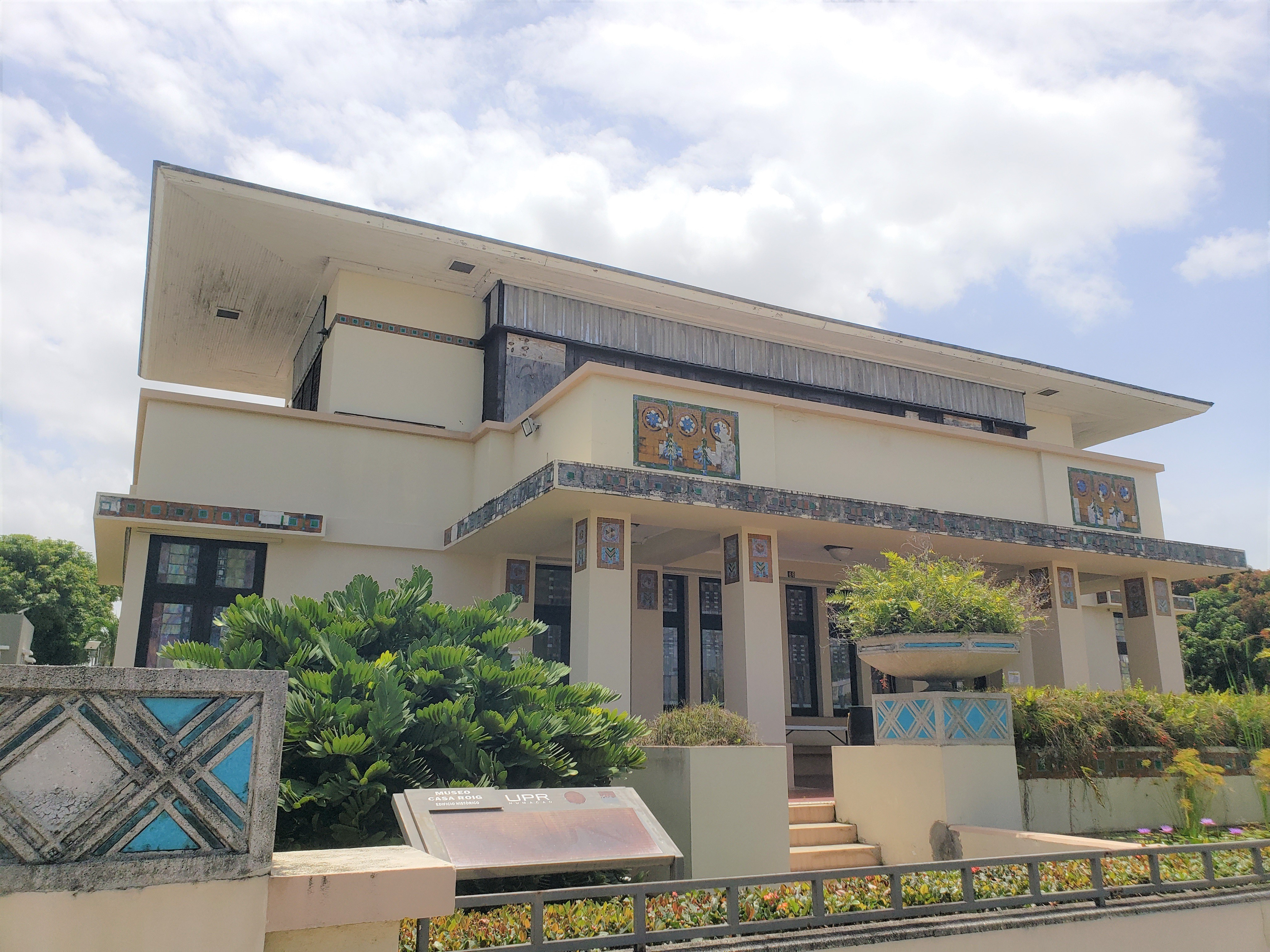
Roig House (1920) in Humacao

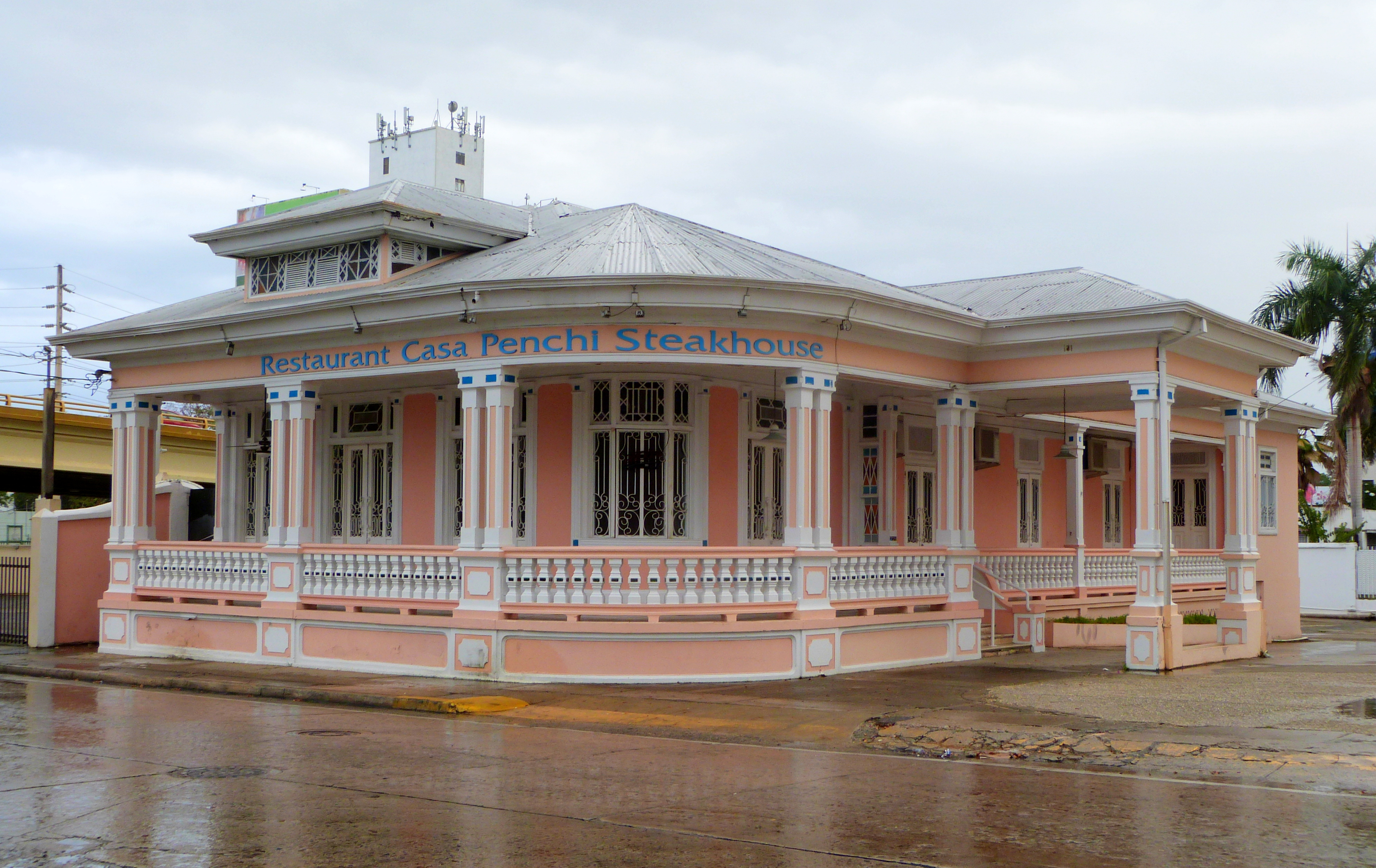
Duran Esmoris House (1921) in Mayagüez

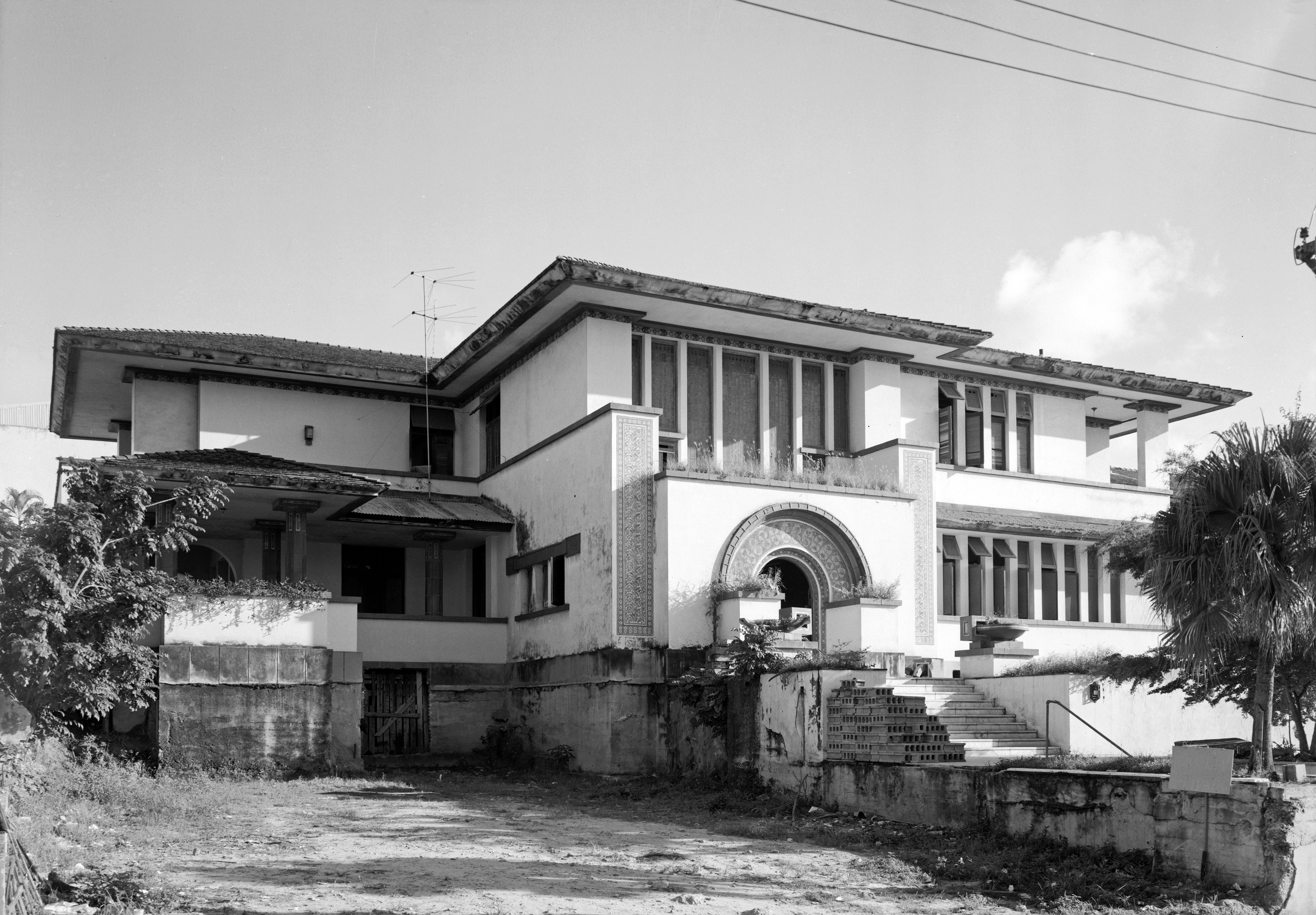
Giorgetti House (1923) in Santurce

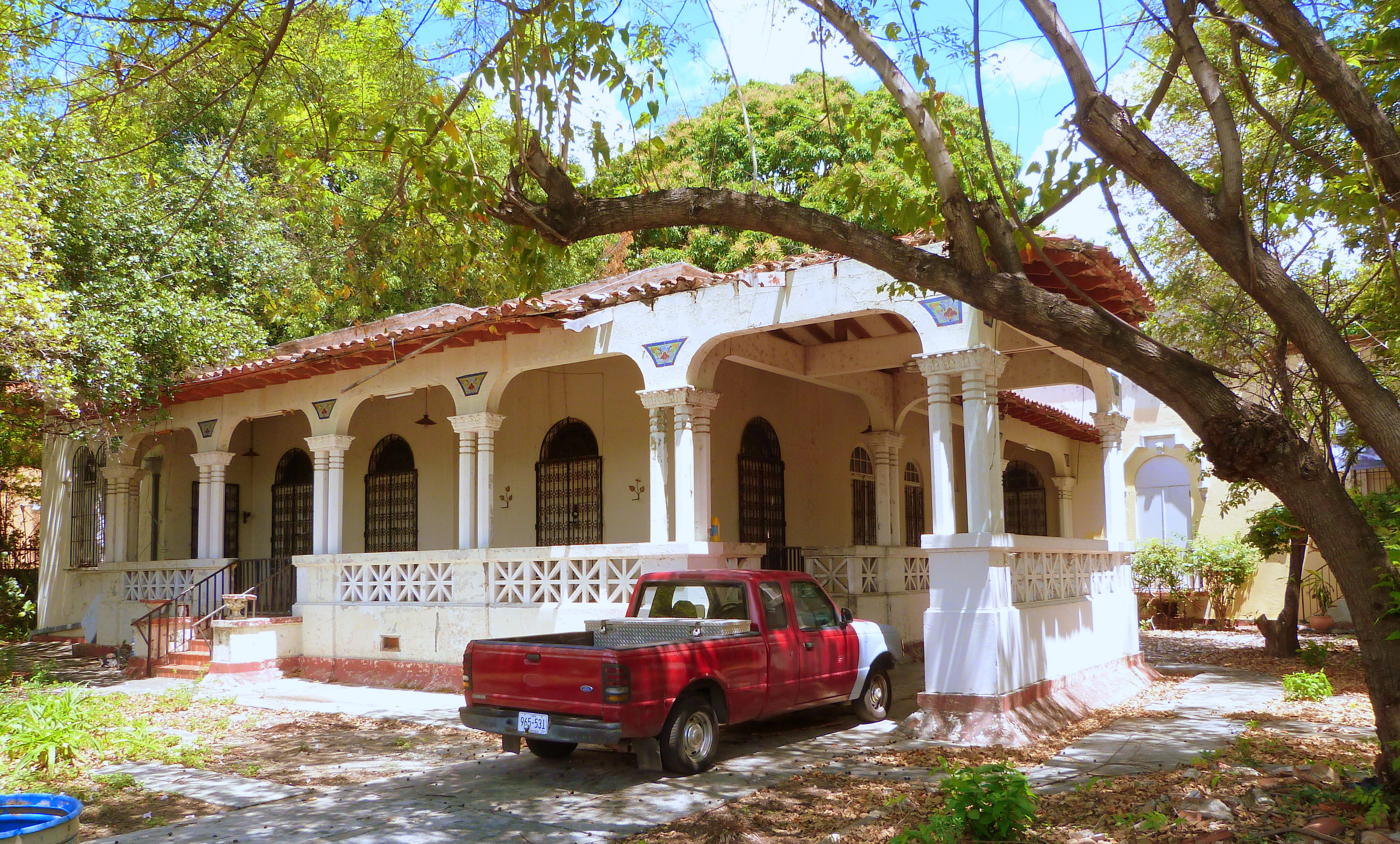
Fernando Luis Toro House (1927) in Ponce

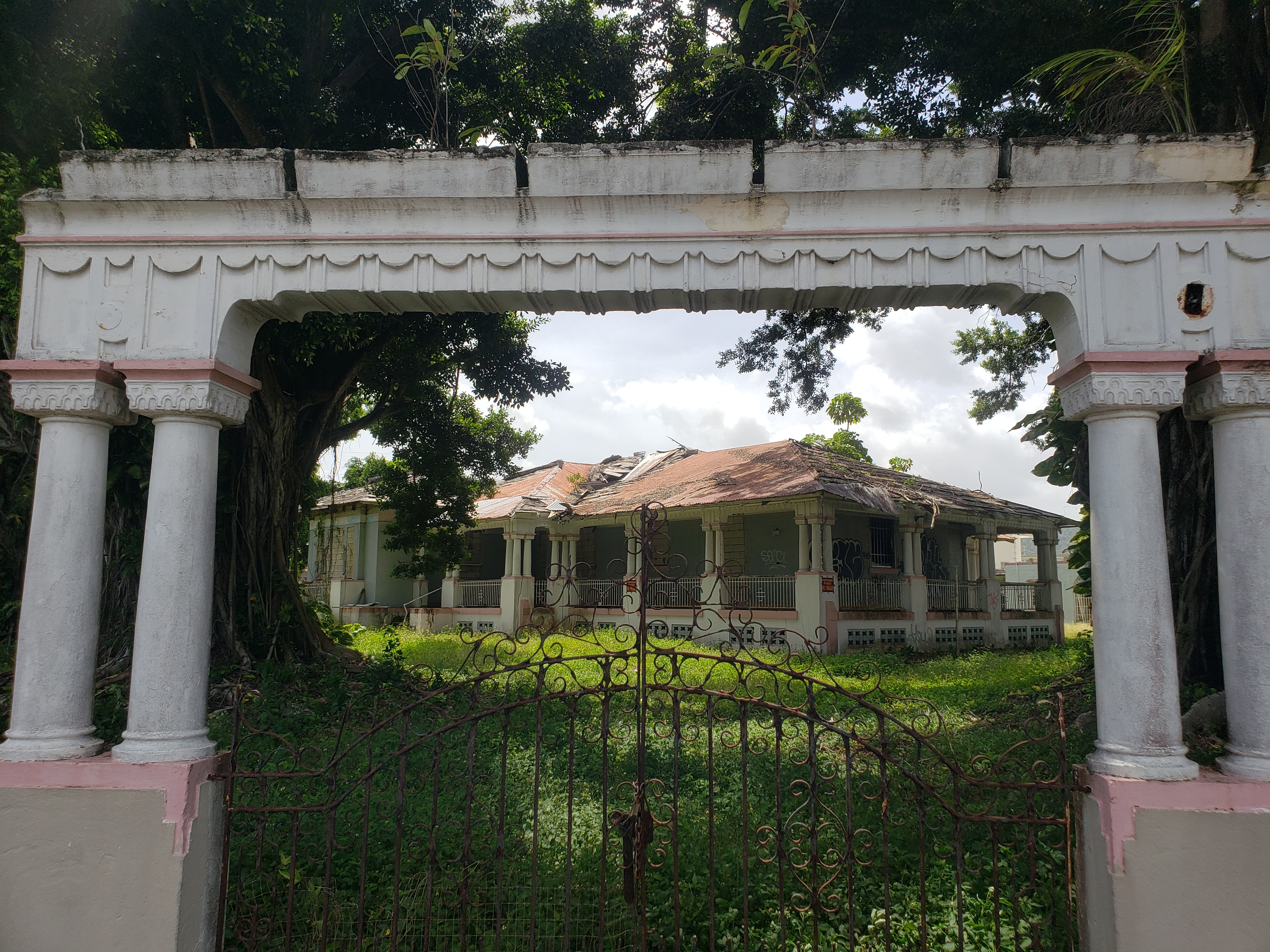
Palmira López de Pereyó House (1930) in Humacao

=== 20th century Revivalism ===
The Beaux-Arts traditions of the Progressive Era perfectly blended the Hispanic and American Classical Revival styles that defined the state-sponsored construction projects of the first decades of the 20th century. These civic buildings were often designed with symmetrical façades, columned porticoes and pedimented entrances that conveyed the belief of using architecture and design as a tool for moral dignity and social uplift. This new American Classical Revival trend differed from the earlier Spanish neoclassical tradition in scale and formality, with the latter favoring more restrained façades and utilitarian materials adapted to the tropics, and the former employing grander axial plans and monumental staircases. A great example of this scale and monumentality can be seen in large projects such as the Capitol of Puerto Rico, designed by Rafael Carmoega to become the seat of the Puerto Rican government in the aftermath of the Foraker Act and built in 1929, with a Georgia stone-grandiose design inspired by the Low Memorial Library of Columbia University in New York City, and intended to echo the monumentality of the federal and state capitols throughout the United States. On the municipal level, large state-sponsored libraries and public schools began to appear, such as in Ponce with the Ponce High School, designed by Adrian C. Finlayson and built in 1902.

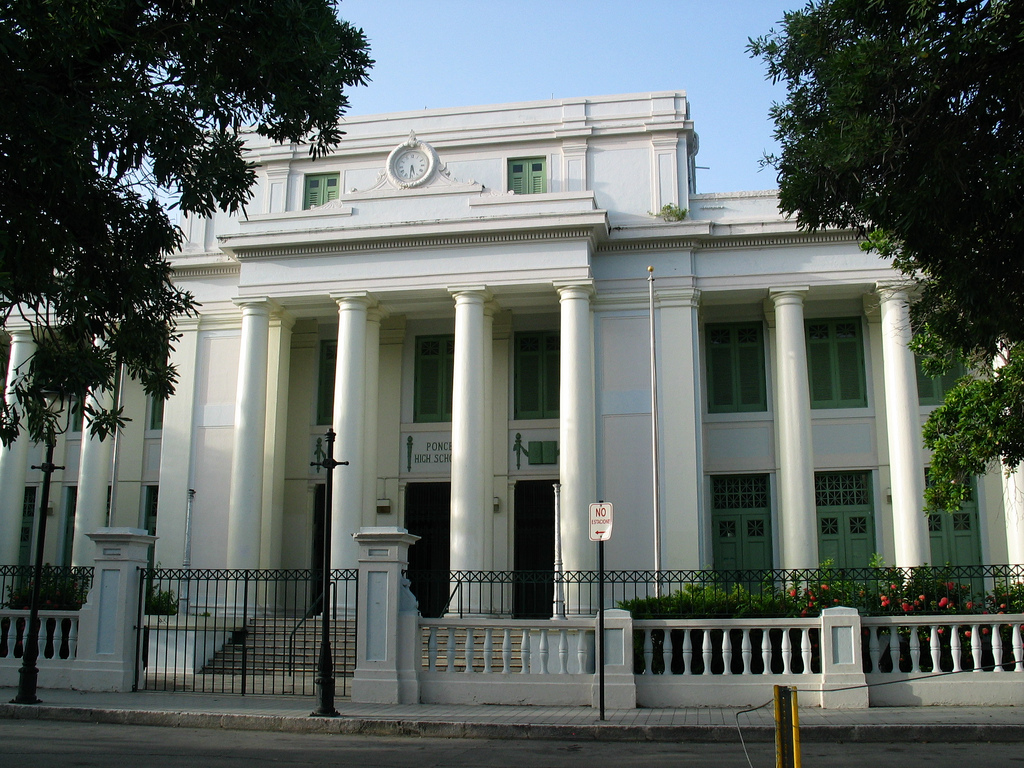
Ponce High School (1902)

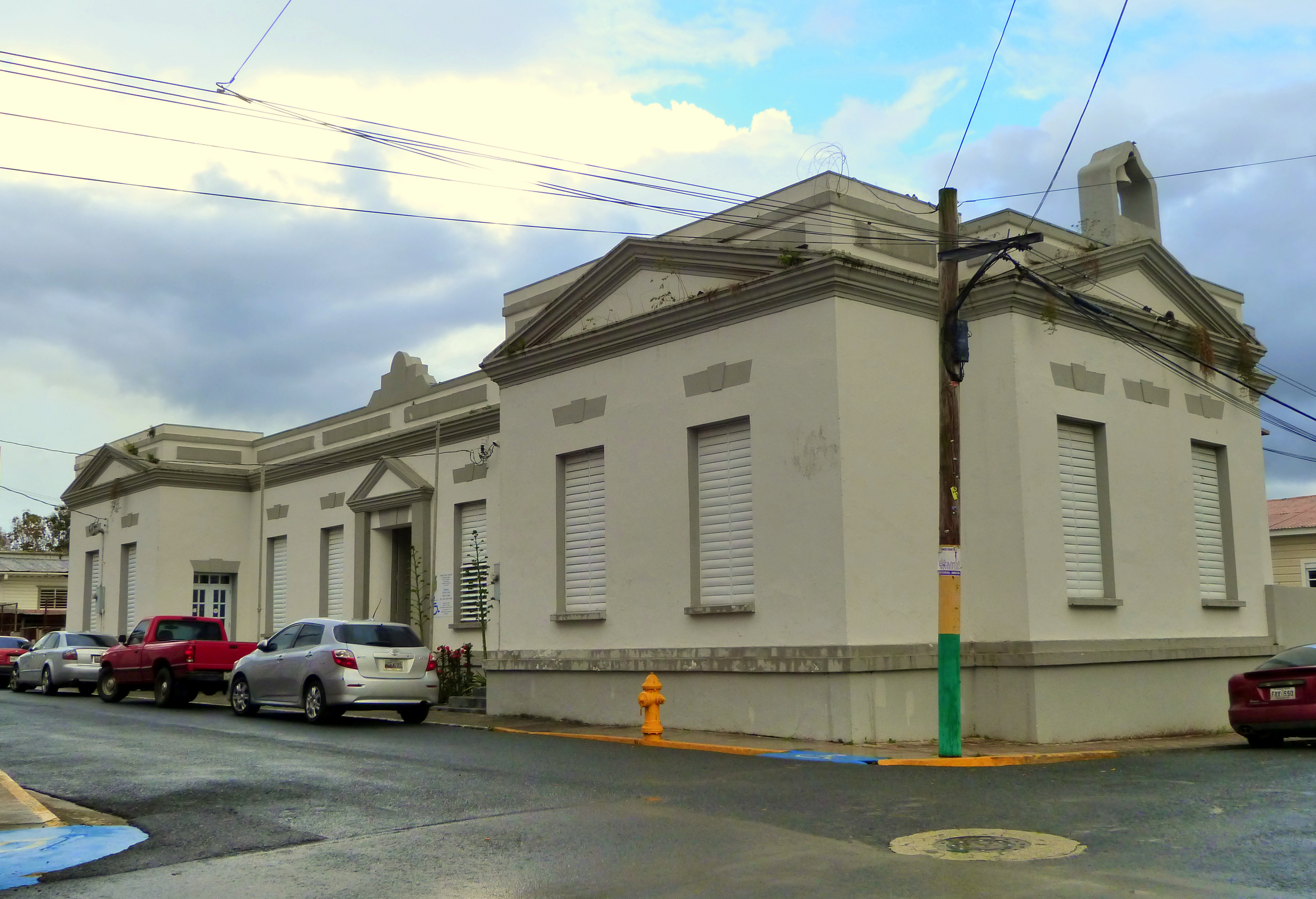
James Fenimore Cooper School (1903) in Sabana Grande

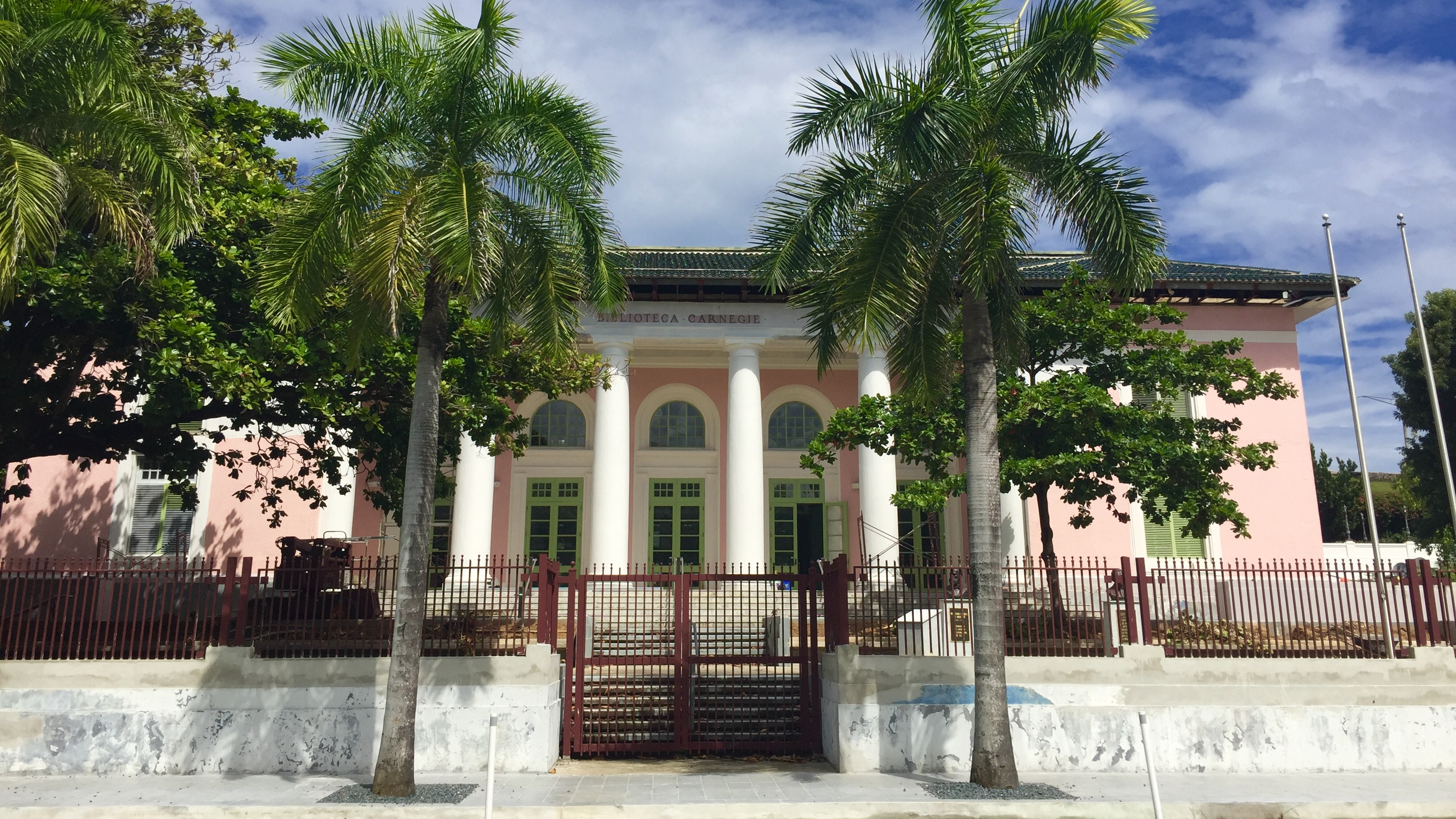
Carnegie Library (1915) in Puerta de Tierra

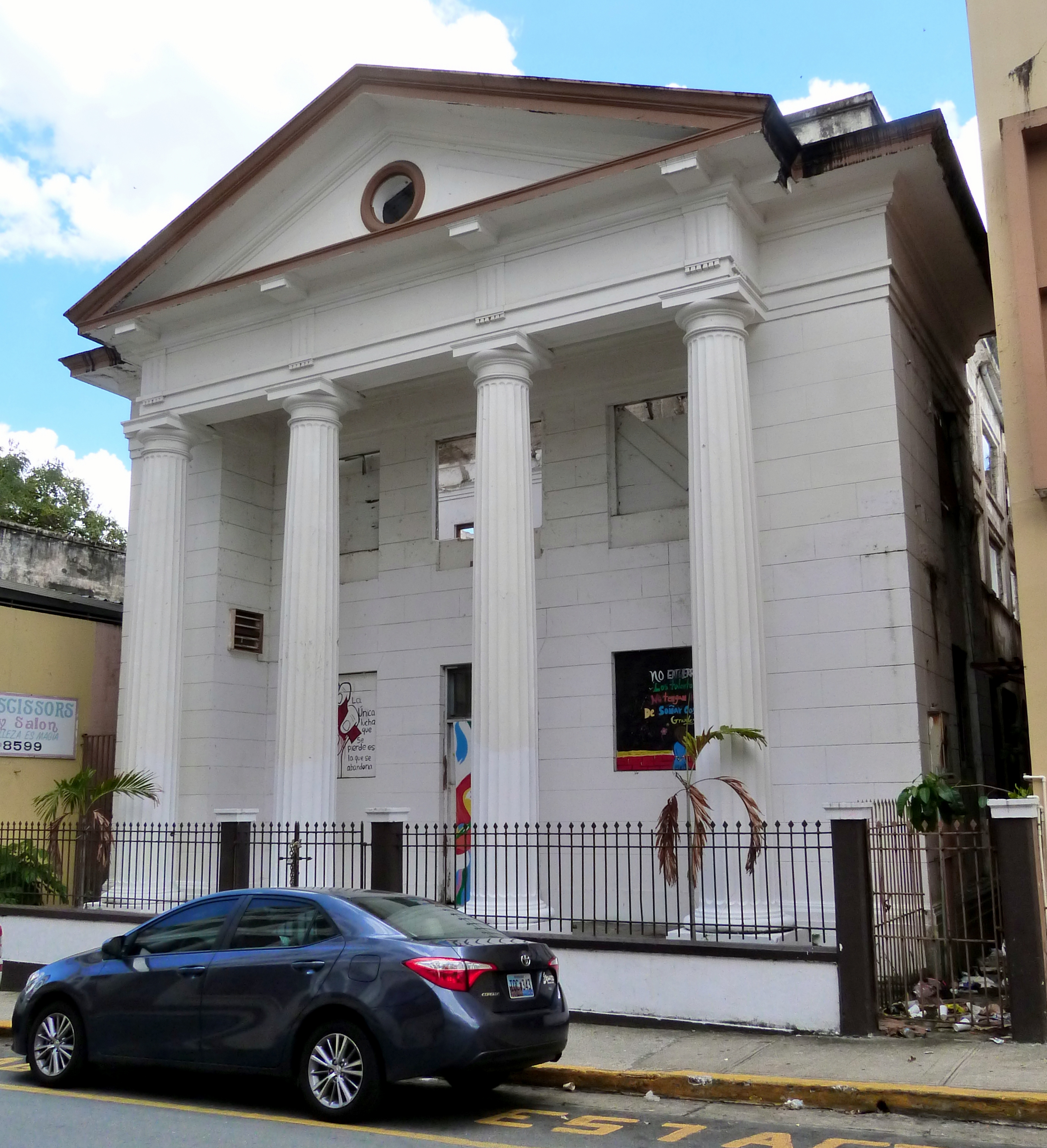
Logia Unión y Amparo No. 44 (1923) in Caguas

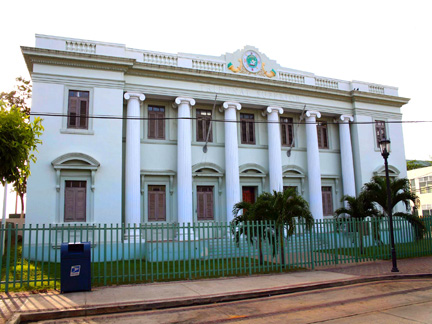
District Courthouse (1925) of Aguadilla

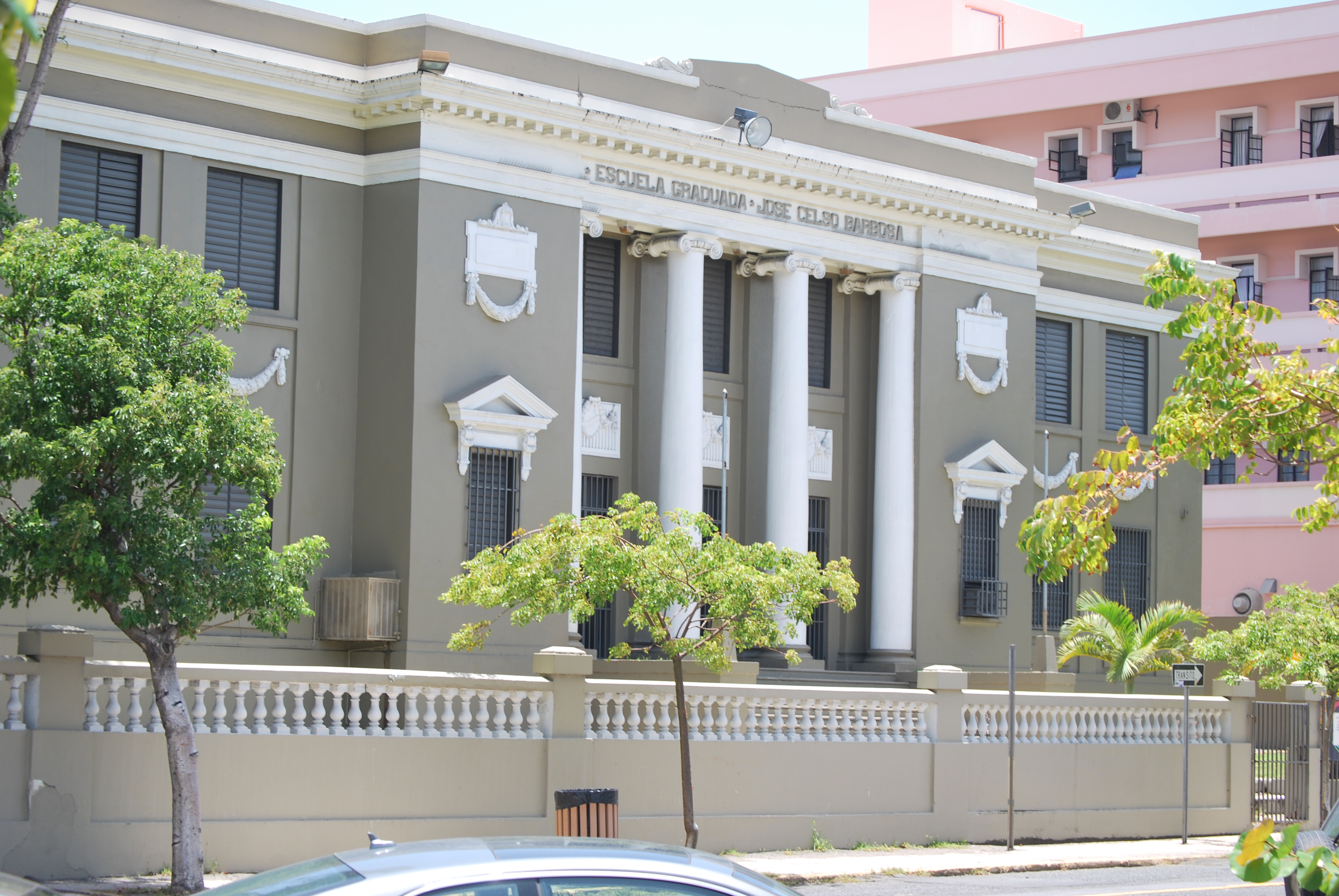
José Celso Barbosa Graded School (1927) in Puerta de Tierra

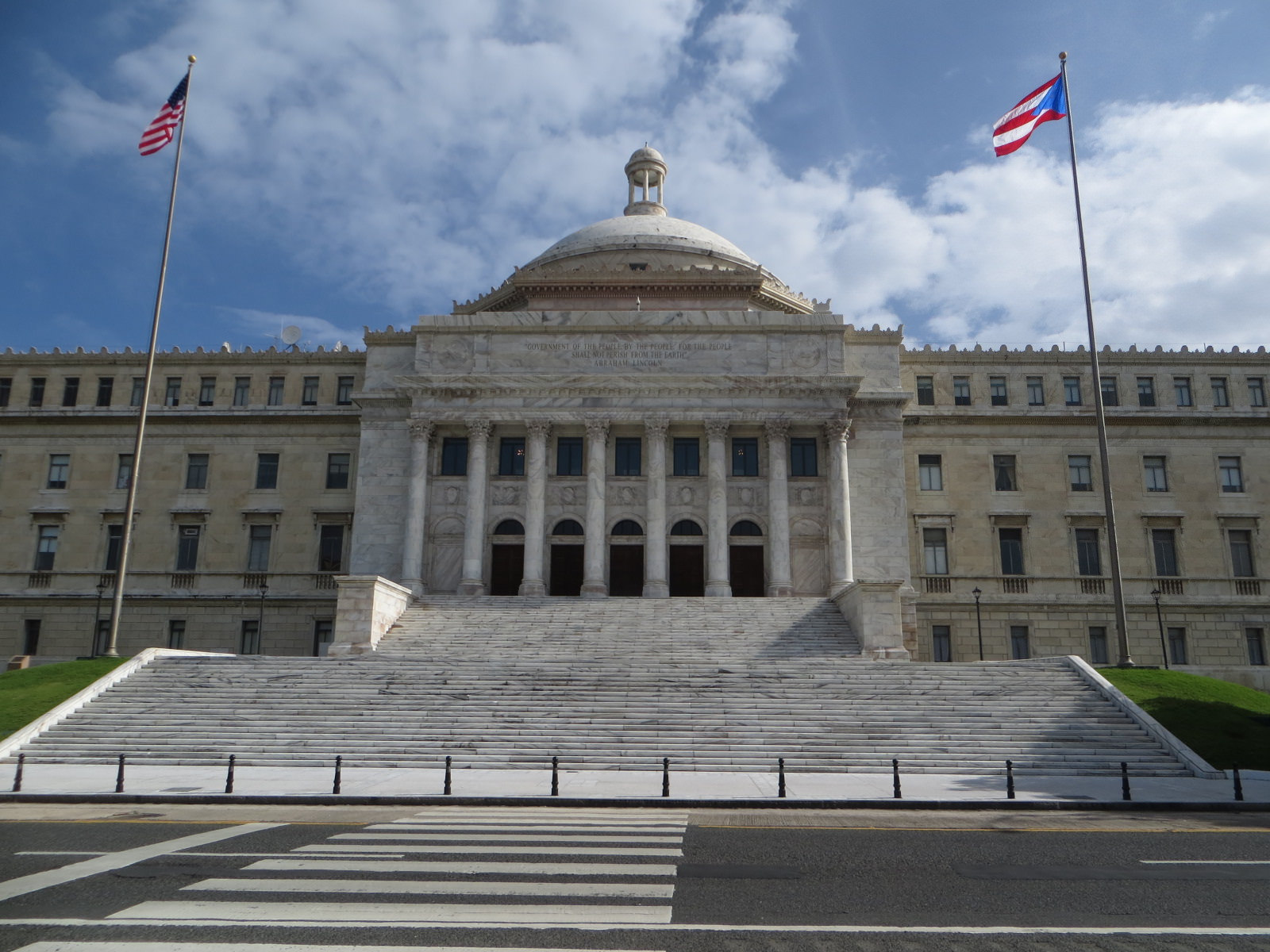
Capitol of Puerto Rico (1929) in Puerta de Tierra

The development of casinos, opera houses, theaters and cinemas also followed suit. The Yagüez Theater of Mayagüez (the oldest movie theater in Puerto Rico and the Caribbean), designed by celebrated architect Sabàs Honoré and constructed in 1909 by Francisco Maymón Palmer in order to show his silent films to the public. Many of these structures did not homogeneously apply the Progressive Era architectural parameters but in actually adapted them to the already existing trends established by the Ponce Creole styles of the previous century. The Ponce Creole style itself adapted these monumental characteristics and, beyond the North American Classical Revival movement, also taking direct inspiration from Gothic, Byzantine, Georgian, Baroque and Rococo styles, jumpstarting a rich period of European-influenced Revivalism applied into the North American Progressive Era urban planning of the time.

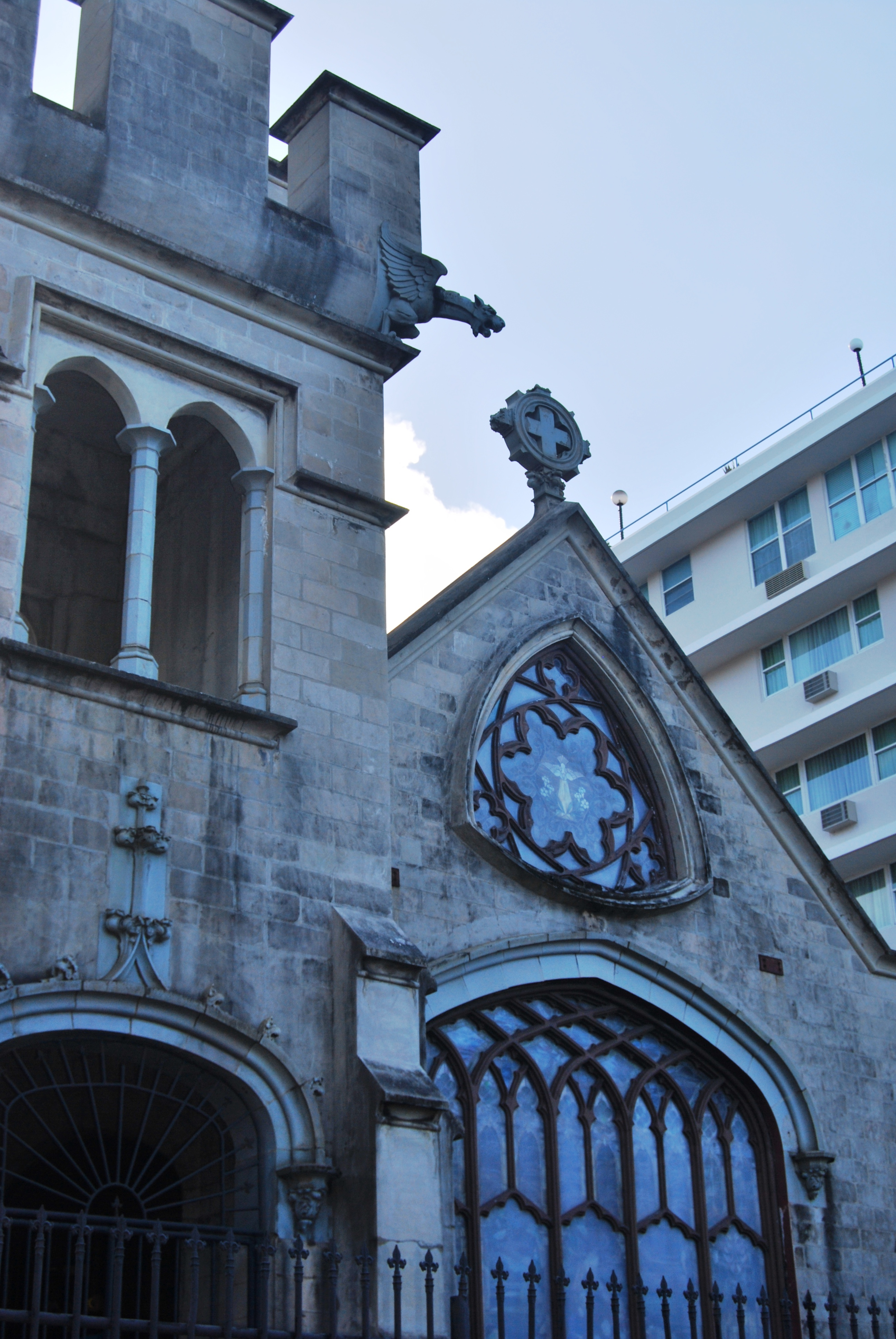
Our Lady of Lourdes Chapel (1908) in Santurce

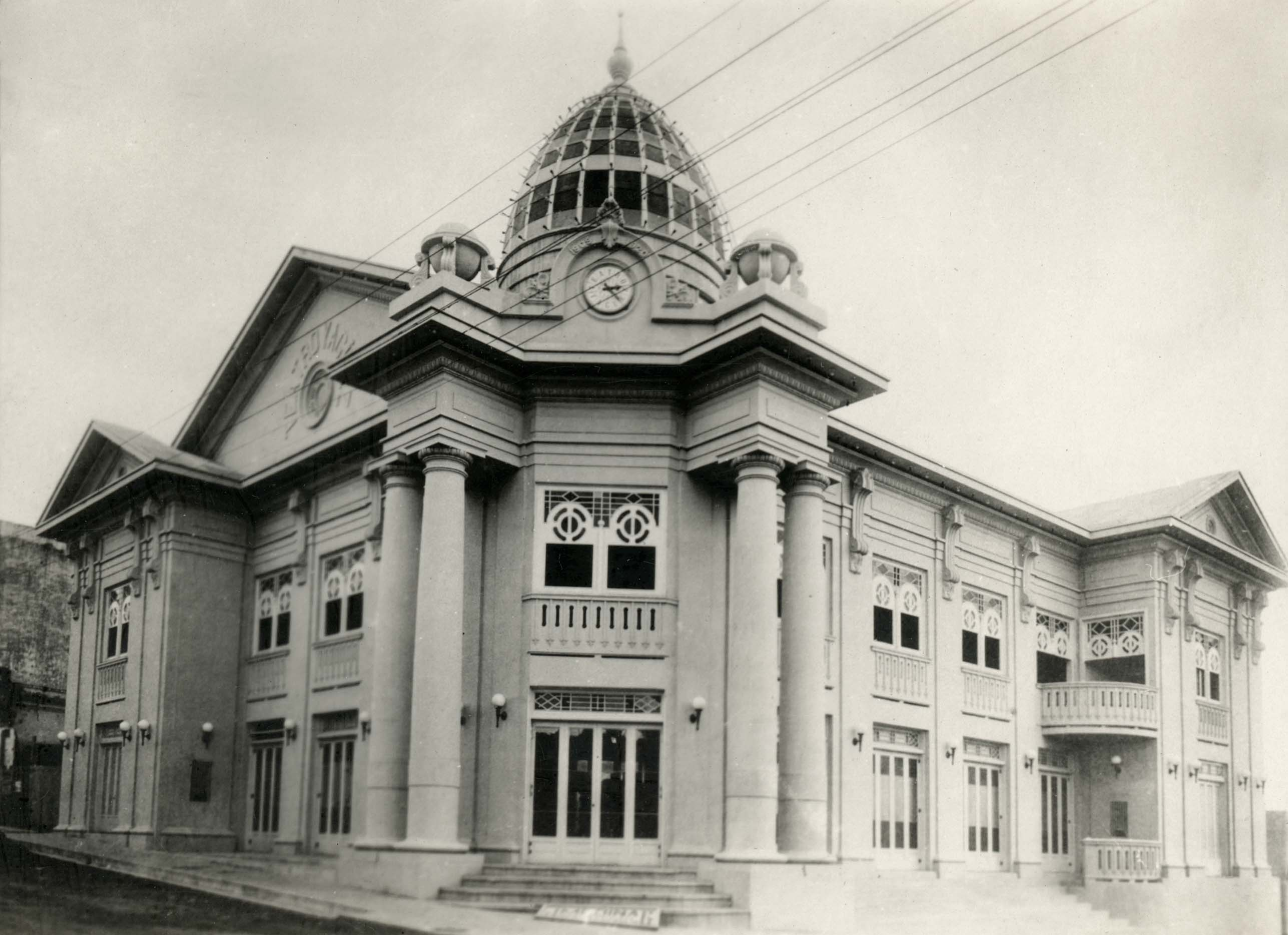
Teatro Yagüez (1909) in Mayagüez

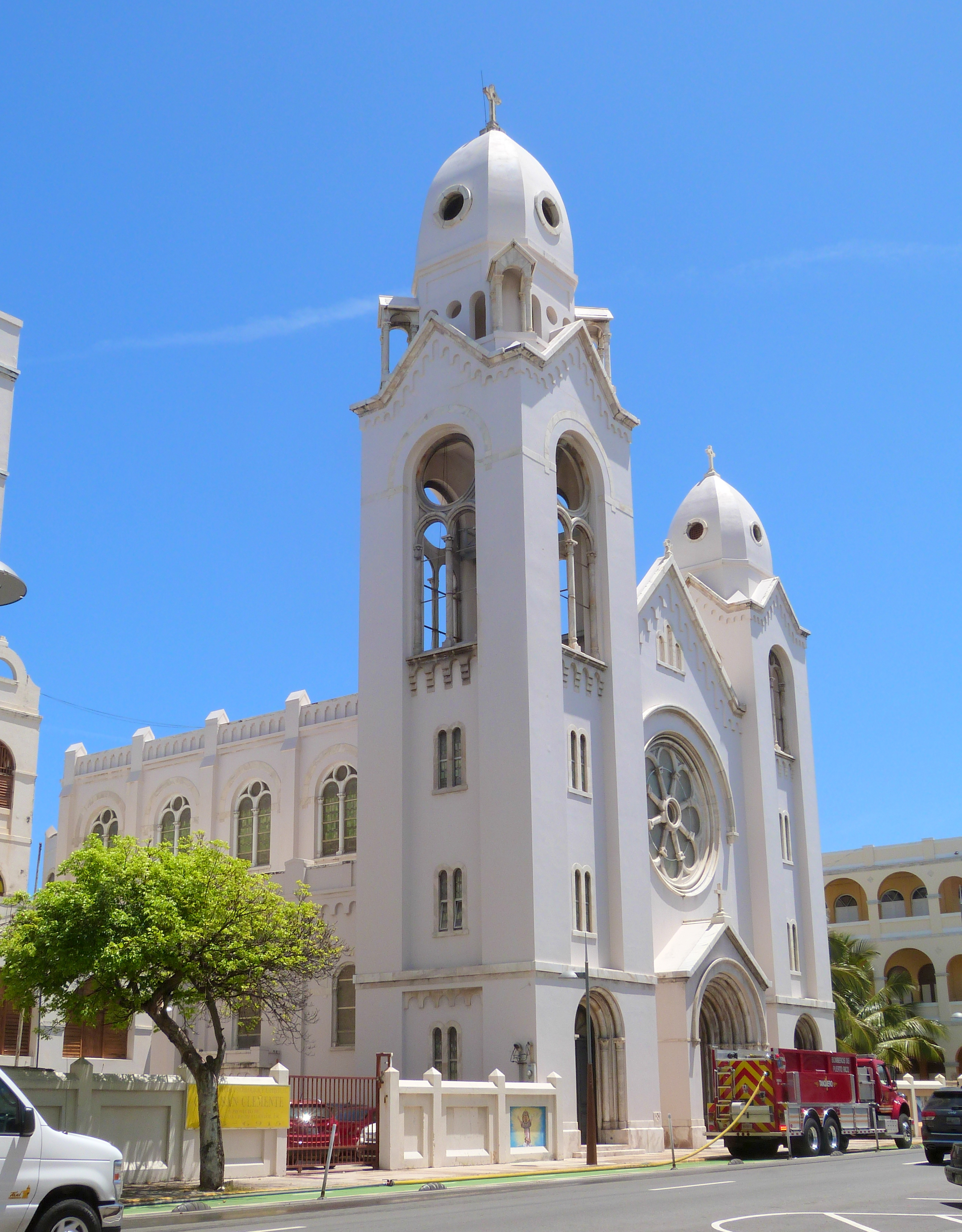
Church of St. Augustine (1915) in Puerta de Tierra

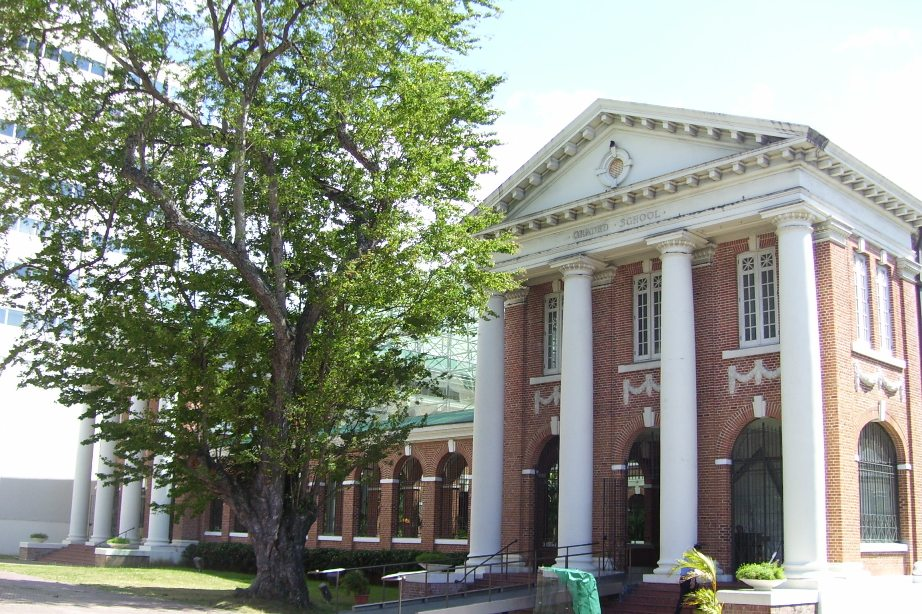
Rafael M. Labra High School (1916) in Santurce

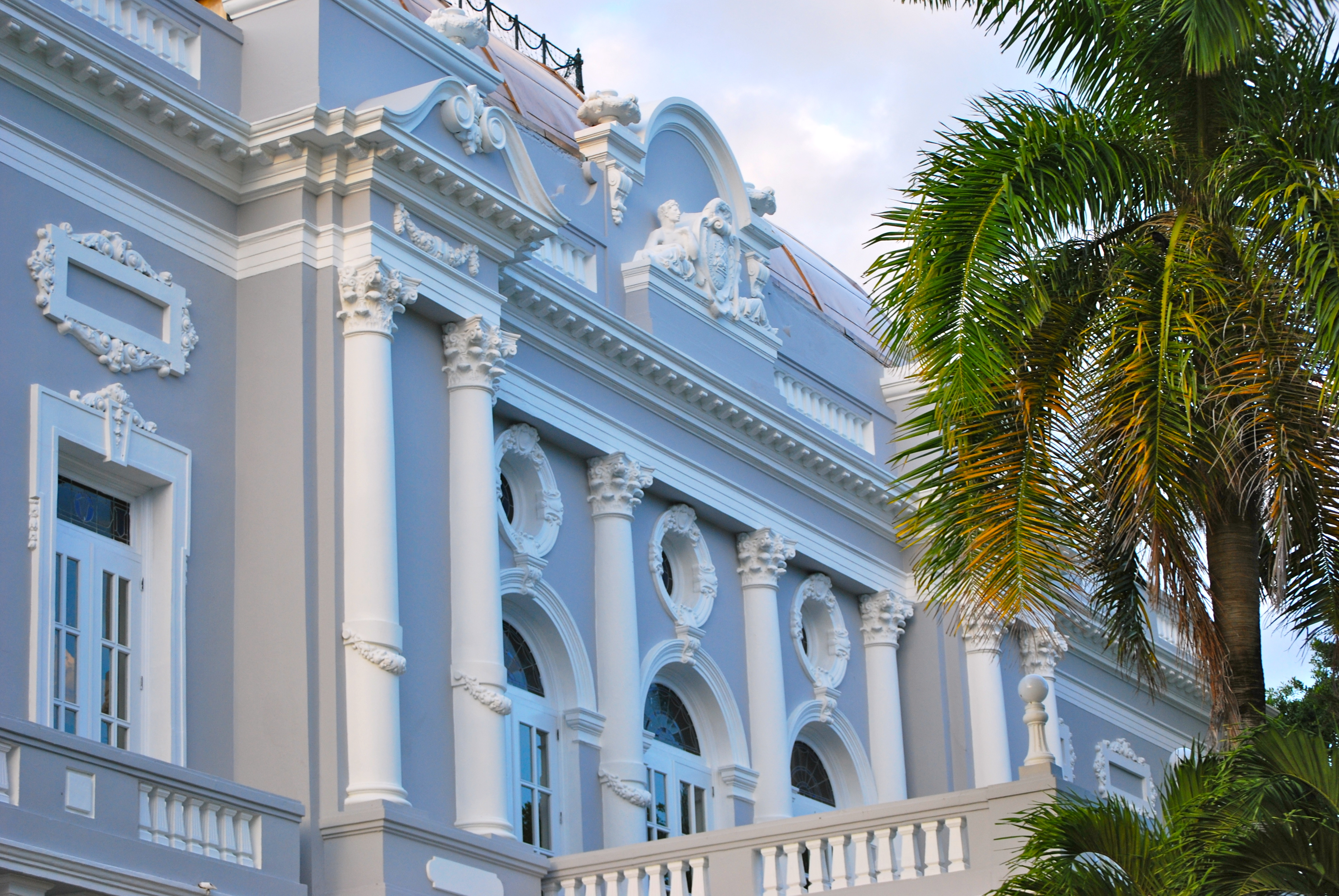
Casino de Puerto Rico (1917) in Old San Juan

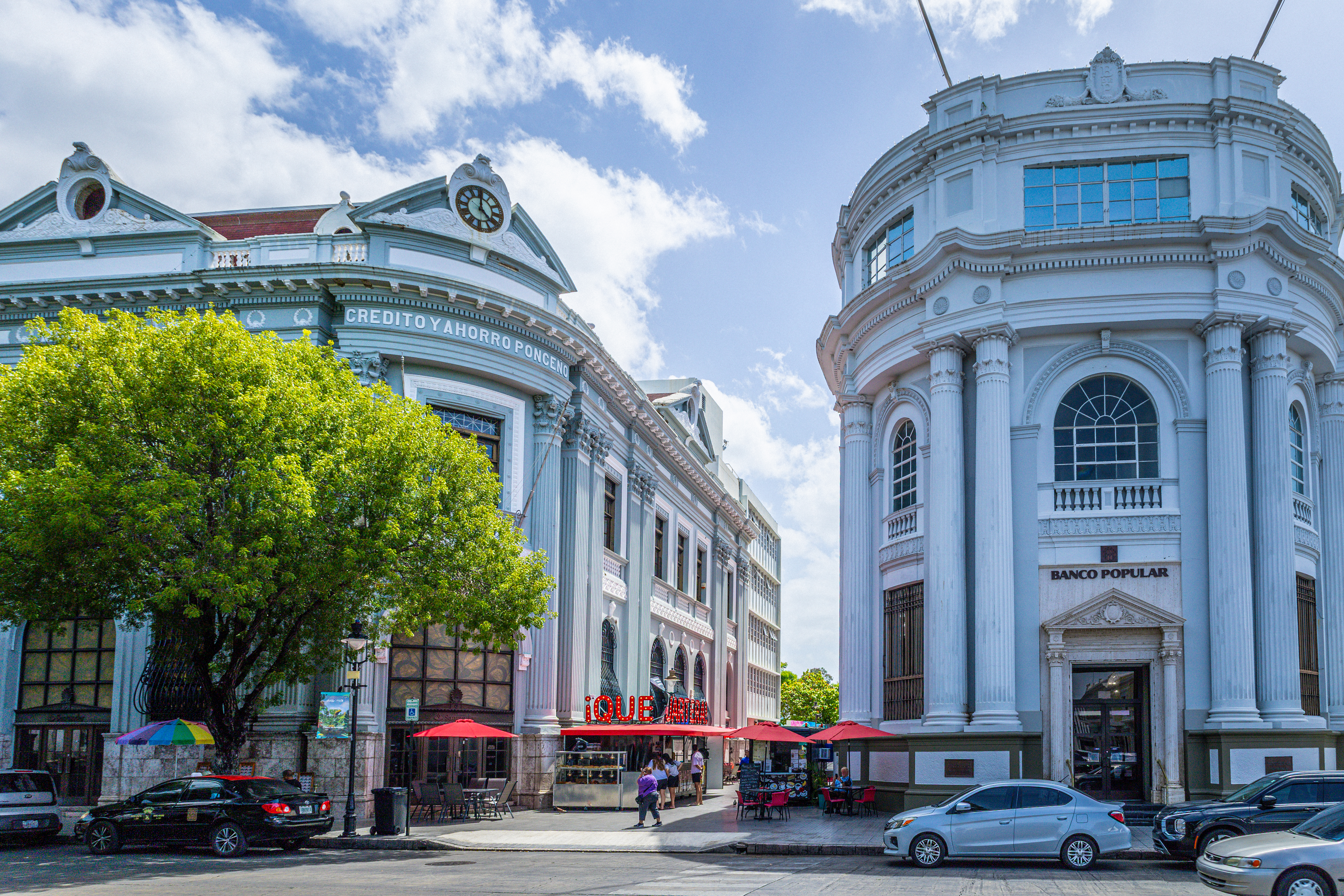
Former headquarters (1924) of the Banco Crédito y Ahorro Ponceño (left) and Banco de Ponce (right) in Ponce

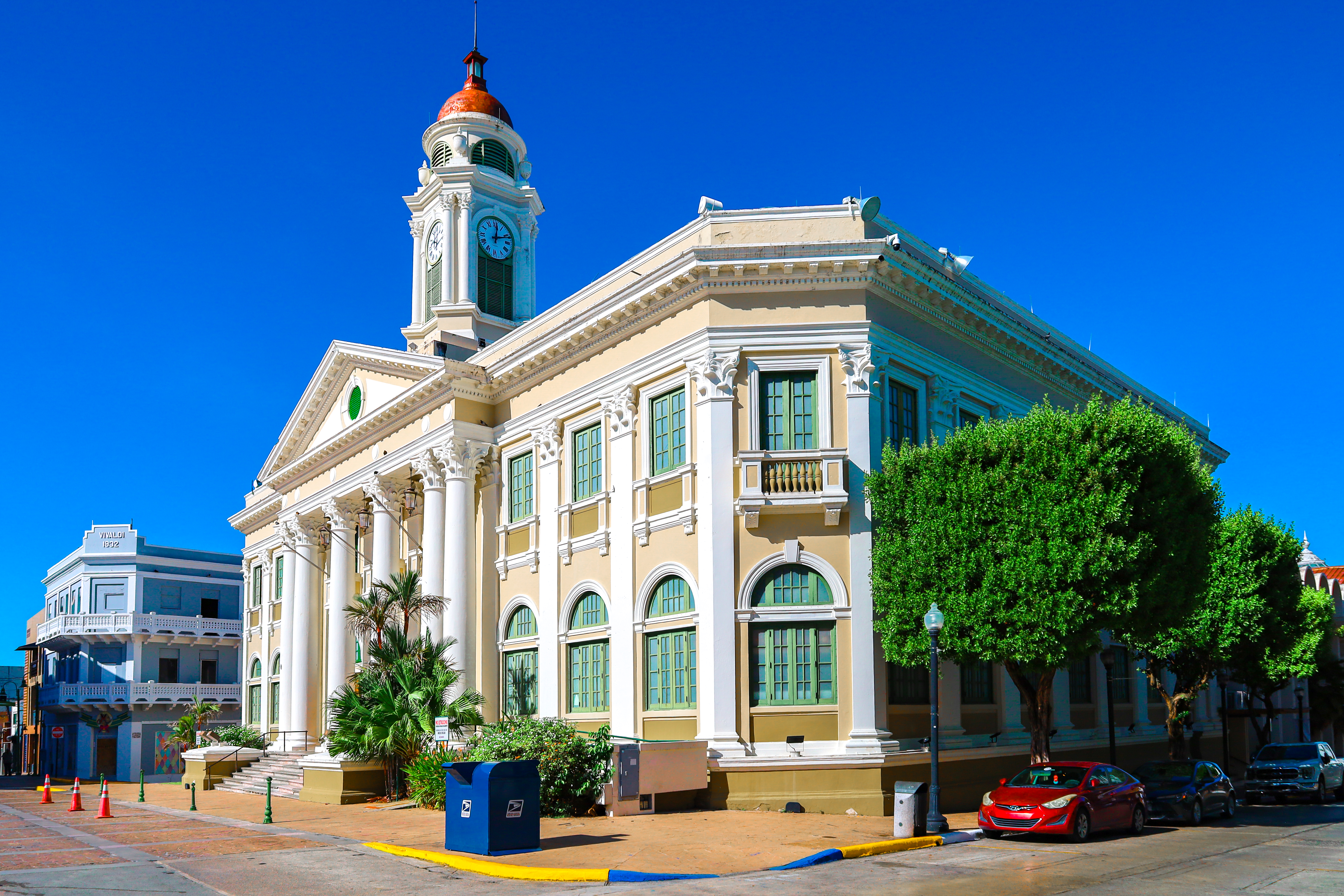
Mayagüez City Hall (1926)

This period also saw the introduction of Mission Revival and Spanish Colonial Revival designs, styles that had first gained popularity in the American West and Florida in the late 19th and early 20th centuries. Inspired by the romanticized remains of the Spanish missions of California, these buildings blended stucco walls, red-tile roofs, arched arcades and wrought-iron details intended to create an idealized image of the Spanish colonial past. After centuries of direct Spanish rule, the arrival of this style in Puerto Rico was somewhat paradoxical, with these reframed colonial aesthetics perceived as more American than Spanish that, while seen as "nostalgic and ancient" by an American lens, it was perceived as modern and even futuristic by Puerto Rican architects and engineers, who would later incorporate these motifs into incoming international styles, such as Art Deco. A great example of this was the El Mundo headquarters in Old San Juan, built in direct inspiration by the Chicago School skyscrapers of the previous century, while incorporating Spanish-inspired designs that would later inform future Art Deco trends. Another notable example of this is the Jose V. Toledo Federal Courthouse. Built on a site previously occupied by a Spanish bastion, this federal building was built by architects James Knox Taylor and Louis A. Simon, with one building opening in 1914 and the other in 1940, the latter being connected to the former via the south facade. The Mission Revival building of 1914 and its Modernist 1940 side visually connect the evolution of these 20th-century styles that permeated the development of the architecture of Puerto Rico at the time, as these designs would later be incorporated into local Art Deco and Modernist styles throughout the first half of the century in Puerto Rico.

Mission and Spanish Colonial Revival

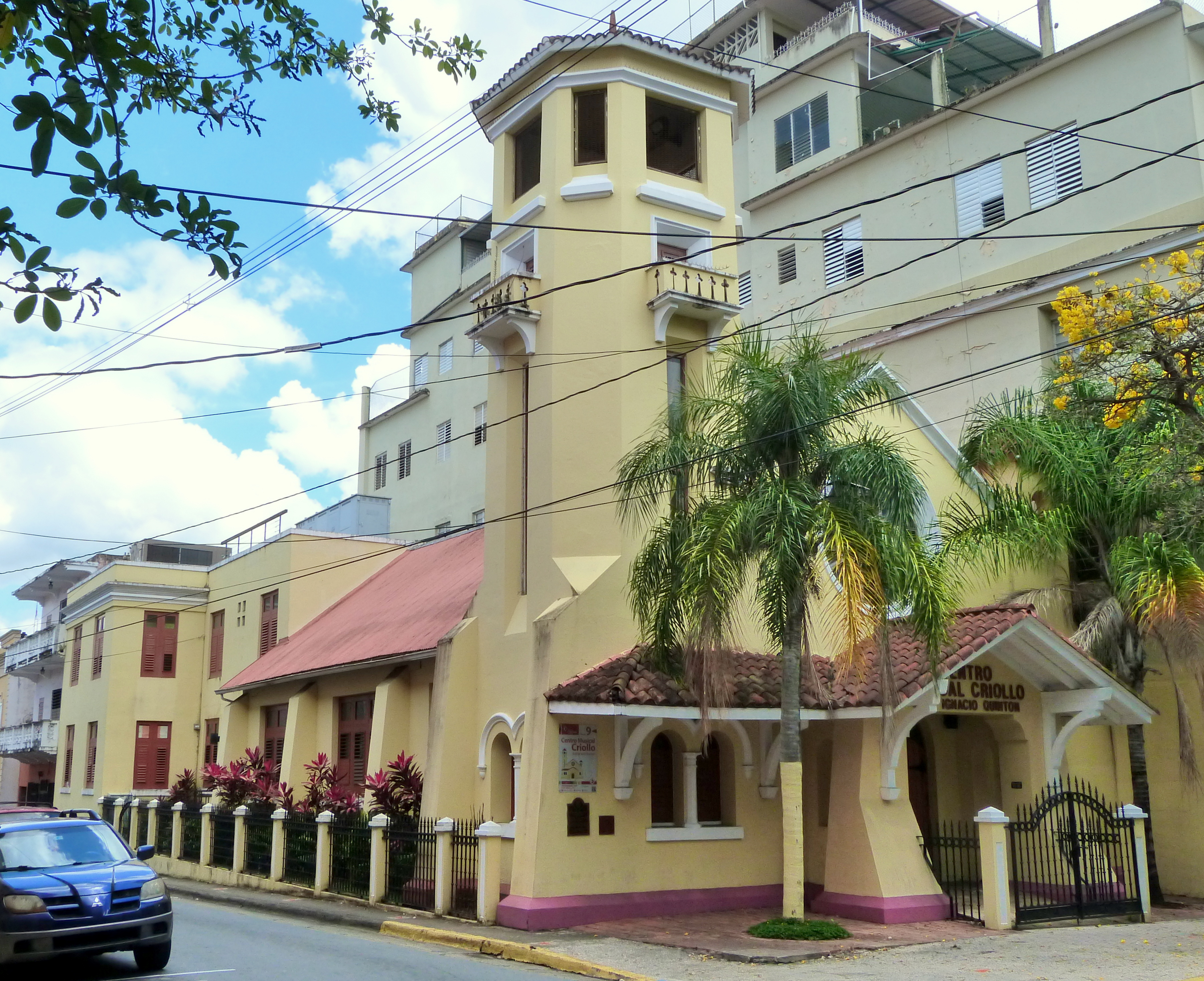
First Baptist Church (1909) in Caguas

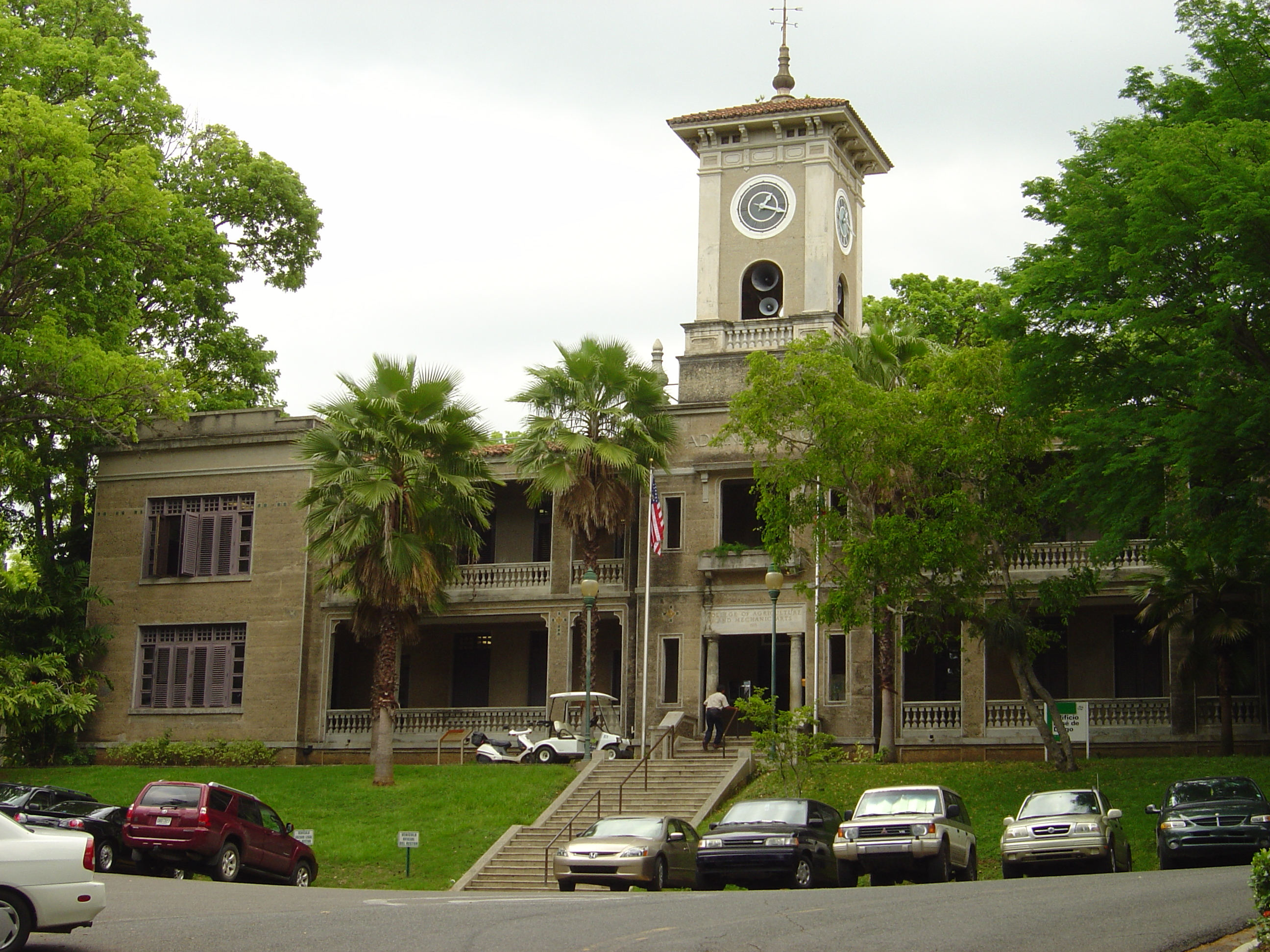
José de Diego Building (1913) at the University of Puerto Rico, Mayagüez

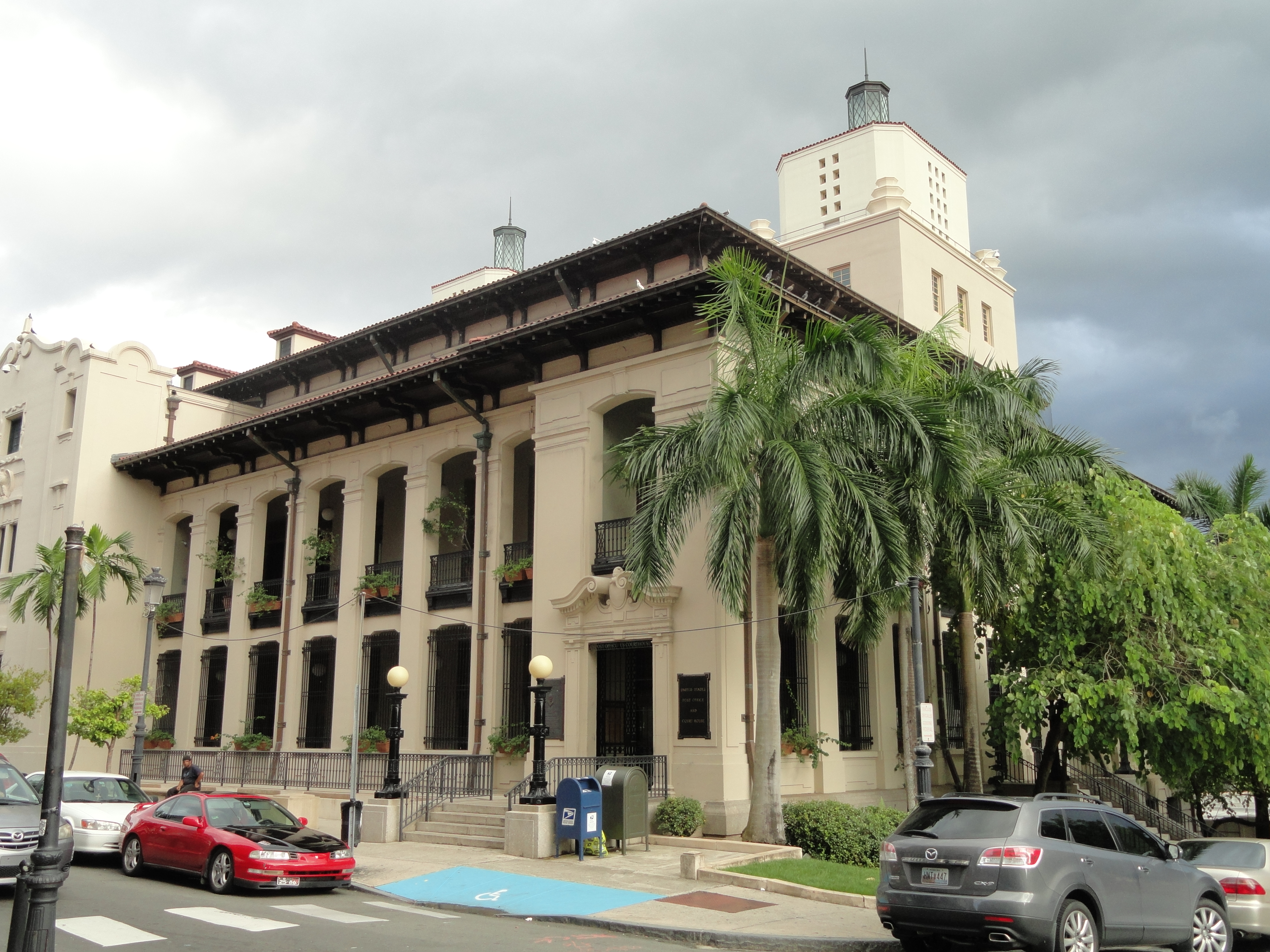
Jose V. Toledo Federal Courthouse (1914) in Old San Juan

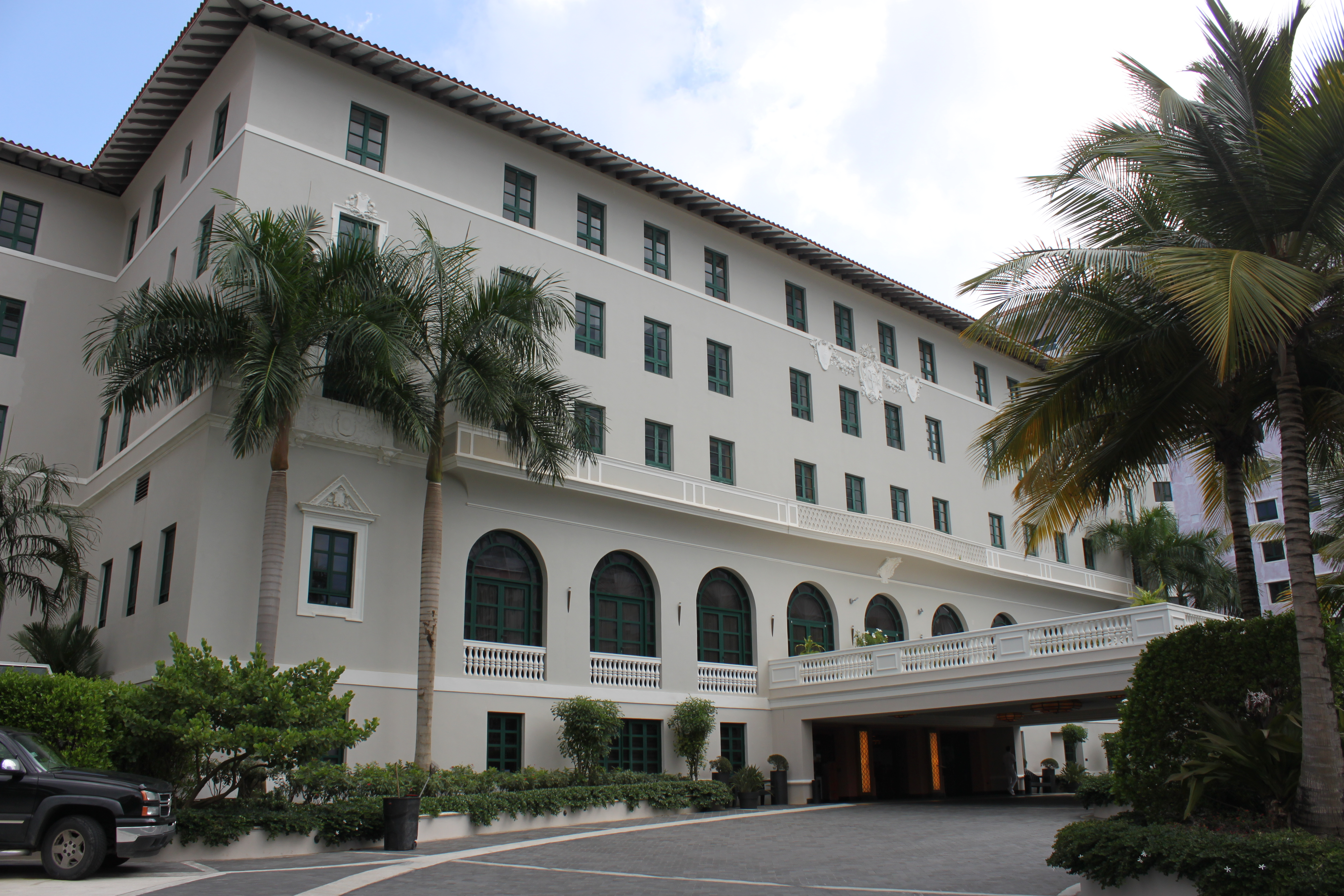
Condado Vanderbilt Hotel (1919) in Condado

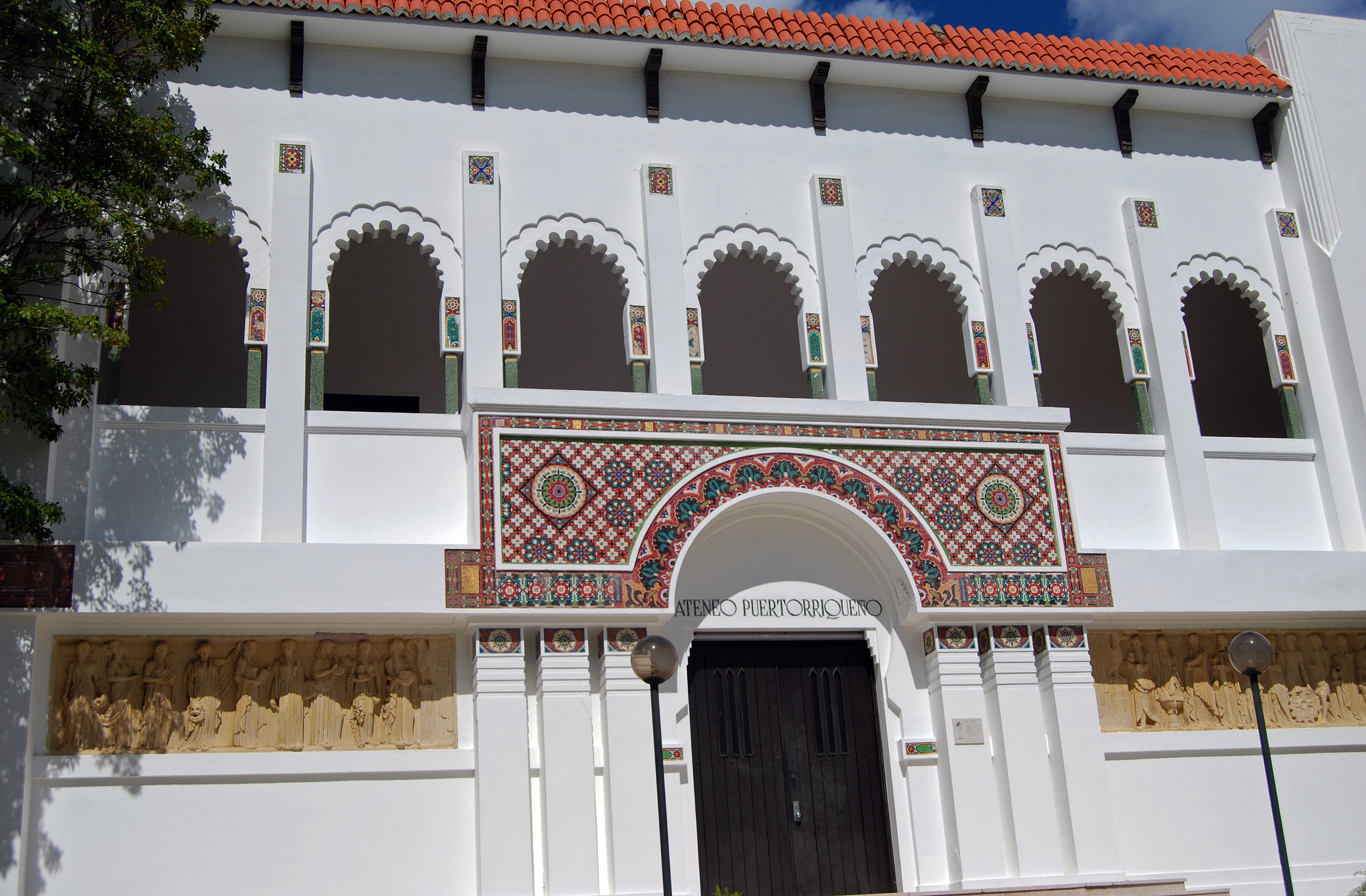
Ateneo Puertorriqueño (1923) in Puerta de Tierra

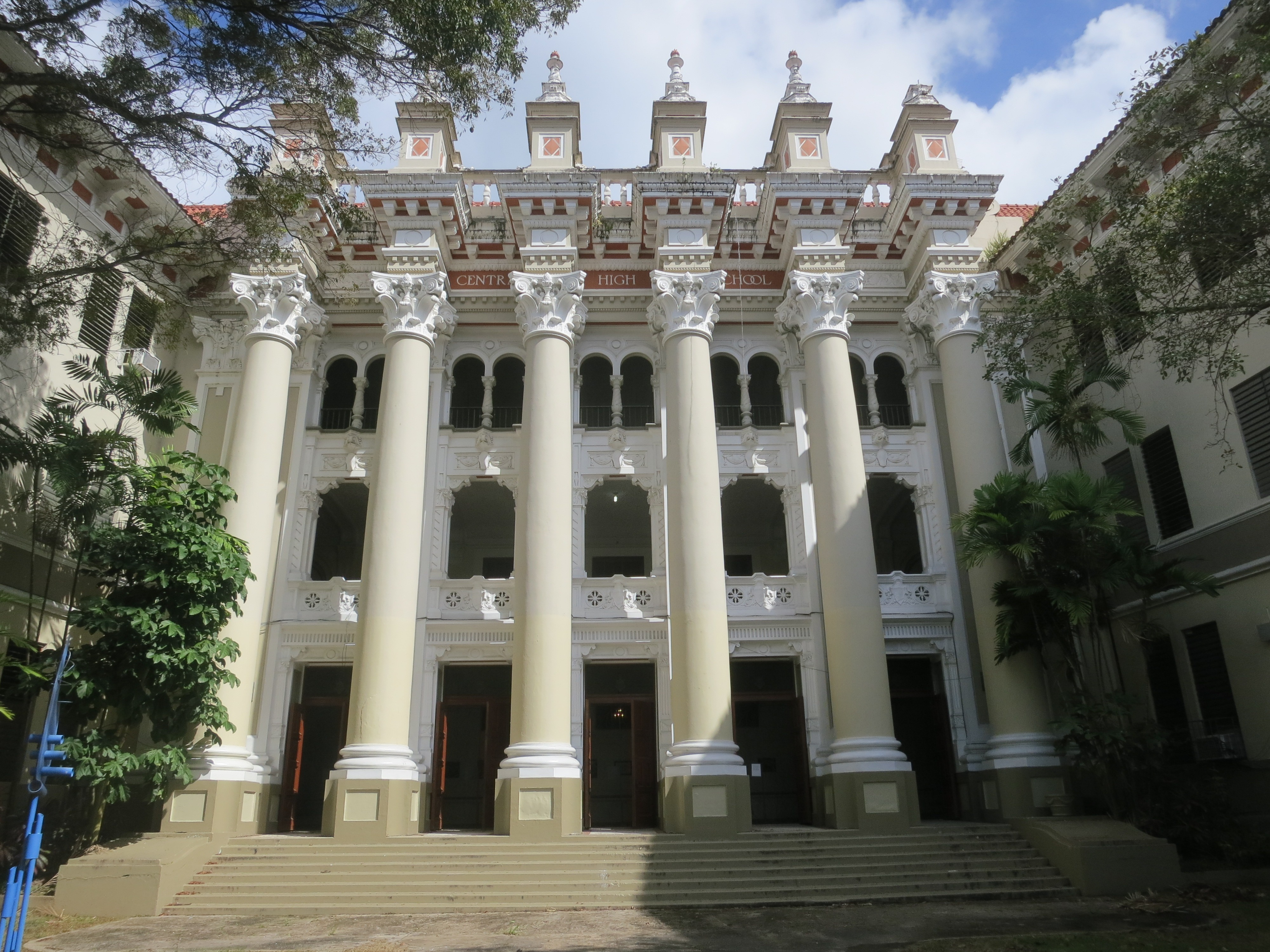
Central High School (1925) in Santurce

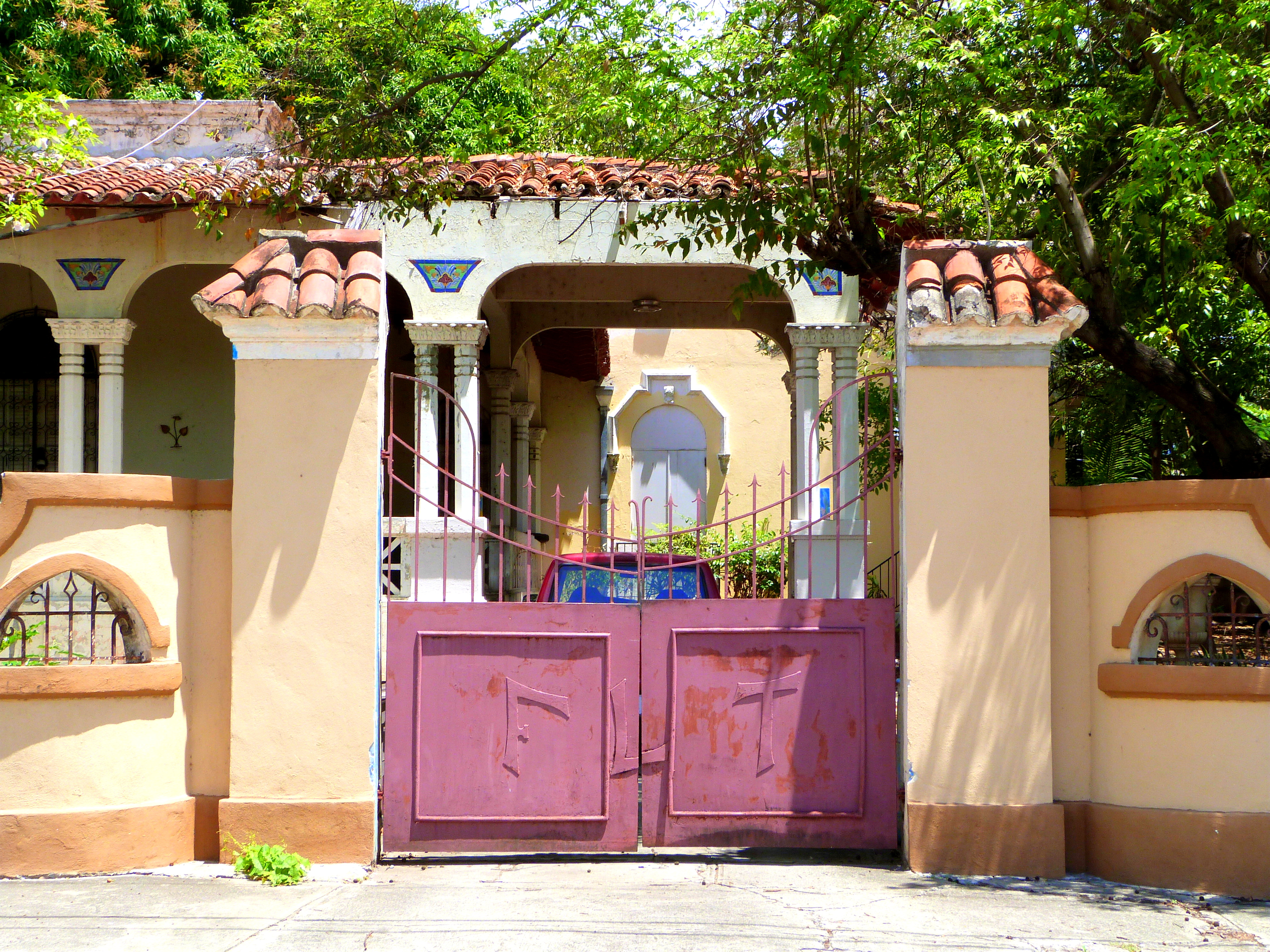
Fernando Luis Toro House (1927) in Ponce

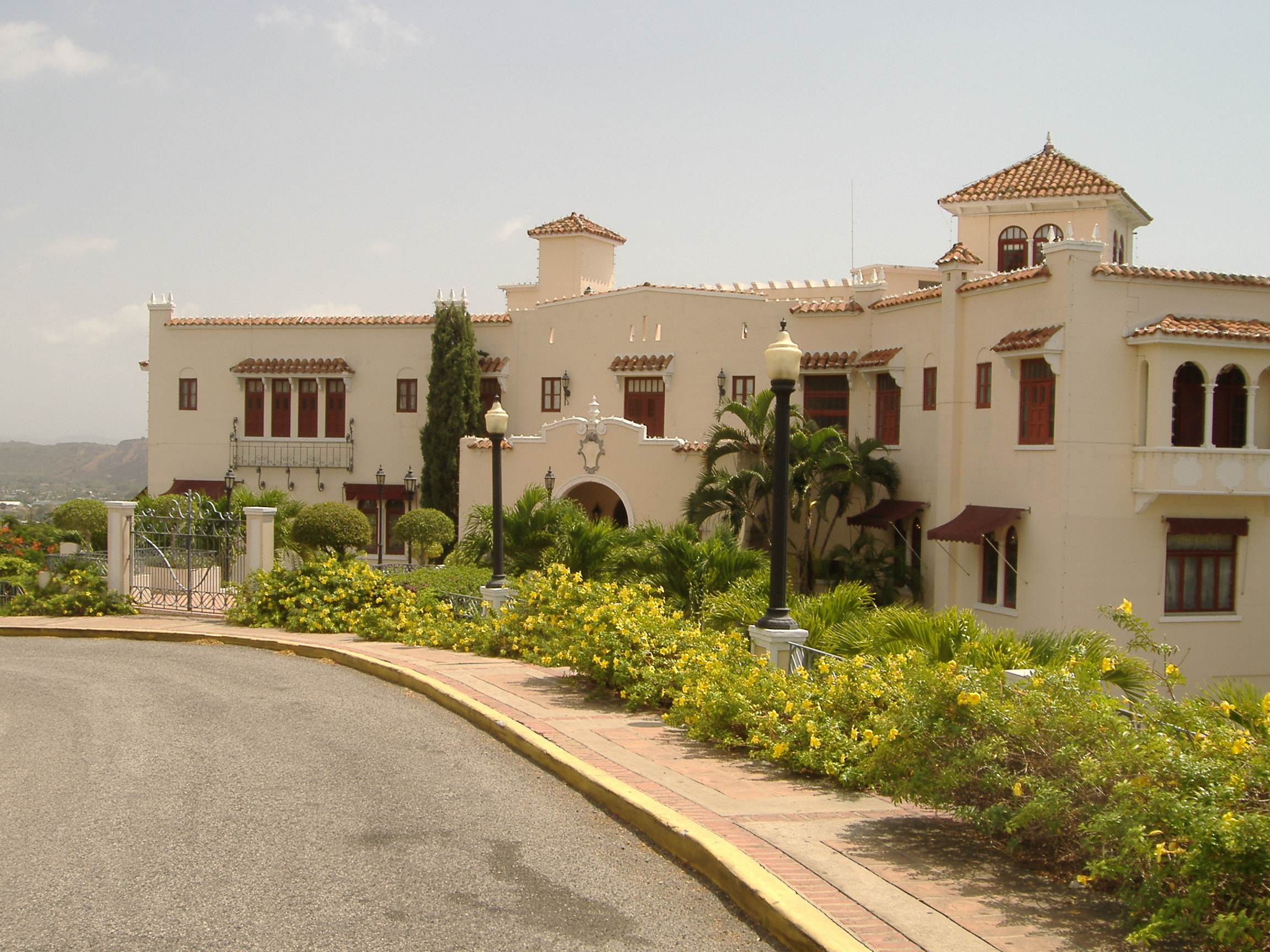
Castillo Serrallés (1930) in Ponce

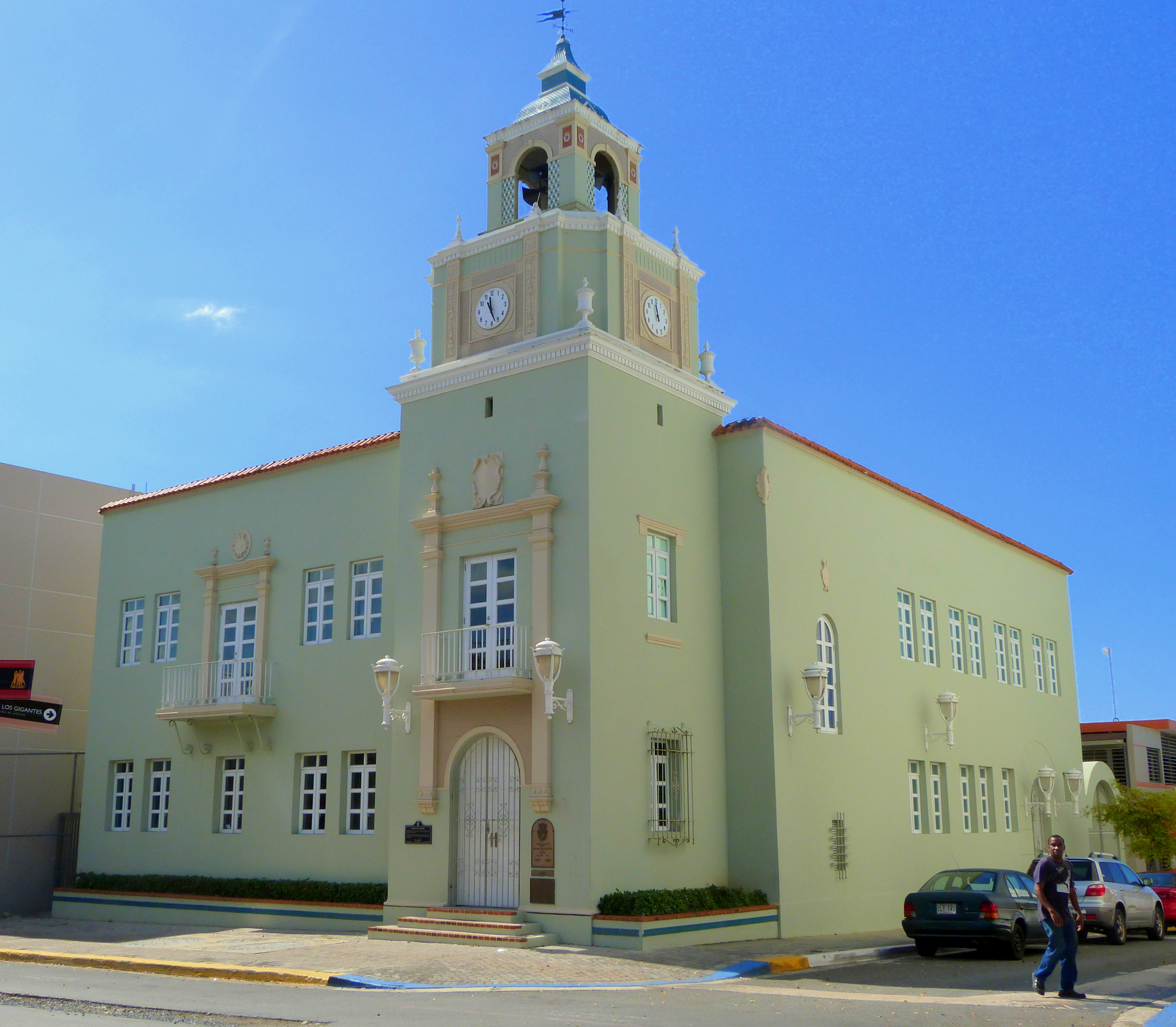
Carolina City Hall (1930)

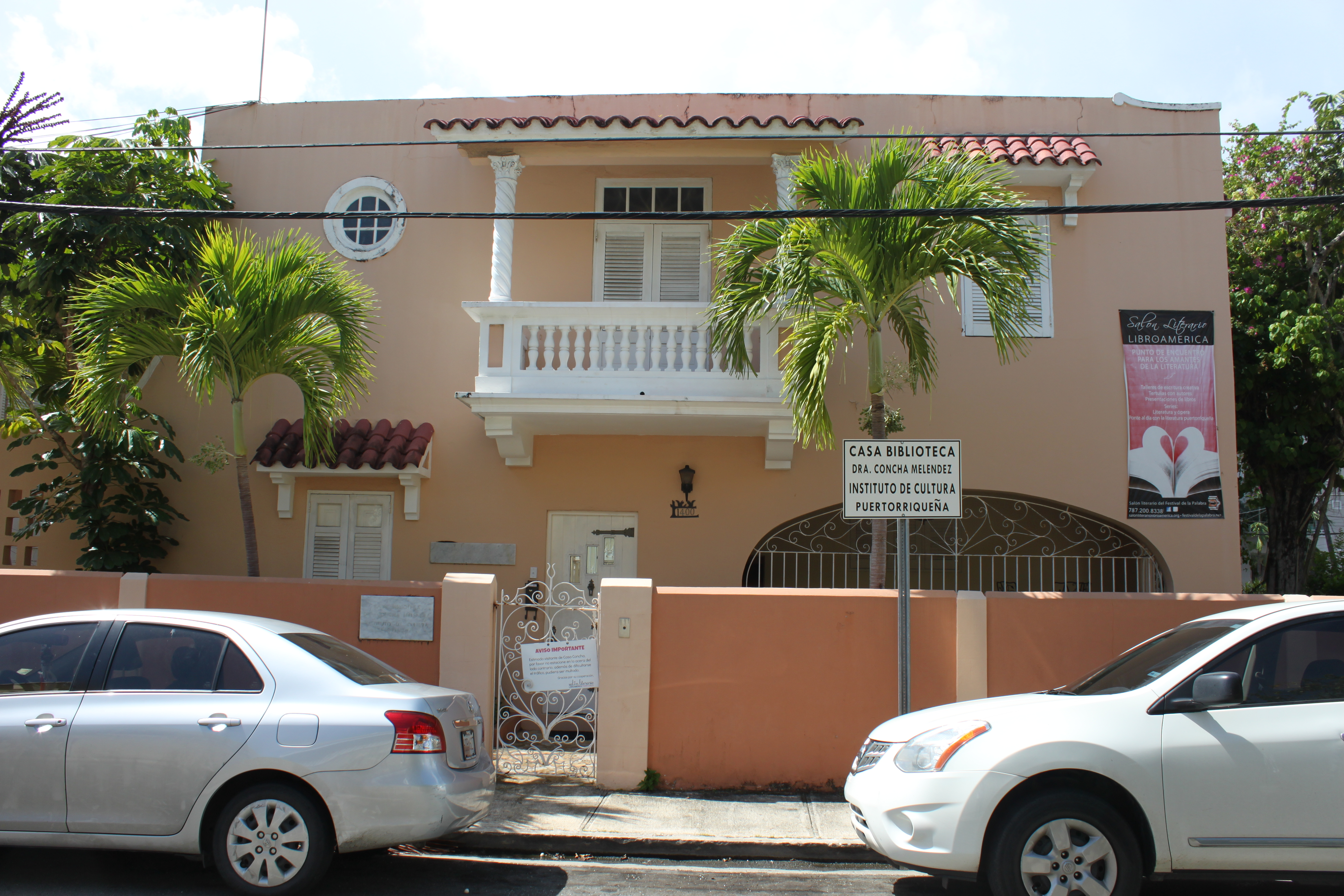
Dr. Concha Meléndez Ramírez House (1930) in Santurce

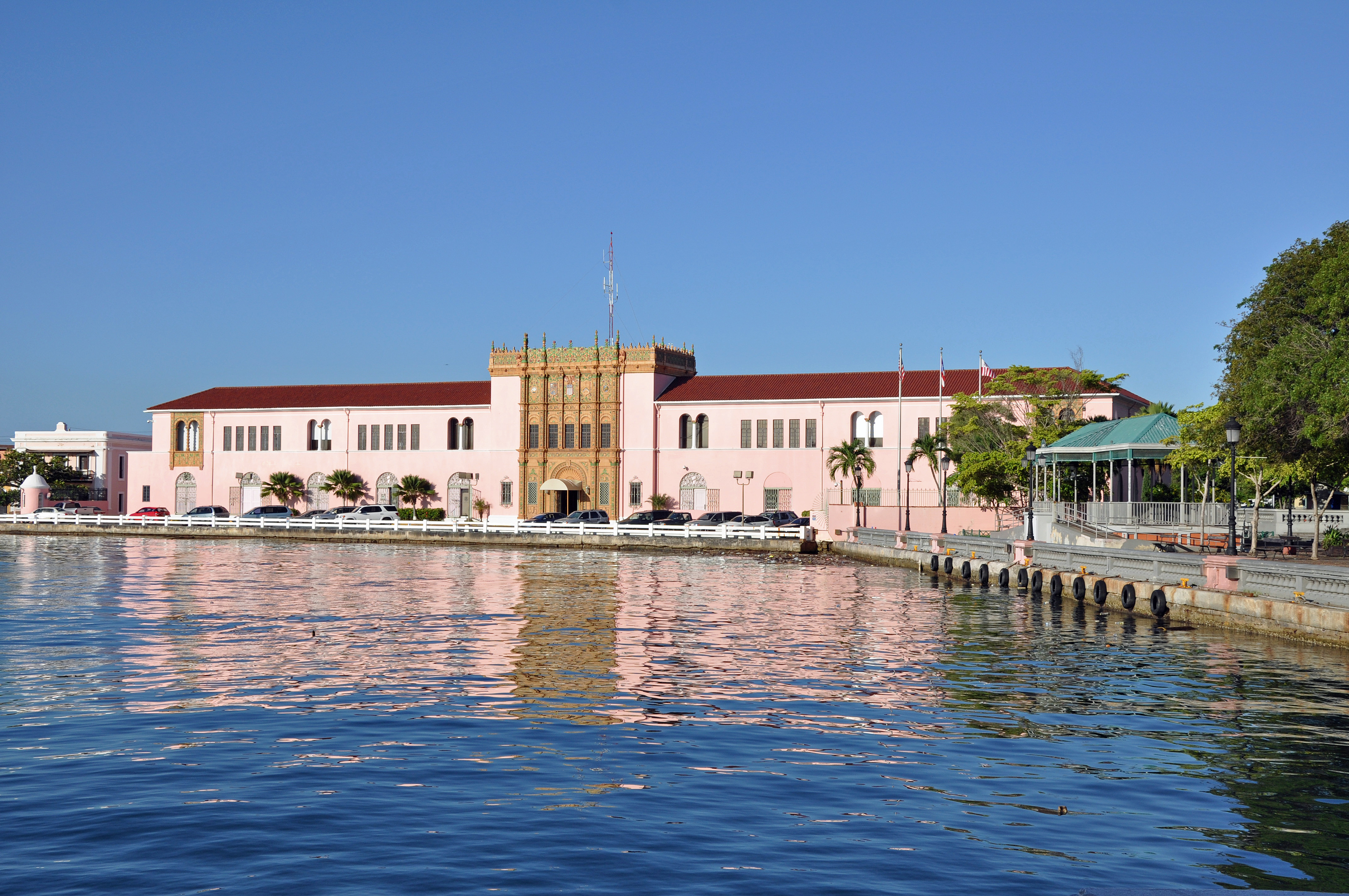
San Juan Custom House (1931) in Old San Juan

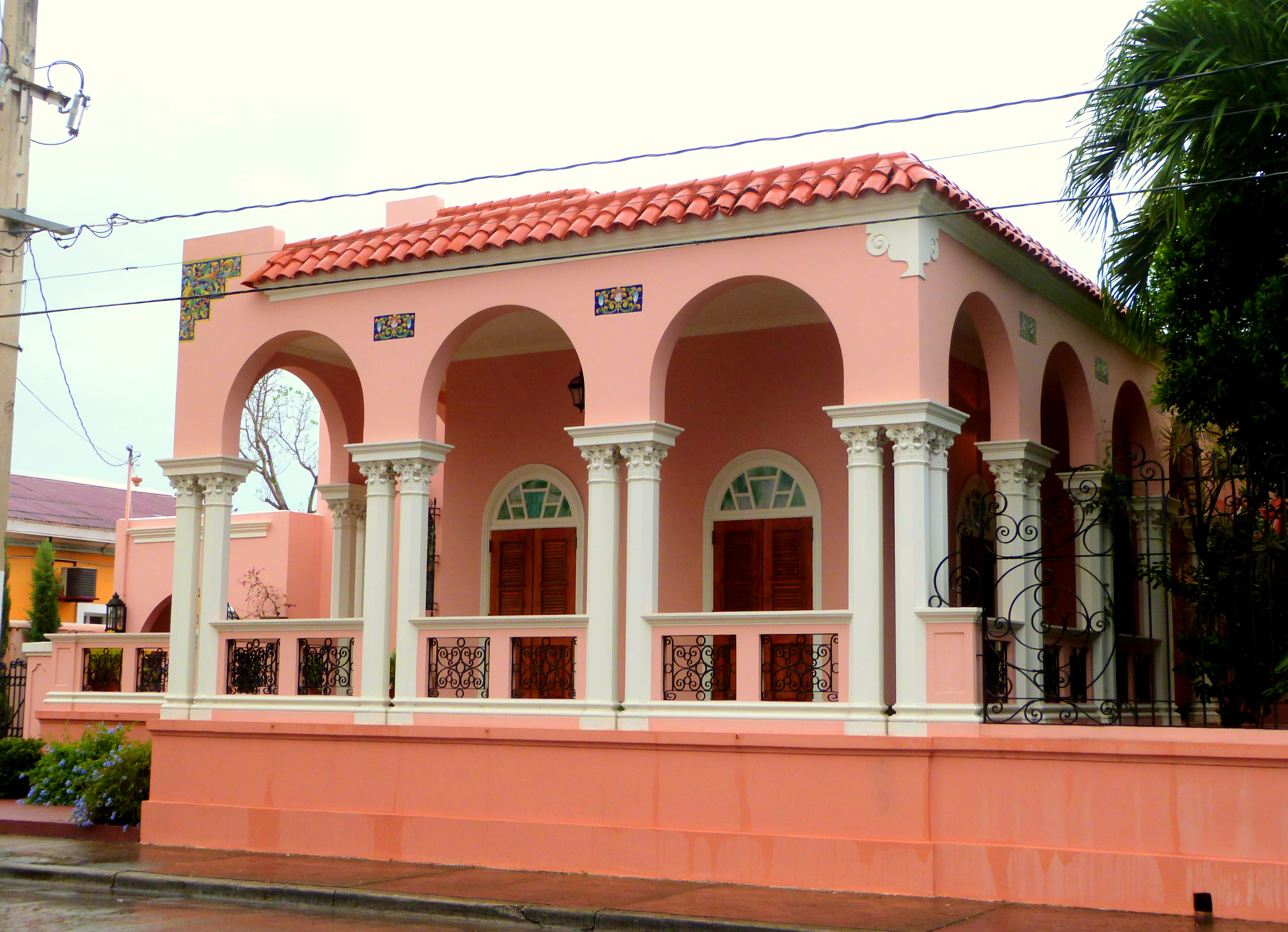
Gómez Residence (1933) in Mayagüez

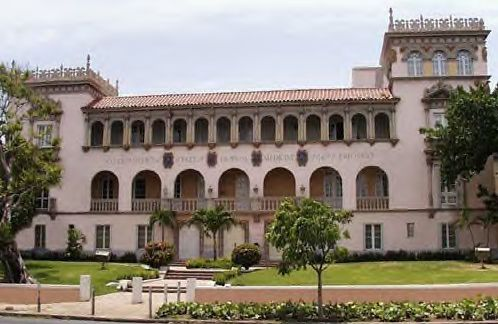
School of Tropical Medicine (1926) in Puerta de Tierra

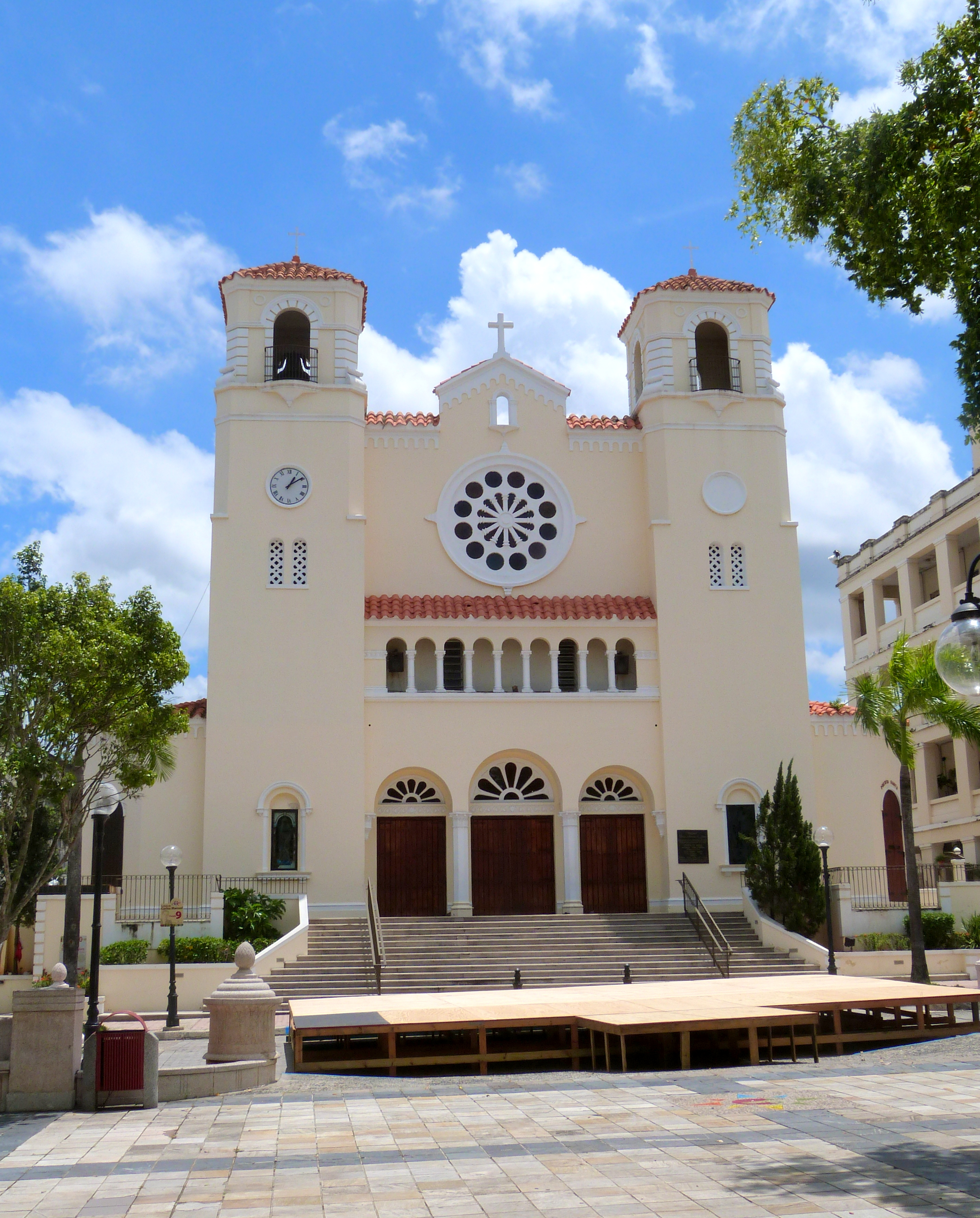
Caguas Cathedral (1930)

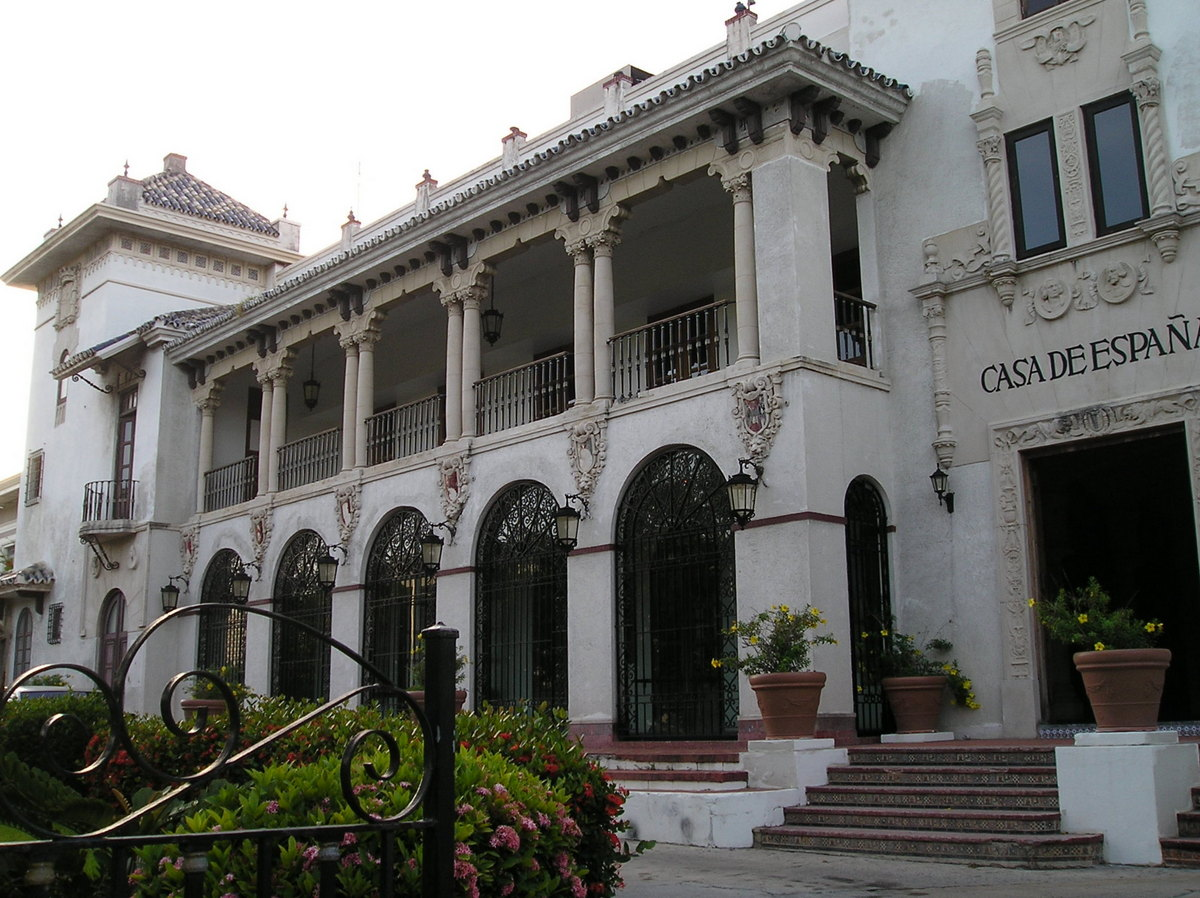
Casa de España (1934) in Puerta de Tierra

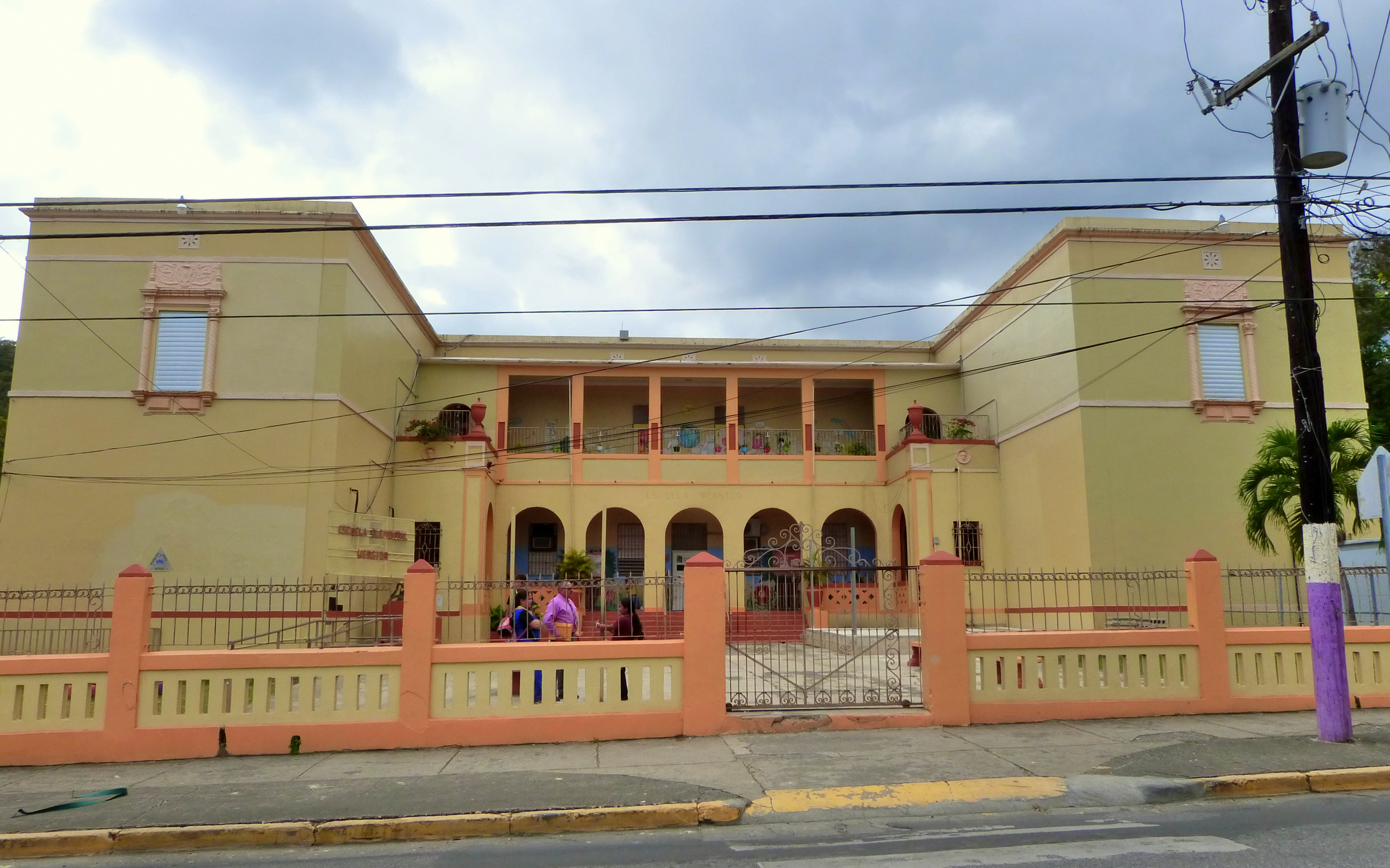
Daniel Webster School (1934) in Peñuelas

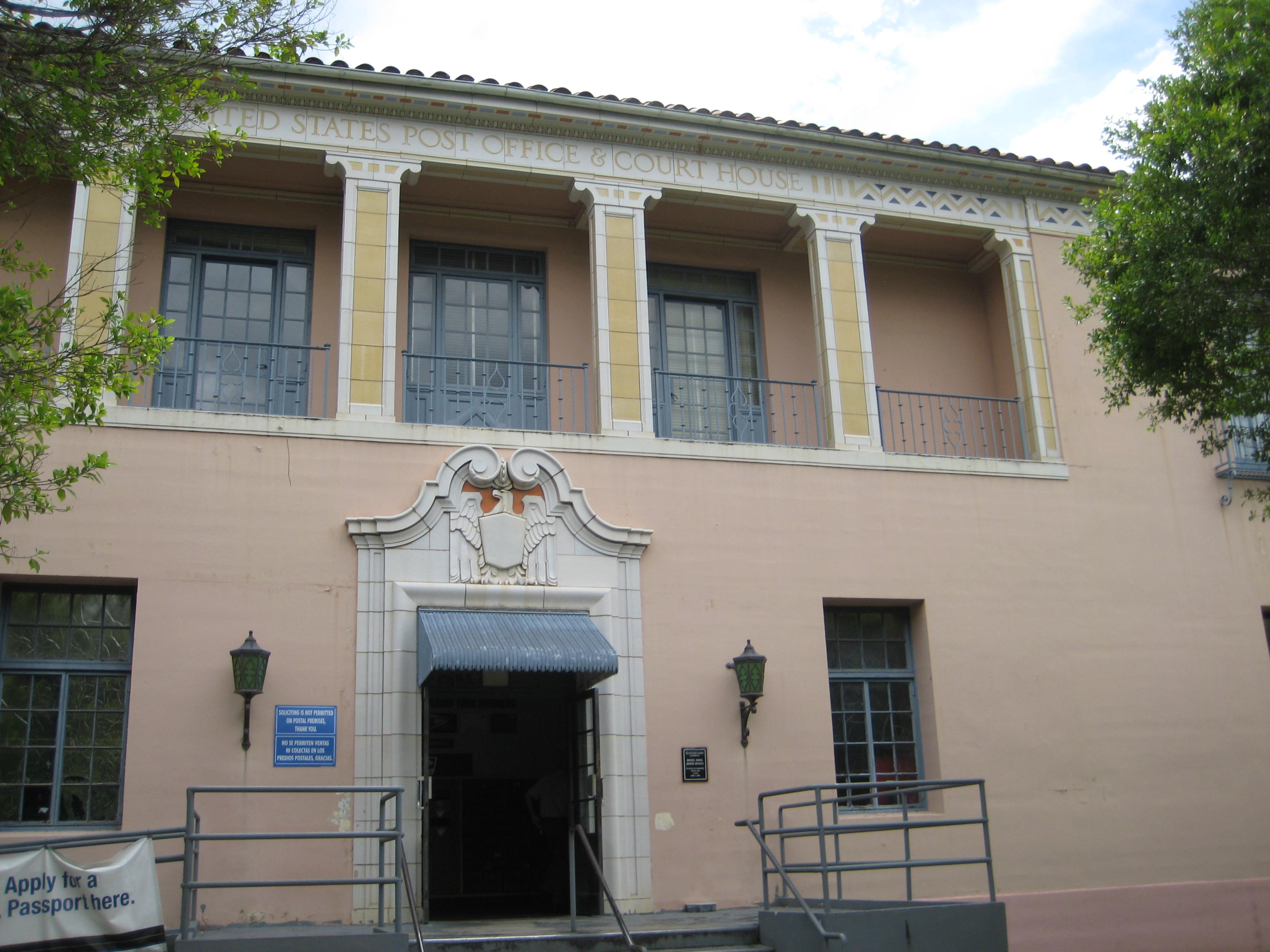
Miguel A. García Méndez Post Office Building (1935) in Mayagüez

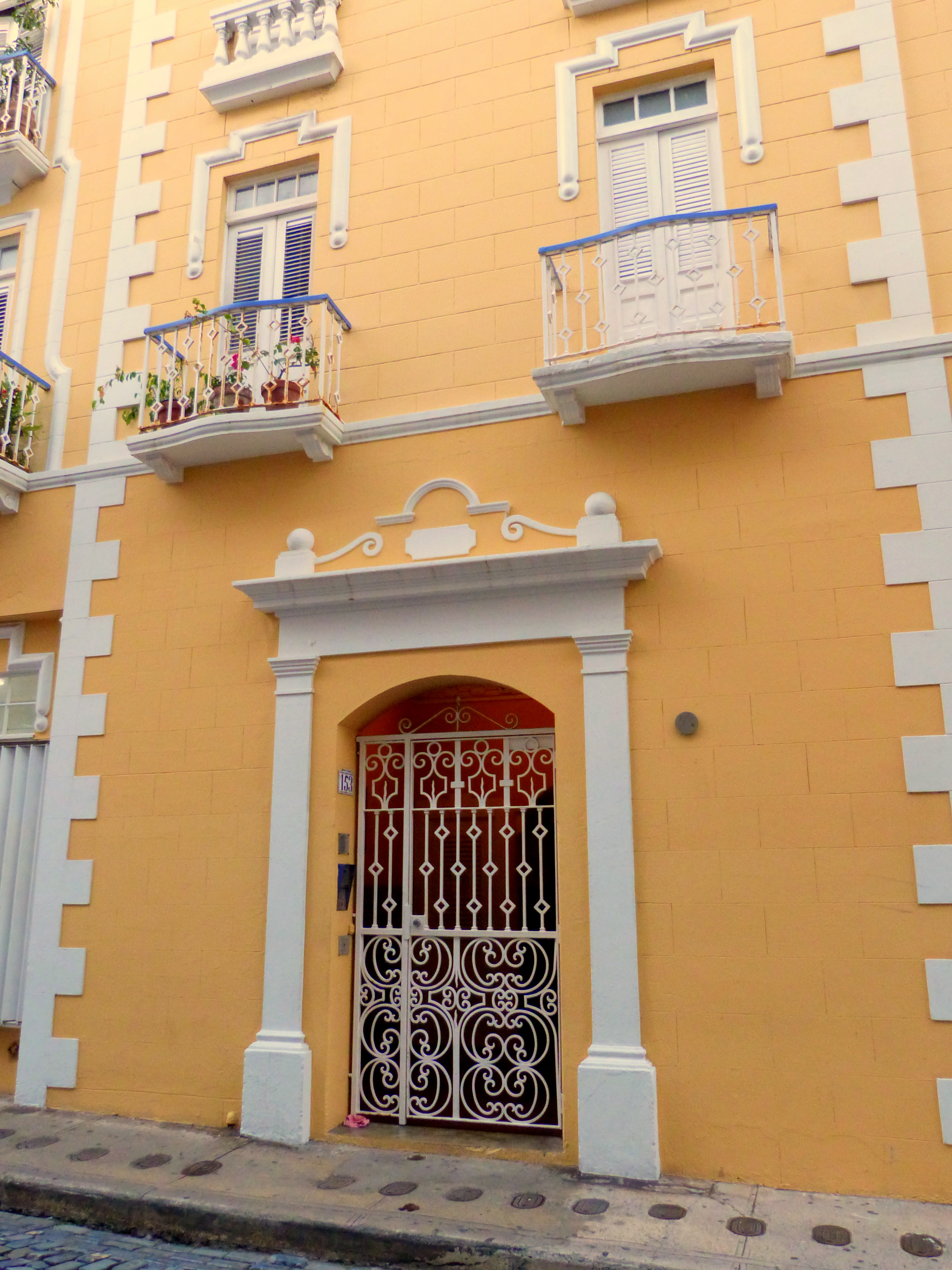
Patio Español (1937) in Old San Juan

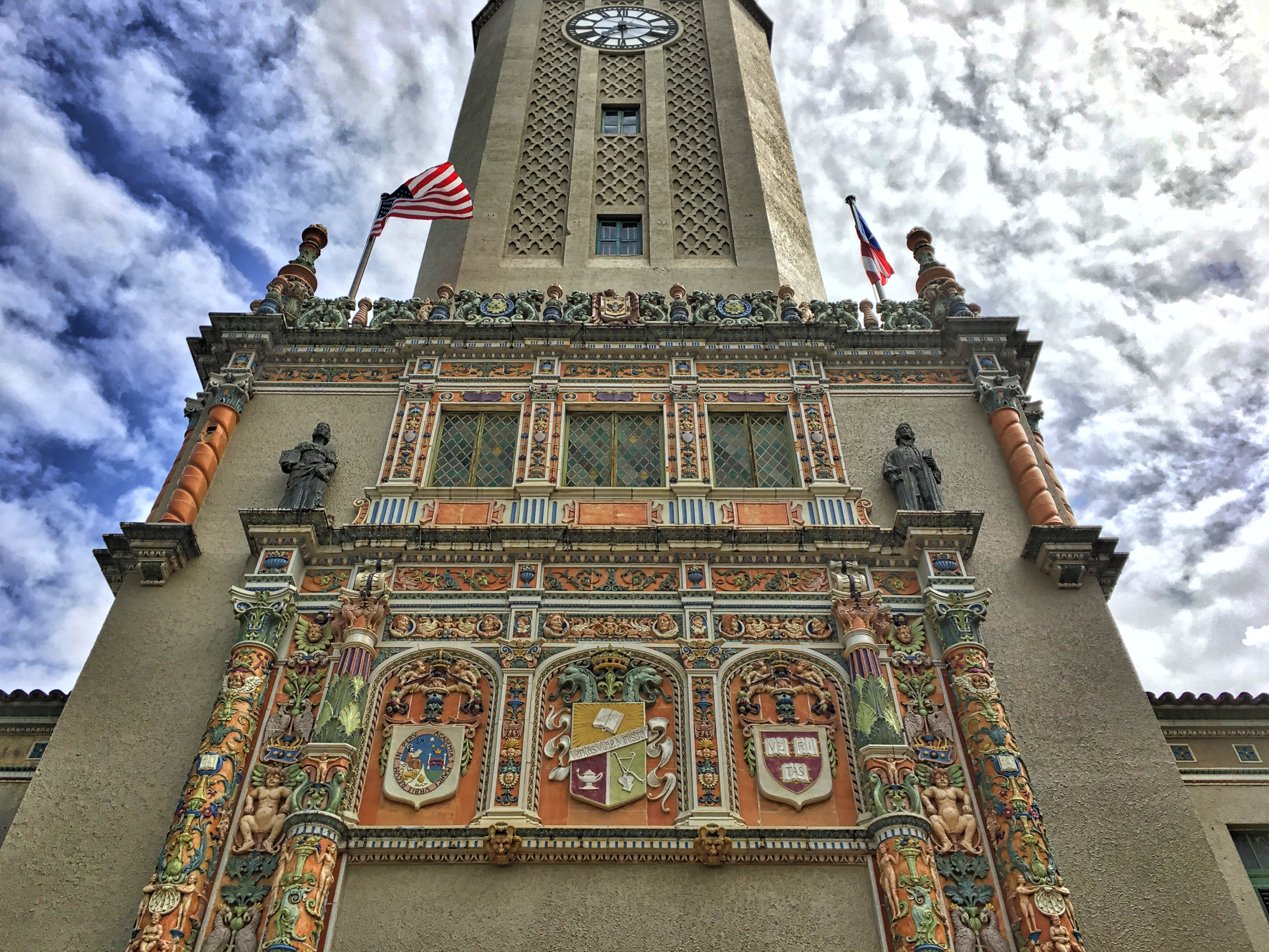
Roosevelt Tower (1937) in the UPR, Río Piedras

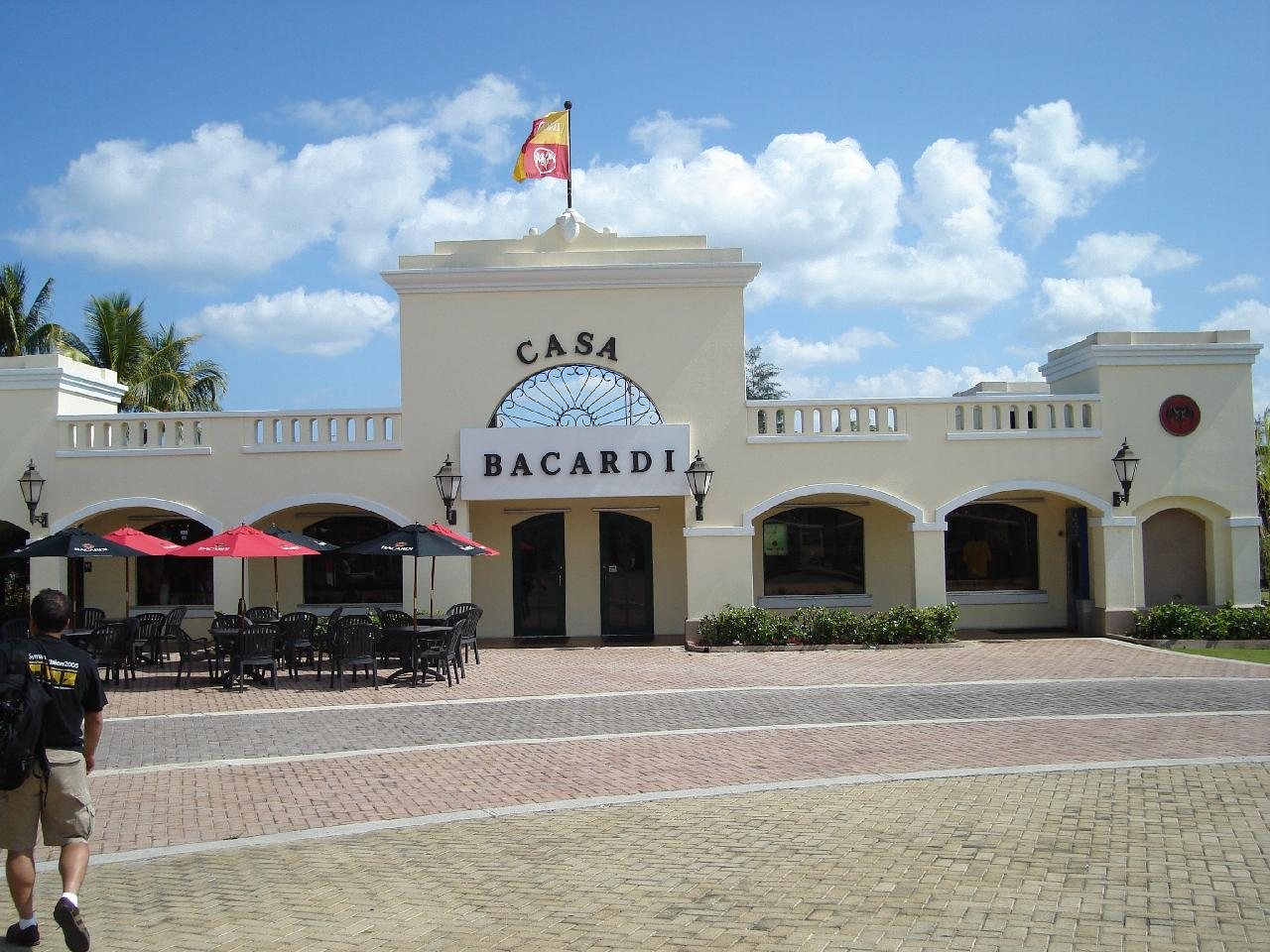
Casa Bacardí (1947) in Cataño

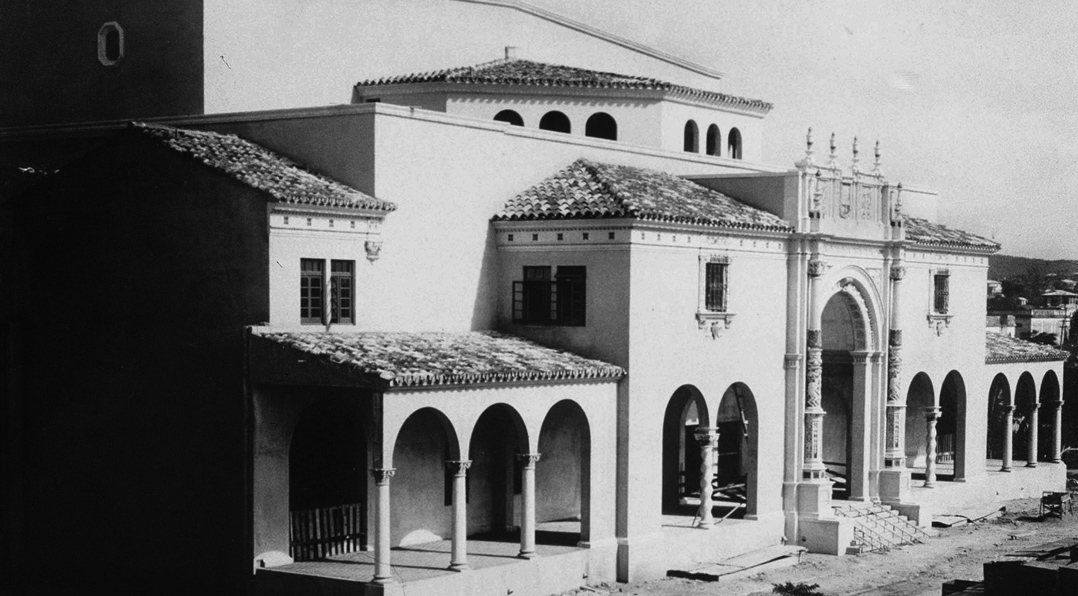
University of Puerto Rico Theater (1950) of the UPR, Río Piedras

=== Art Deco ===
Art Deco emerged in Puerto Rico in the 1920s and flourished in the 1930s as part of its transition towards modernity during the New Deal Era. A notable building of the time was the Puerto Rico Ilustrado–El Mundo Building in San Juan, established as the first high-rise building in the Puerto Rican capital. The functional vertical body, flat roofline and grid-like window and floor arrangement of this building took direct inspiration from the Commercial style of architecture developed in Chicago at the beginning of the century, however, its Spanish Revival-flavored ornamentation consists of geometric frieze lines characteristics of the modern Streamline designs popular in the United States at the time. Other high-rises built at the time, such as the first Banco Popular de Puerto Rico headquarters built in 1939, would follow this same trend. As such, the transitional characteristics of the first high-rises in San Juan demonstrated an evolution towards modernity while still preserving the Spanish and Caribbean flavors of the previous centuries, a trend that would continue throughout the rest of the century. Similar characteristics can be seen in industrial and commercial architecture, such as the Manatí Market Hall, designed by Rafael Carmoega and Fidel Sevillano, and built in 1925. The Great Depression and Second World War (and the New Deal) brought a rapid transition from rural to urban industries, greatly increasing the population of cities throughout the island. The cities of San Juan and Ponce saw the construction of by the Puerto Rico Reconstruction Administration (PRRA), a New Deal agency, established both public urban and suburban housing projects to manage the sudden need for housing throughout the island. Many of these projects incorporated subtle Art Deco styles which were popular at the time. Meanwhile, the use of Art Deco in the construction of municipal government buildings, cinemas, malls and office and apartment buildings also boomed in highly urbanized areas such as Ponce and in Santurce in San Juan. The style continued to be used after the end of the war while coinciding with the development of mid-century modernism.

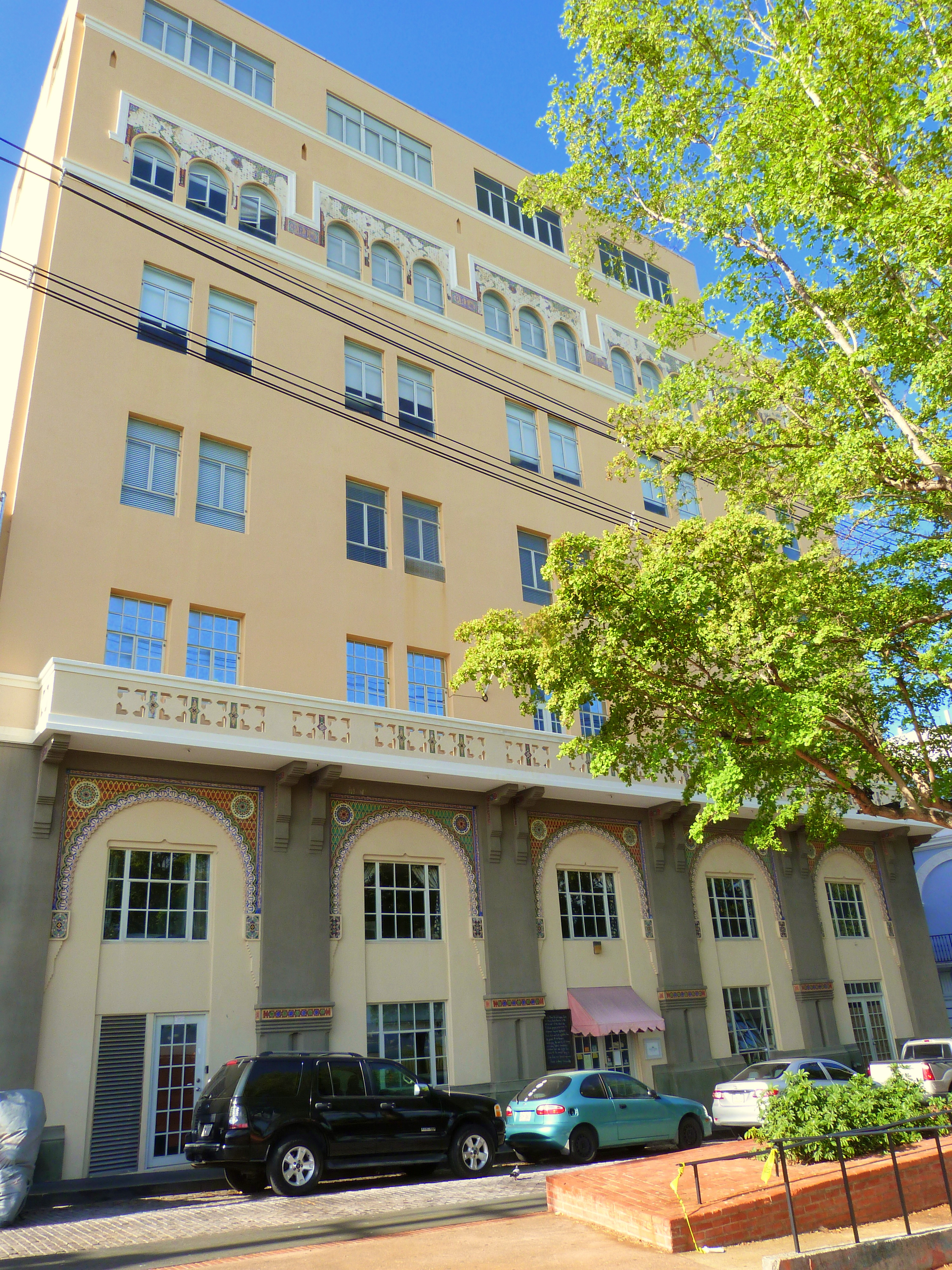
El Mundo Building (1923) in Old San Juan

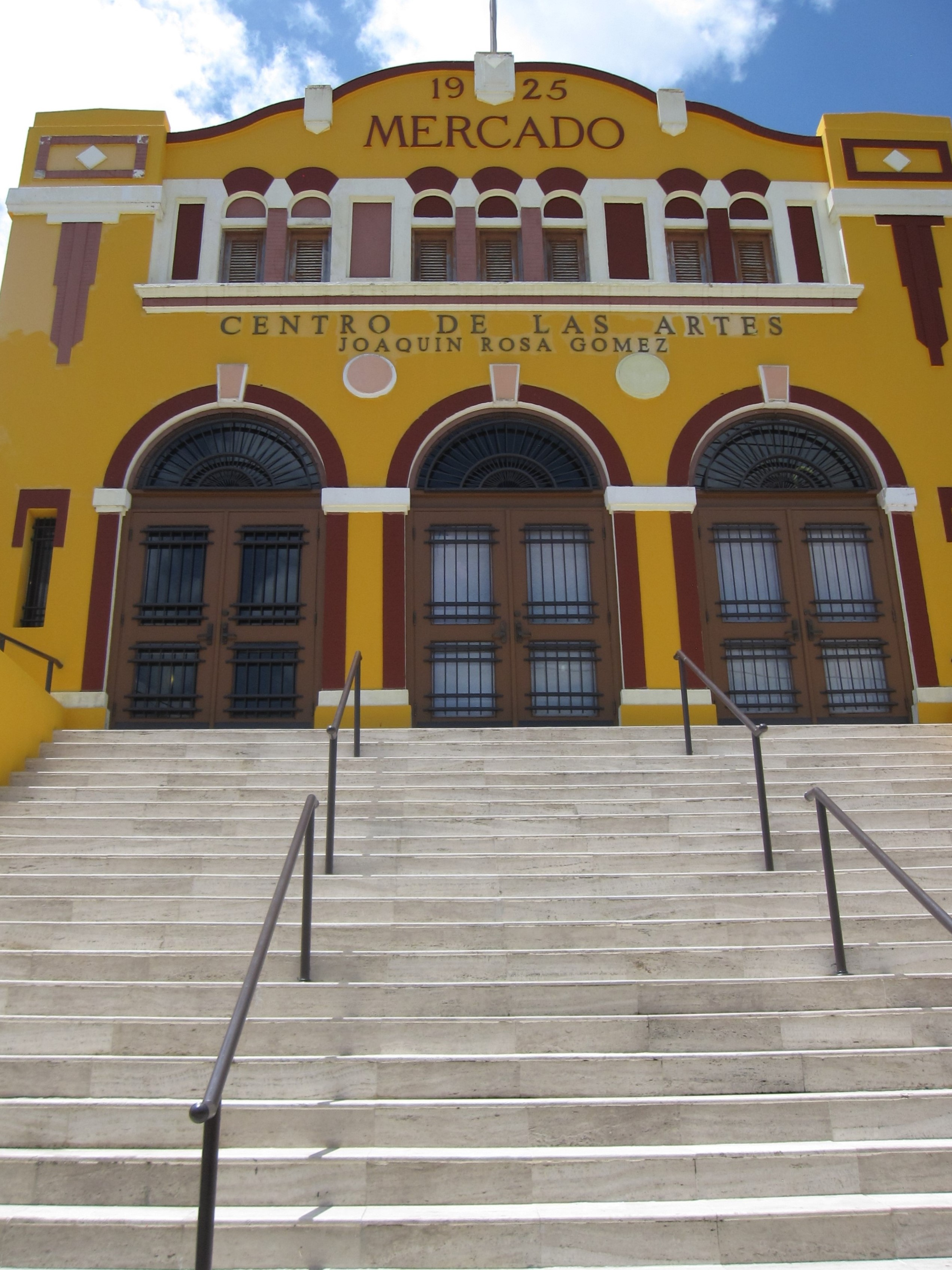
Manatí Marketplace (1925)

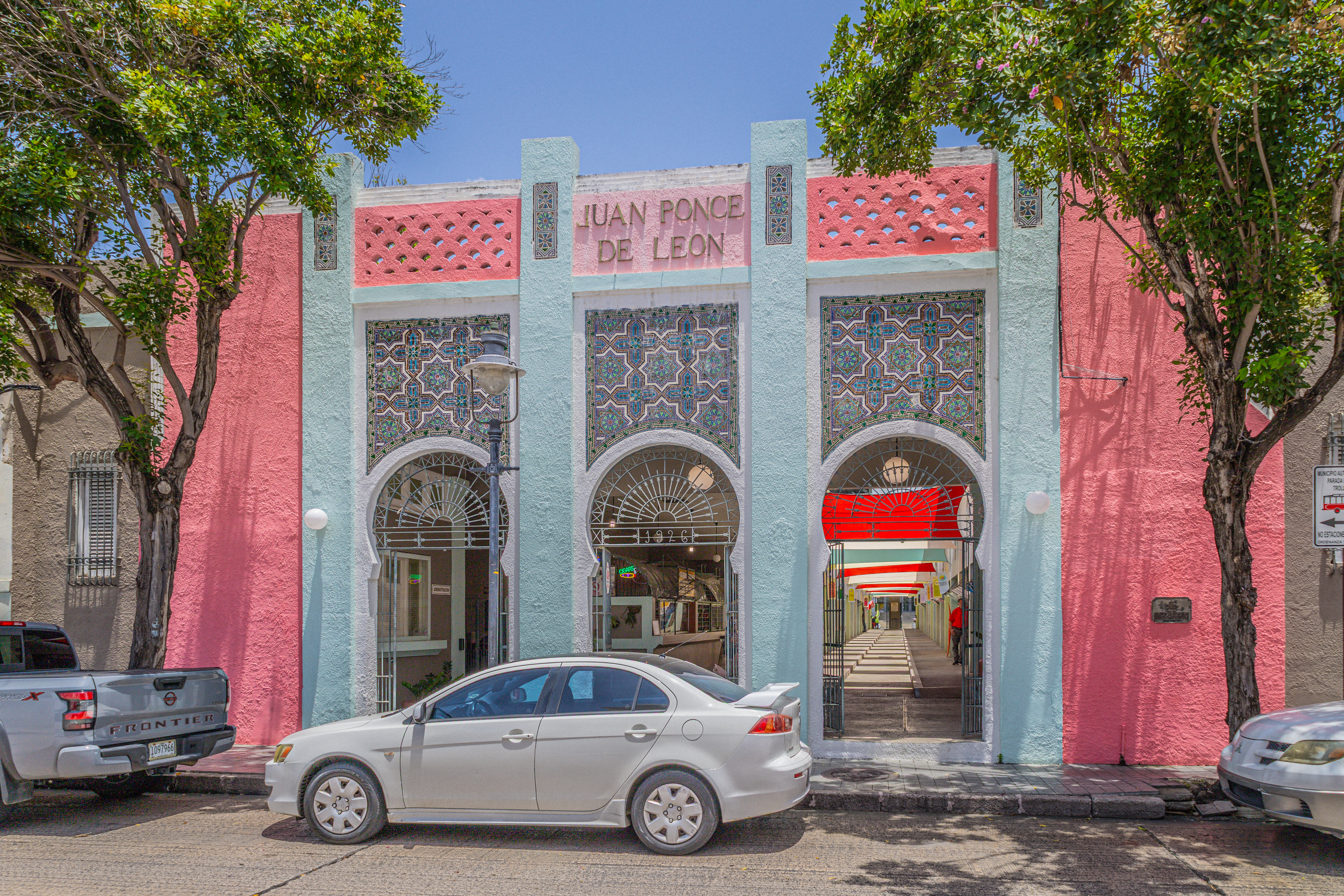
Mercado de las Carnes (1926) in Ponce

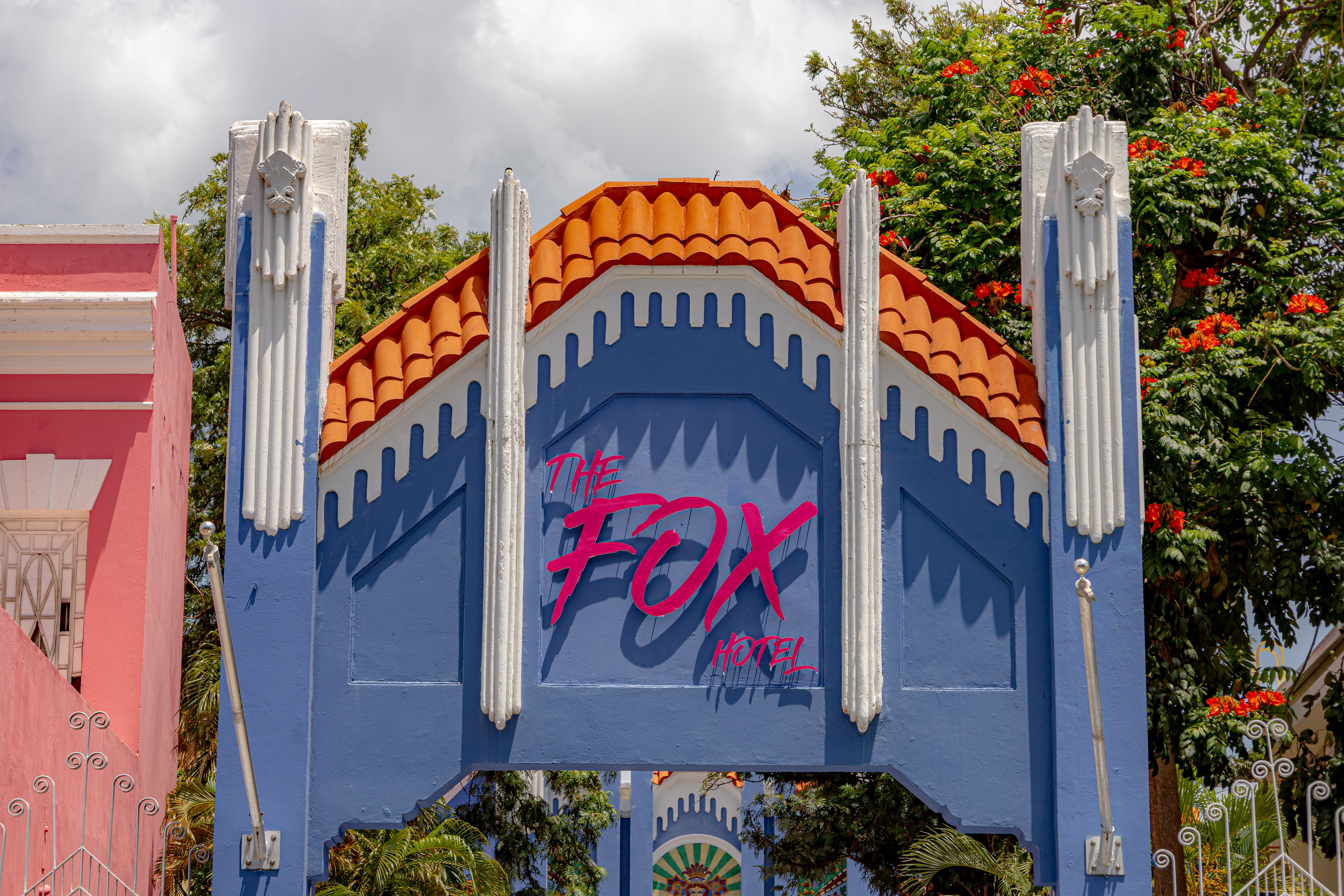
Fox Delicias (1931) in Ponce

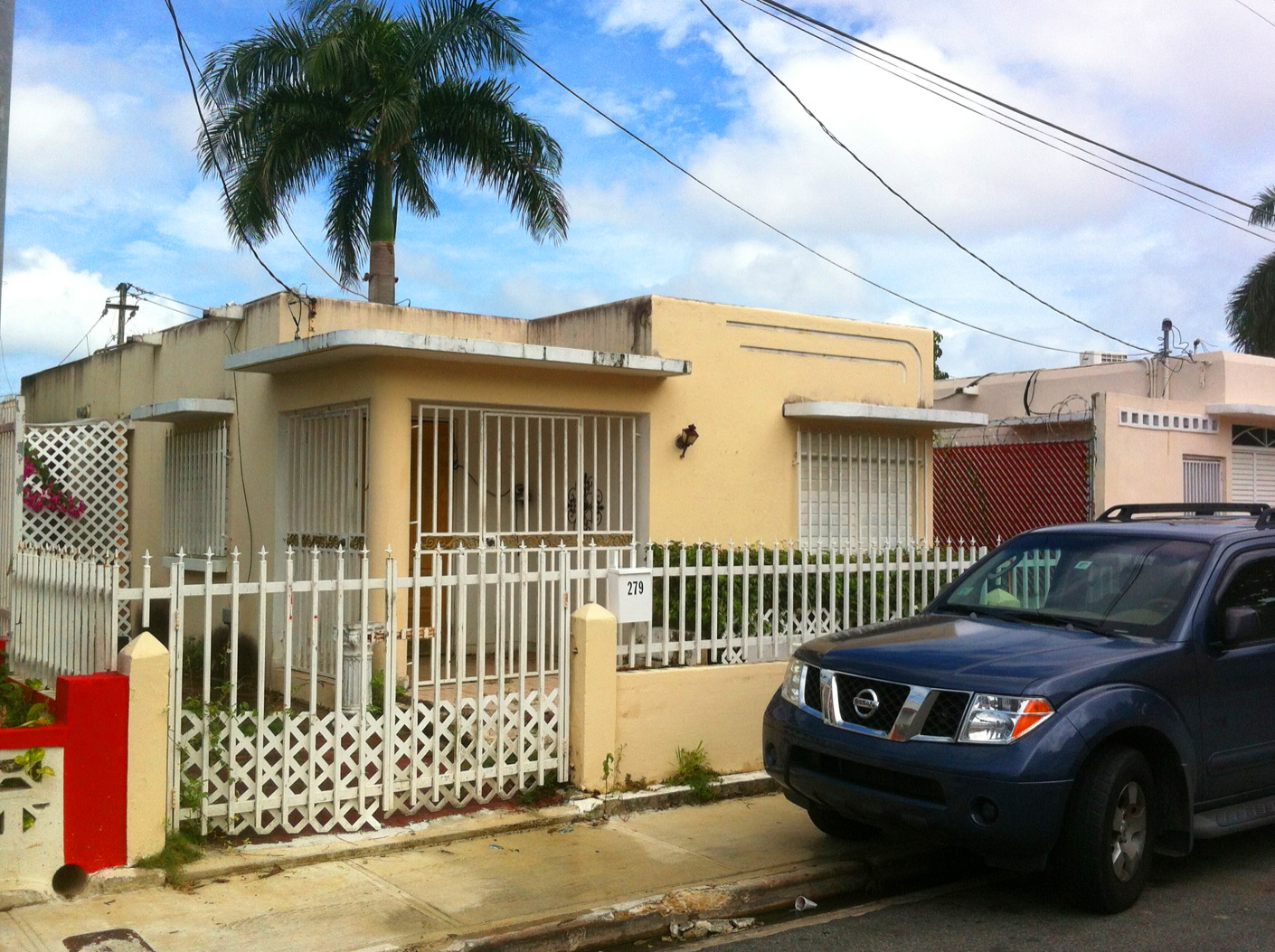
New Deal Era urban development (1936) in Hato Rey

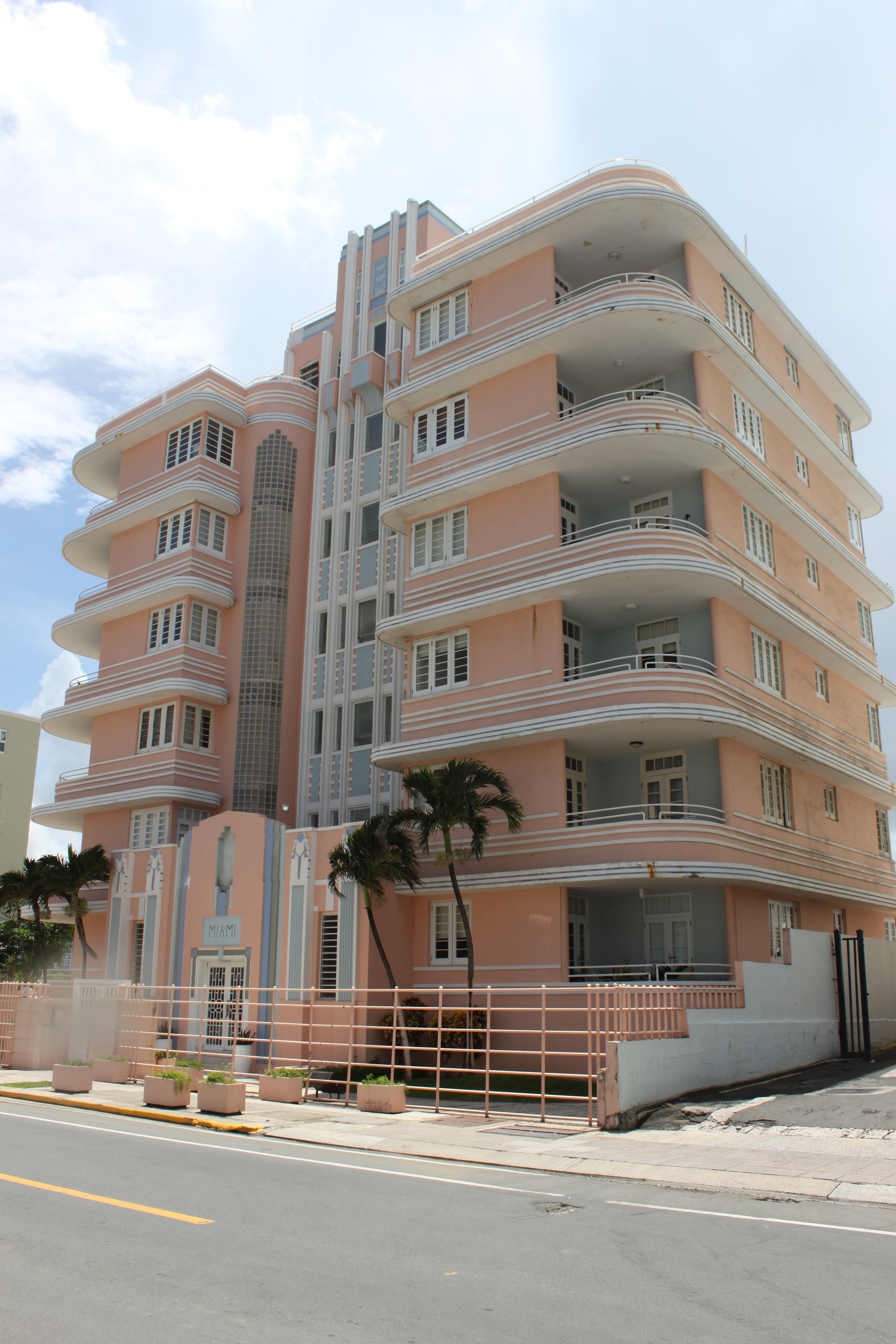
The Miami Building (1936) in Condado

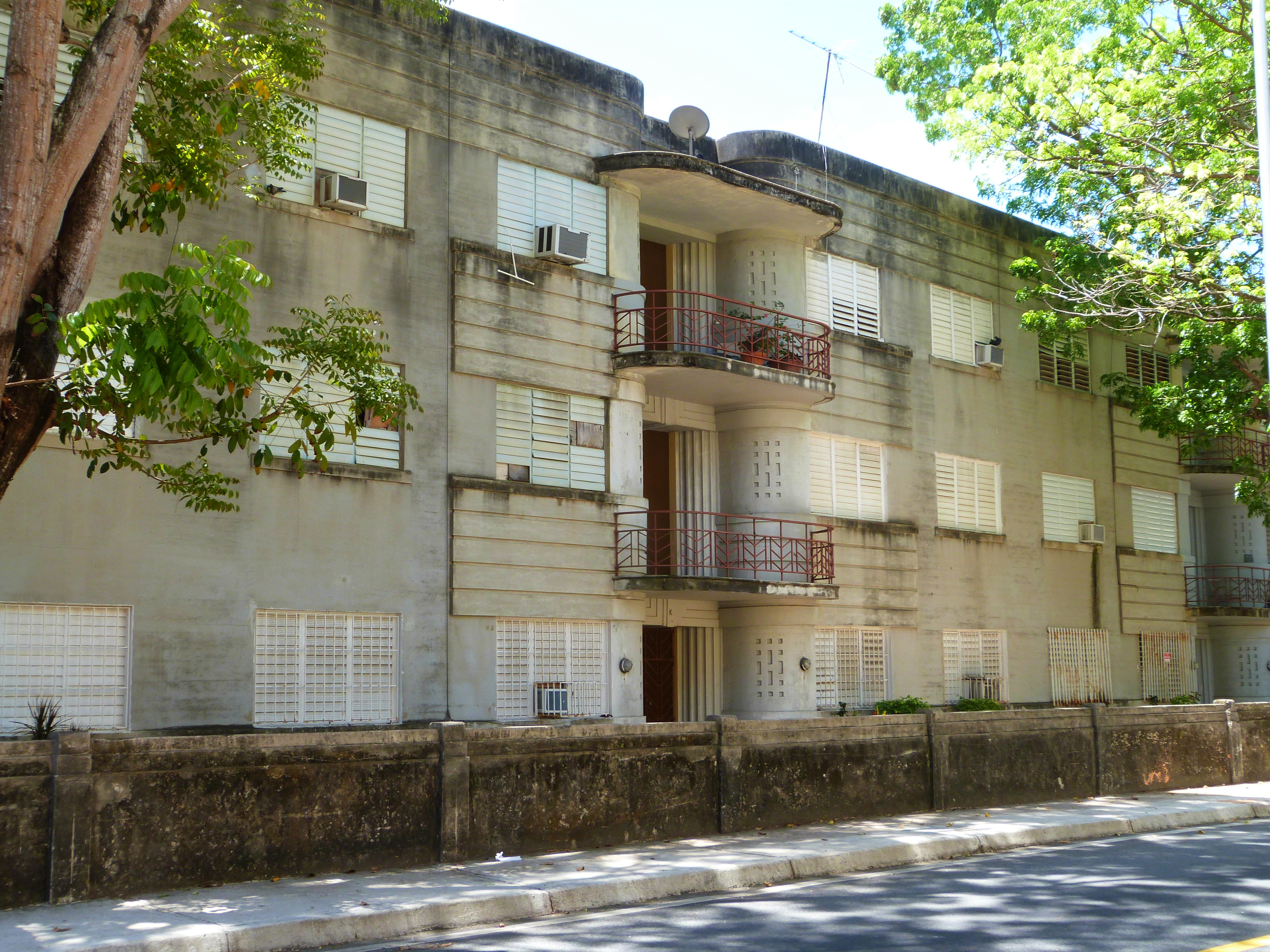
El Falansterio de Puerta de Tierra (1937)

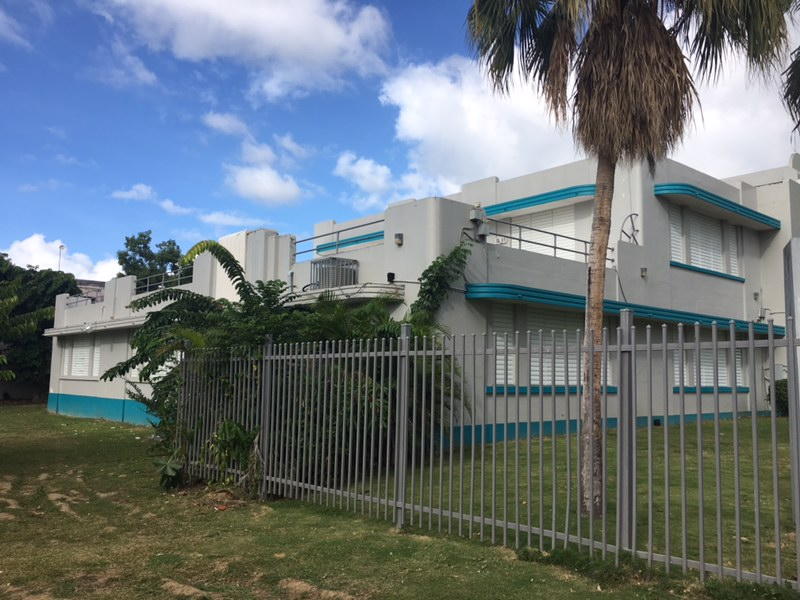
Aguayo Aldea Vocational High School (1939) in Caguas

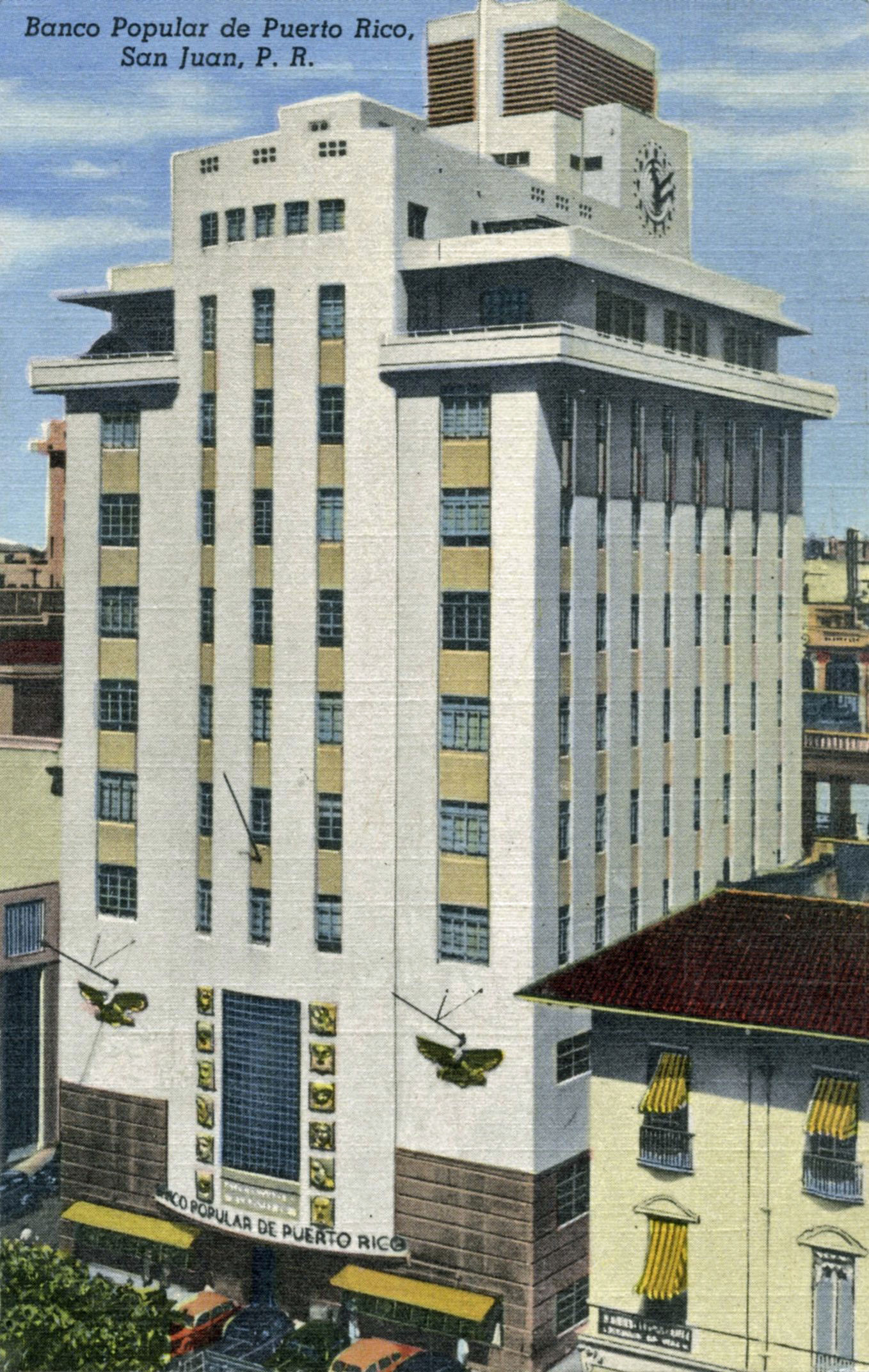
Banco Popular Building (1939) in Old San Juan

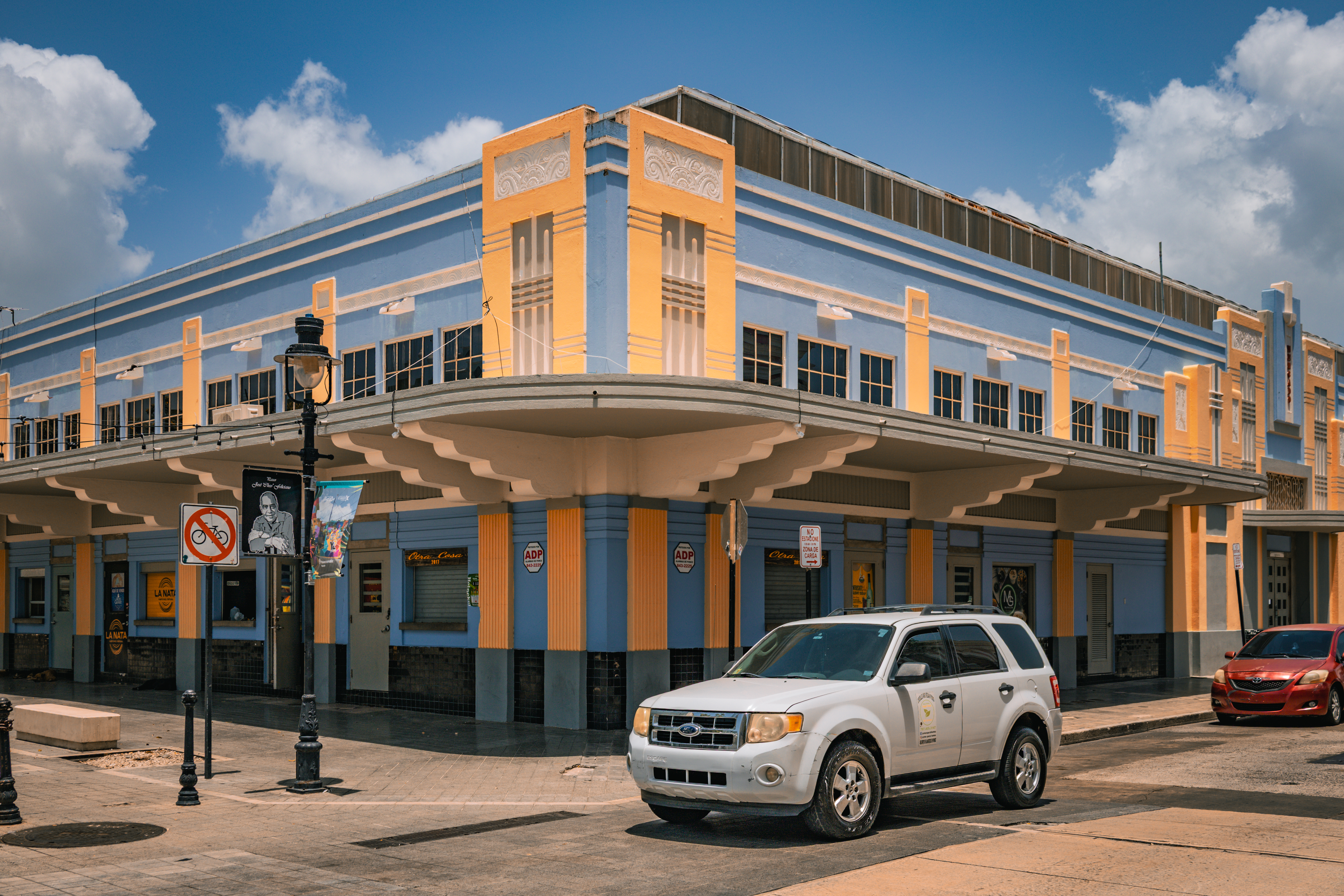
Plaza del Mercado de Ponce (1941)

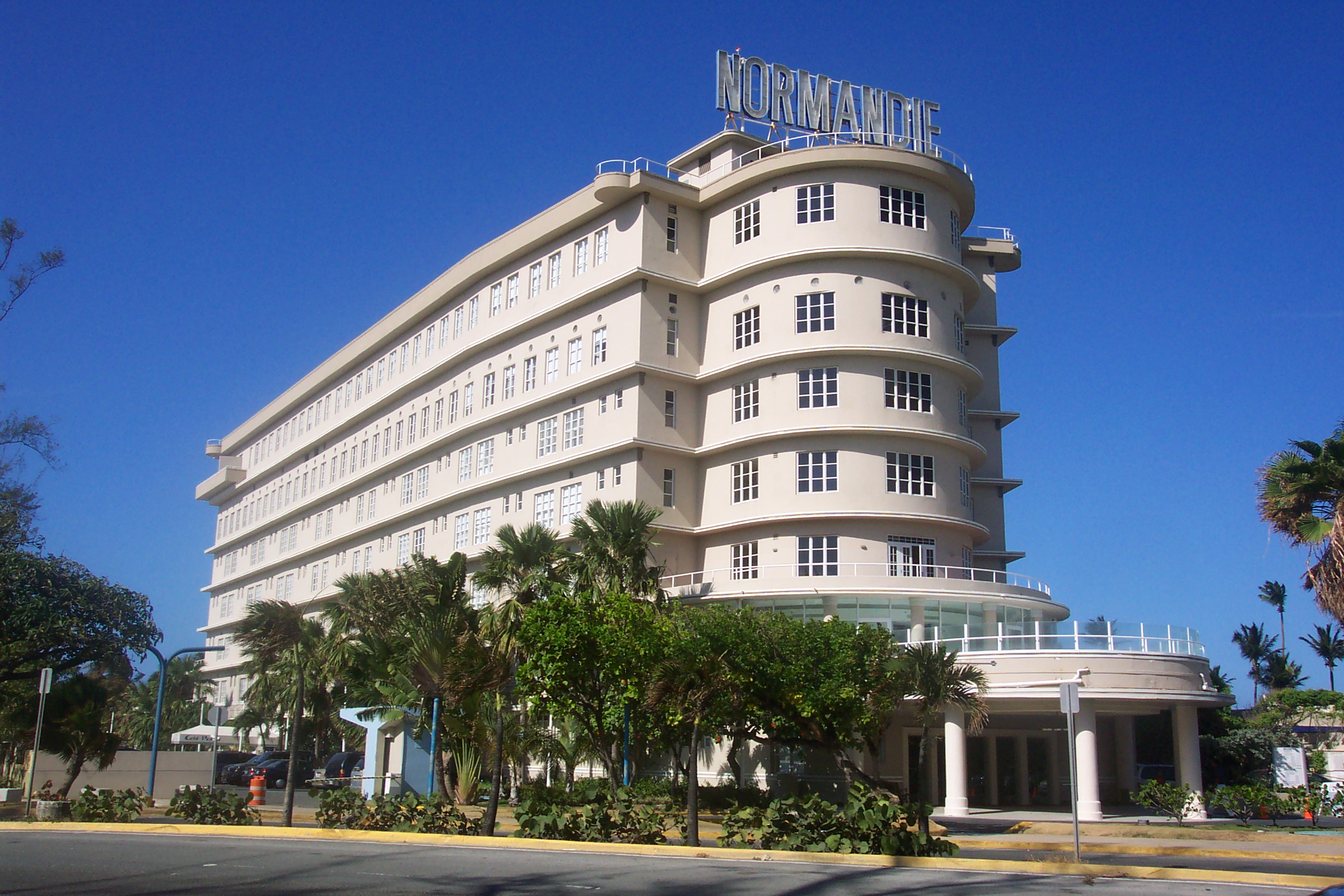
Normandie Hotel (1942) in Puerta de Tierra

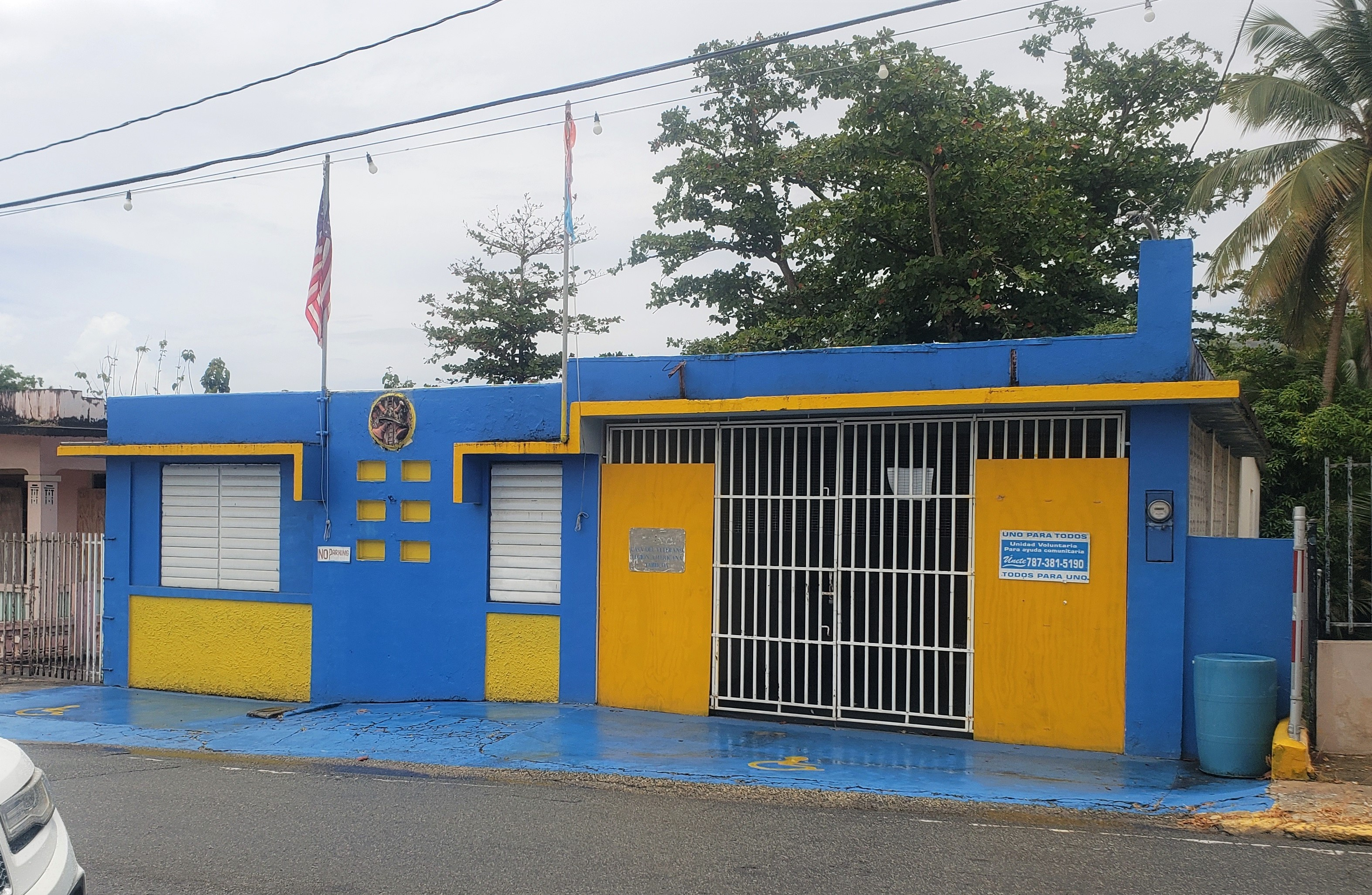
Parque de Bombas (1943) in Yabucoa

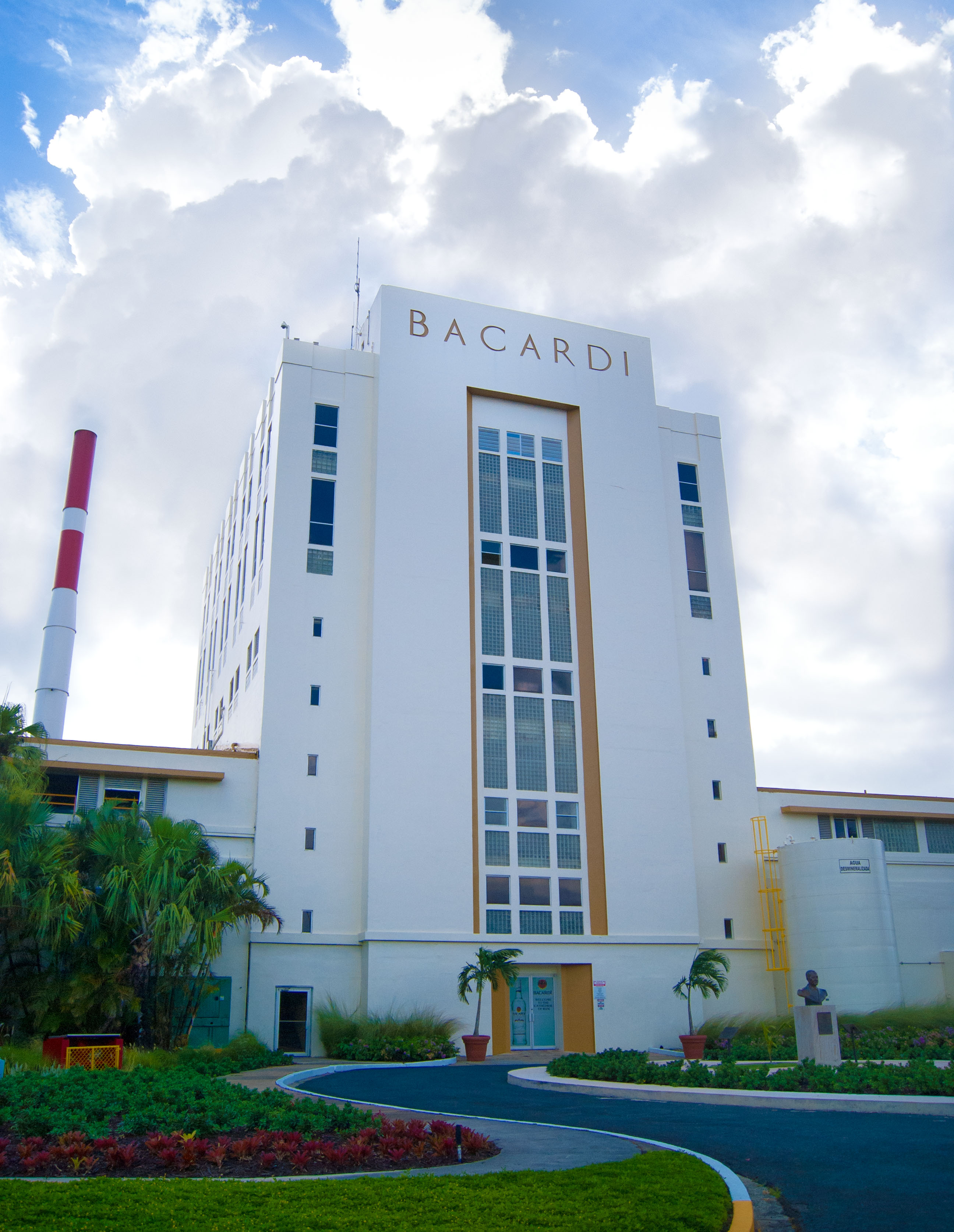
Bacardí Distillery (1947) in Cataño

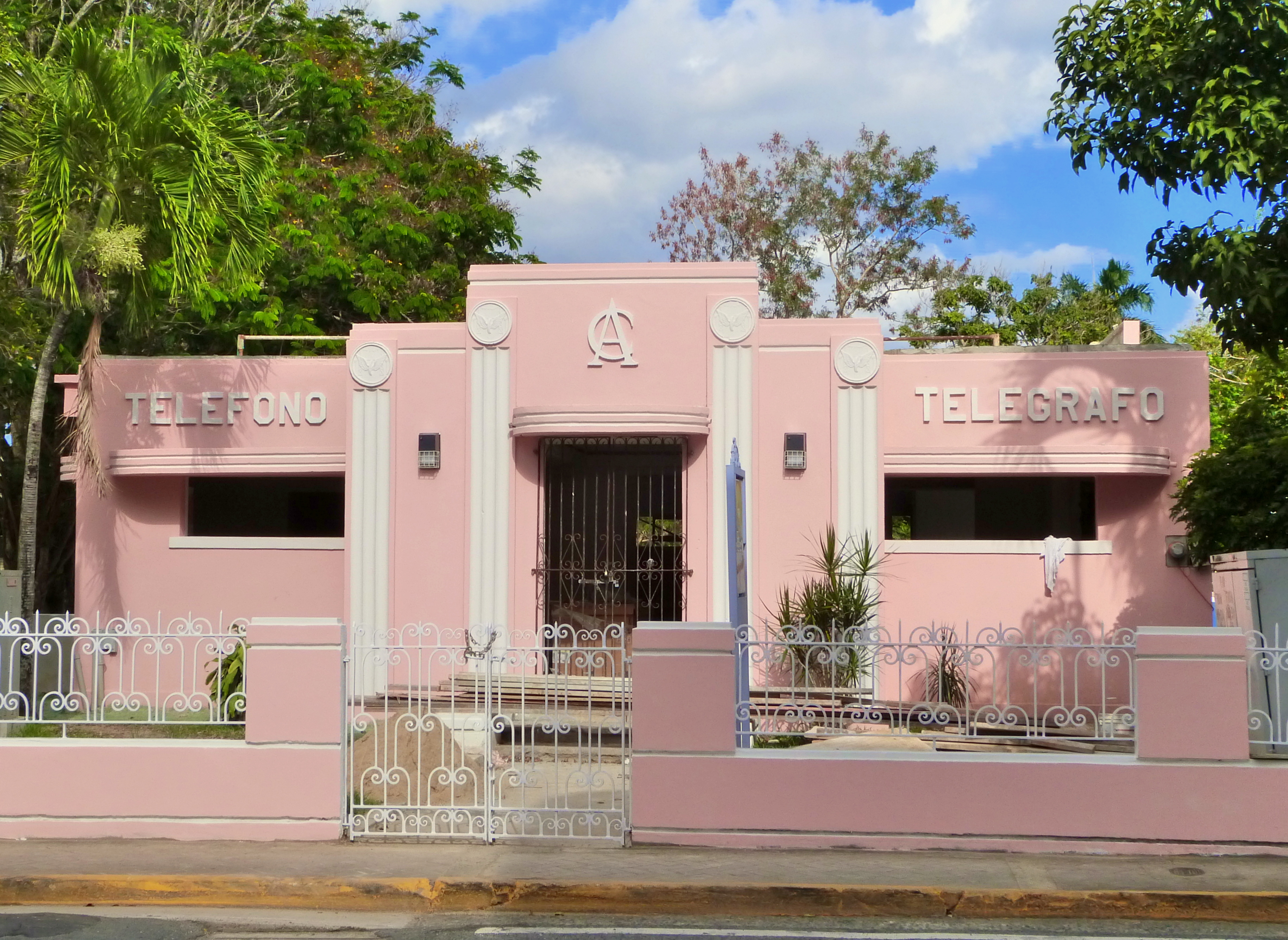
Telephone and Telegraph Station of Guaynabo (1948)

== Post-War/Modernist Period ==
The conclusion of the Second World War marked a rapid modernization of Puerto Rico, primarily ushered by the ambitious industrial and economic development programs of Operation Bootstrap (Operación Manos a la Obra). These development programs, managed by both the federal government of the United States and the Puerto Rico Industrial Development Company (PRIDCO), sought to fully transform the economy of the island from an agricultural-based to a fully industrialized one. The rapid development of secondary and tertiary sectors brought about the establishment of factories, banks, retail and real estate, consequently shifting construction styles away from eclectic revivalist architecture and more towards uniform architectural designs that emphasized efficiency, utilitarianism and the showcase of new materials such as reinforced concrete and glass. Government-led housing projects, schools and hospitals built at the time often reflected International Style principles, while tropical adaptations to Modernism adjusted bolder contemporary styles to hotels, office buildings and event venues.

=== International Style ===
The International Style quickly became one of the dominant architectural languages between the 1940s and 1970s. Its simplistic yet industrialist aesthetics aligned perfectly with the industrialization ideals of Operation Bootstrap. Characterized by its rectilinear forms, curtain walls and use of glass and concrete was adopted throughout commercial and institutional projects in Puerto Rico, with architects such as Henry Klumb becoming some of its earliest proponents in the island. The style was most popular in the number of factories built throughout the island in the 1950s, but it was also applied in high-rise financial and government office buildings in the 1960s, such as those erected in the then-newly established Hato Rey financial district of San Juan (today referred to as 'the Golden Mile' in English or Milla de Oro in Spanish), designed to project corporate strength and financial stability.

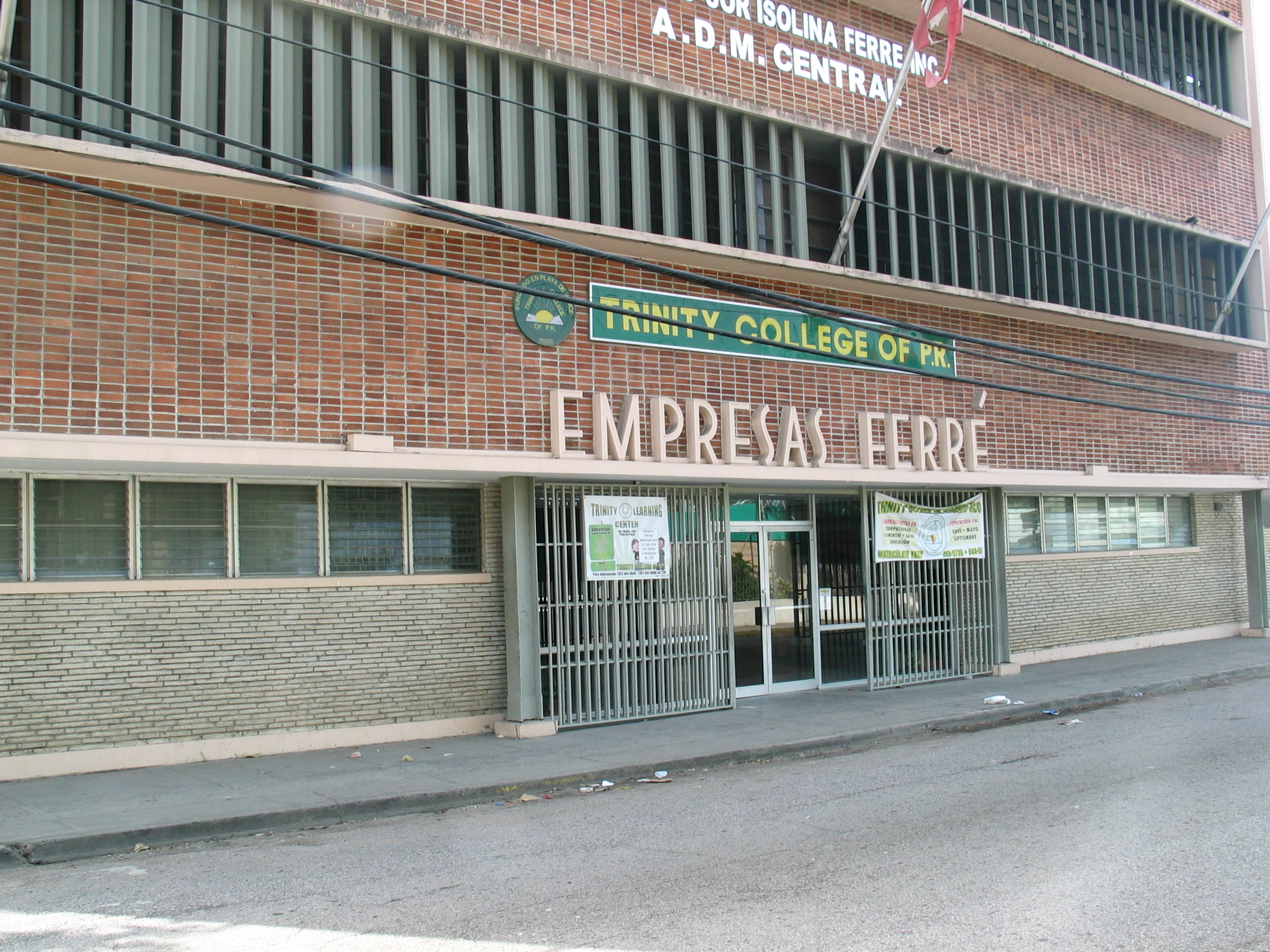
Empresas Ferré Building (1953) in Ponce

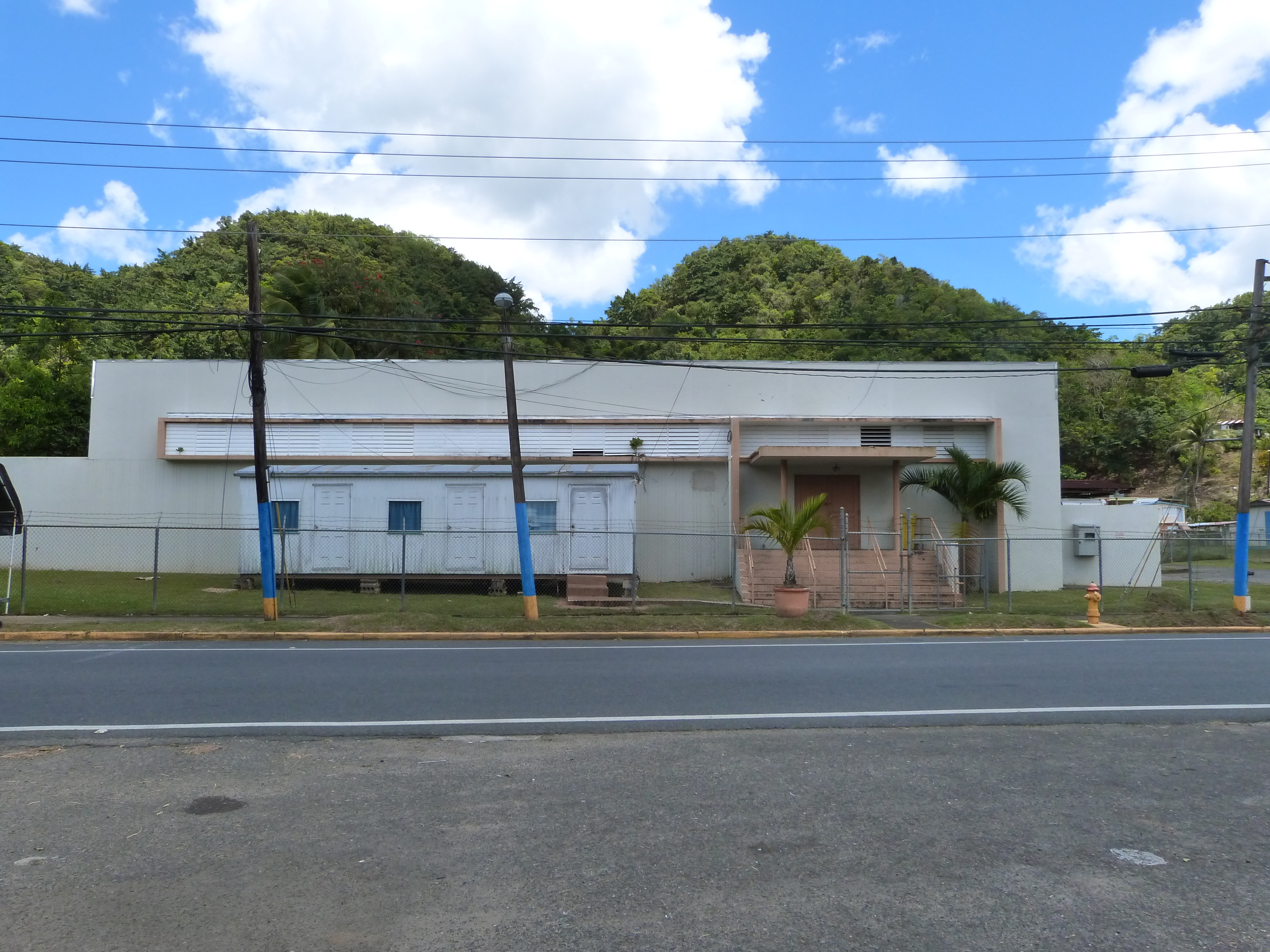
De Luxe Manufacturing Plant (1958) in Florida

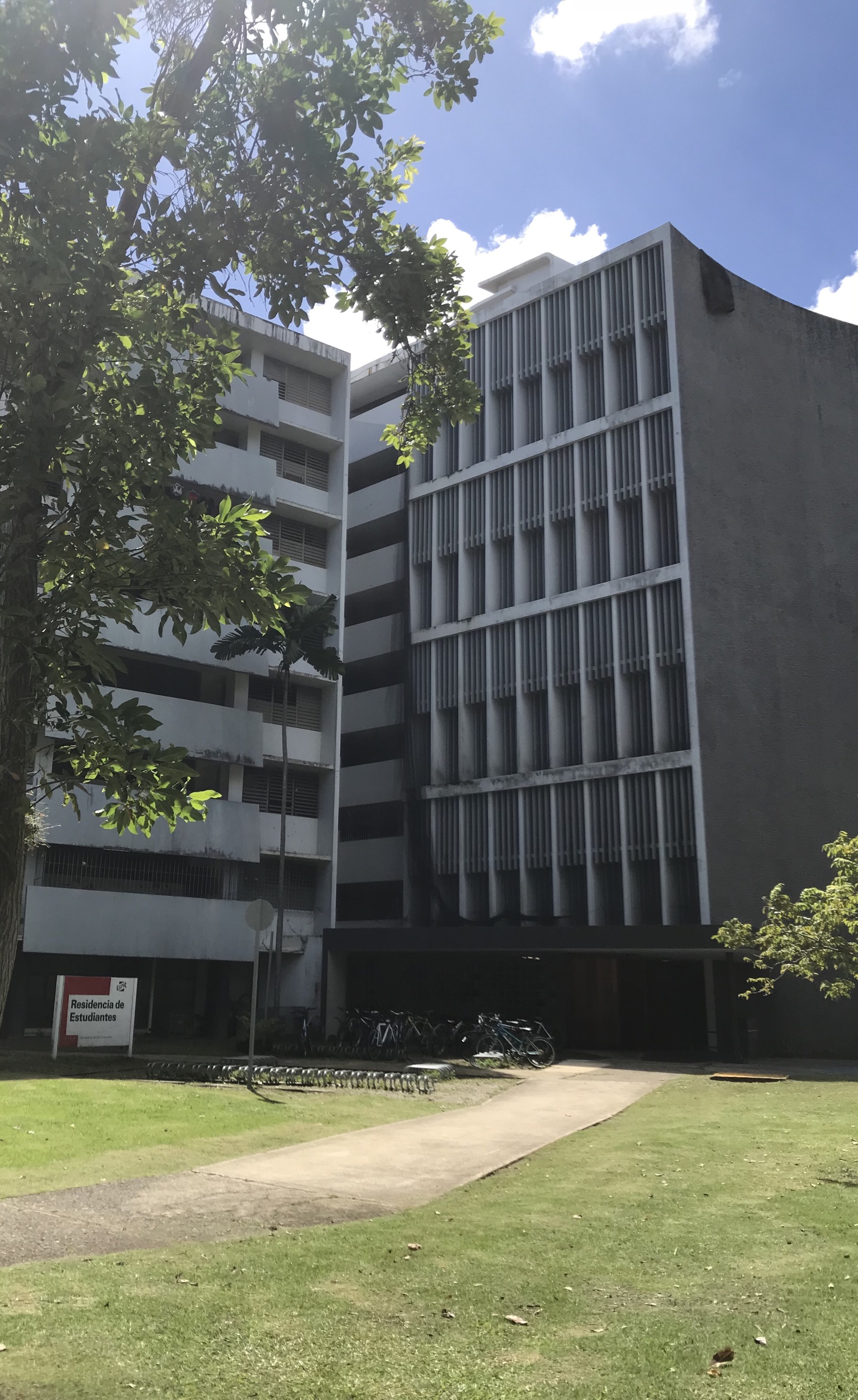
Residencia de Señoritas dormitory hall (1960) of UPR, Río Piedras

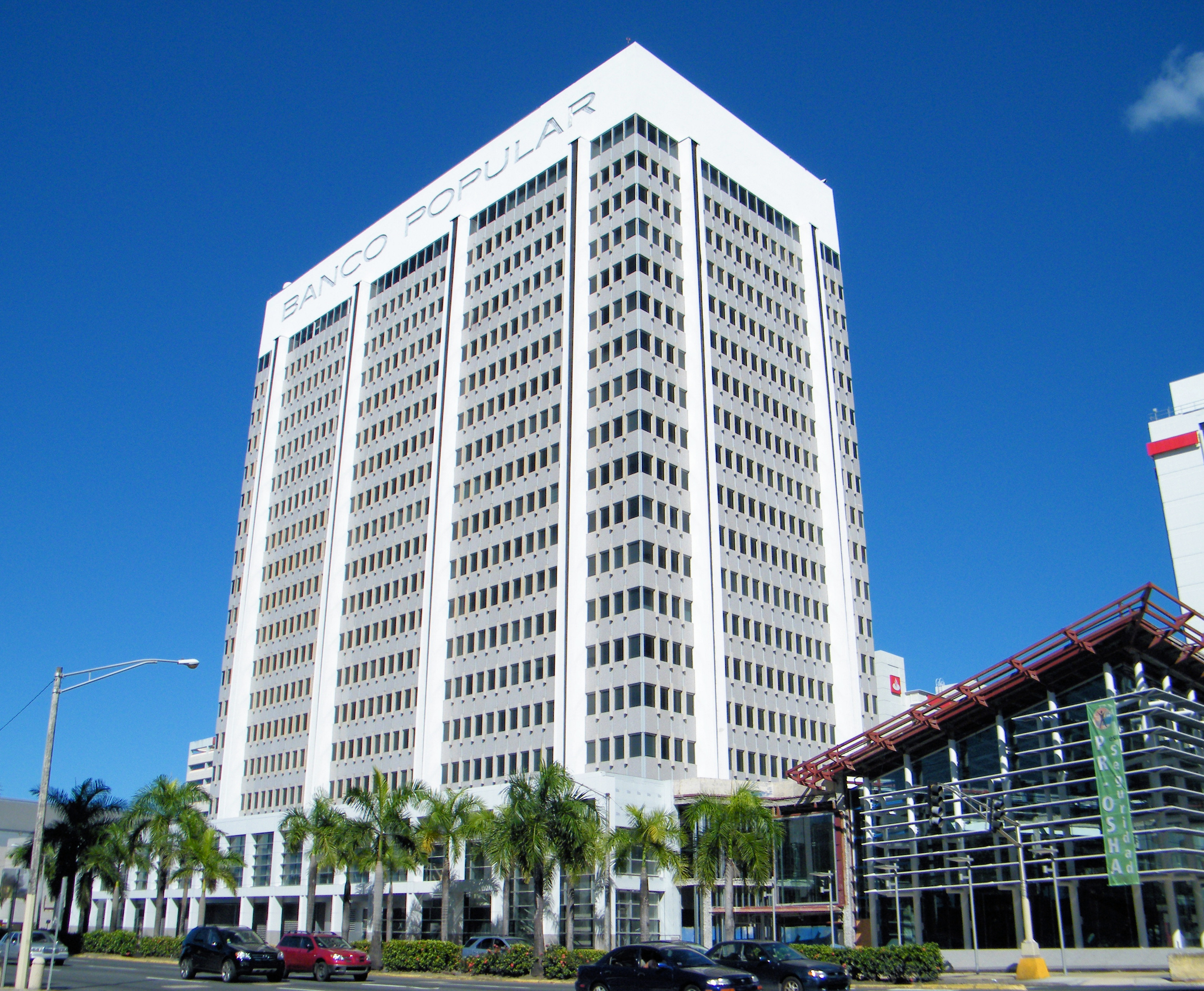
Popular Center (1965) in Hato Rey

The decade of the 1950s also witnessed the adaptation of this uniform International Style into the tropical needs and aesthetics of Puerto Rico. Henry Klumb, inspired by the "organic mindfulness" of his mentor Frank Lloyd Wright, became famous in the island at the time for his architectural designs of deep overhangs, brise-soleil and cross-ventilation systems, ideal for the sunny and humid climate of the Caribbean. Some of his most famous projects of the time include several buildings of the Bacardí Distillery campus (1947–1960) and the Sanctuary of Blessed Martín de Porres (1950) in Cataño, Colegio San Ignacio de Loyola (1952) in San Juan, and numerous halls, offices, libraries and venues in the Río Piedras and Mayagüez campuses of the University of Puerto Rico (1950–1974). Puerto Rico-born architects such as Osvaldo Toro and Miguel Ferrer further cemented elements of tropical modernism in what soon became the Puerto Rican interpretation of this style, which soon became a visual shorthand for the modernization of San Juan and the island up to the 1970s.

Tropical Modernism

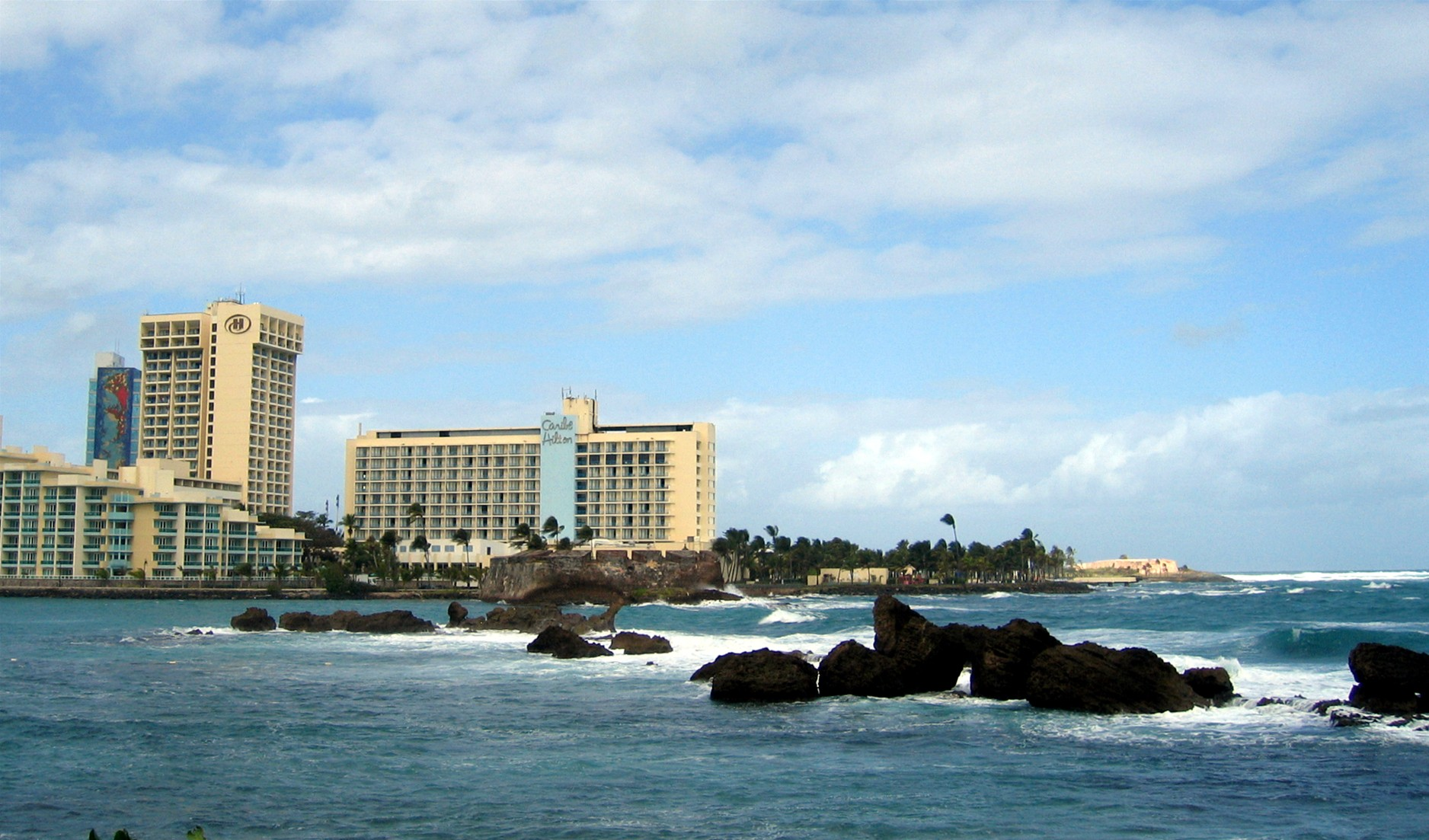
Caribe Hilton (1949) in Puerta de Tierra

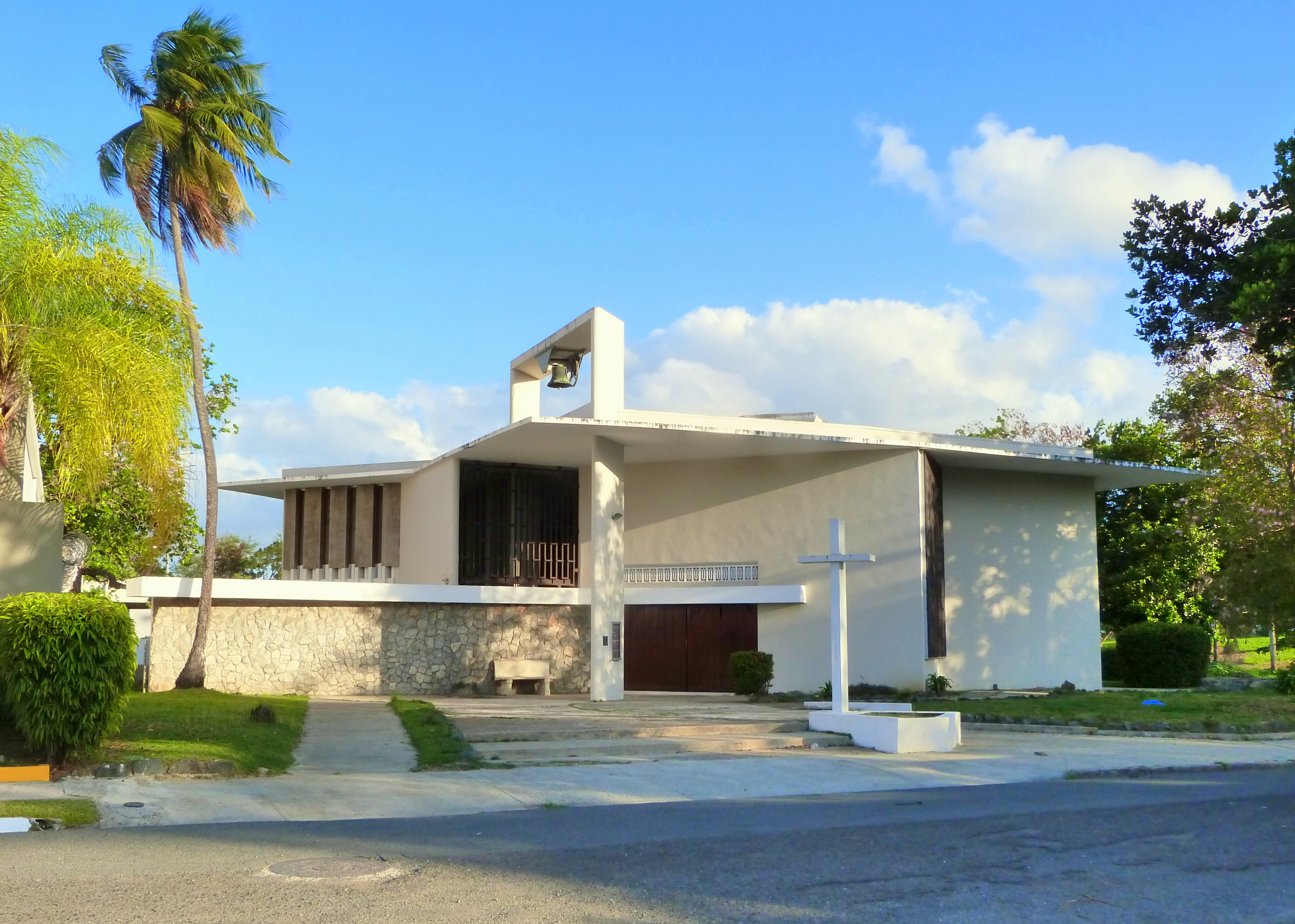
Sanctuary of Blessed Martín de Porres (1950) in Cataño

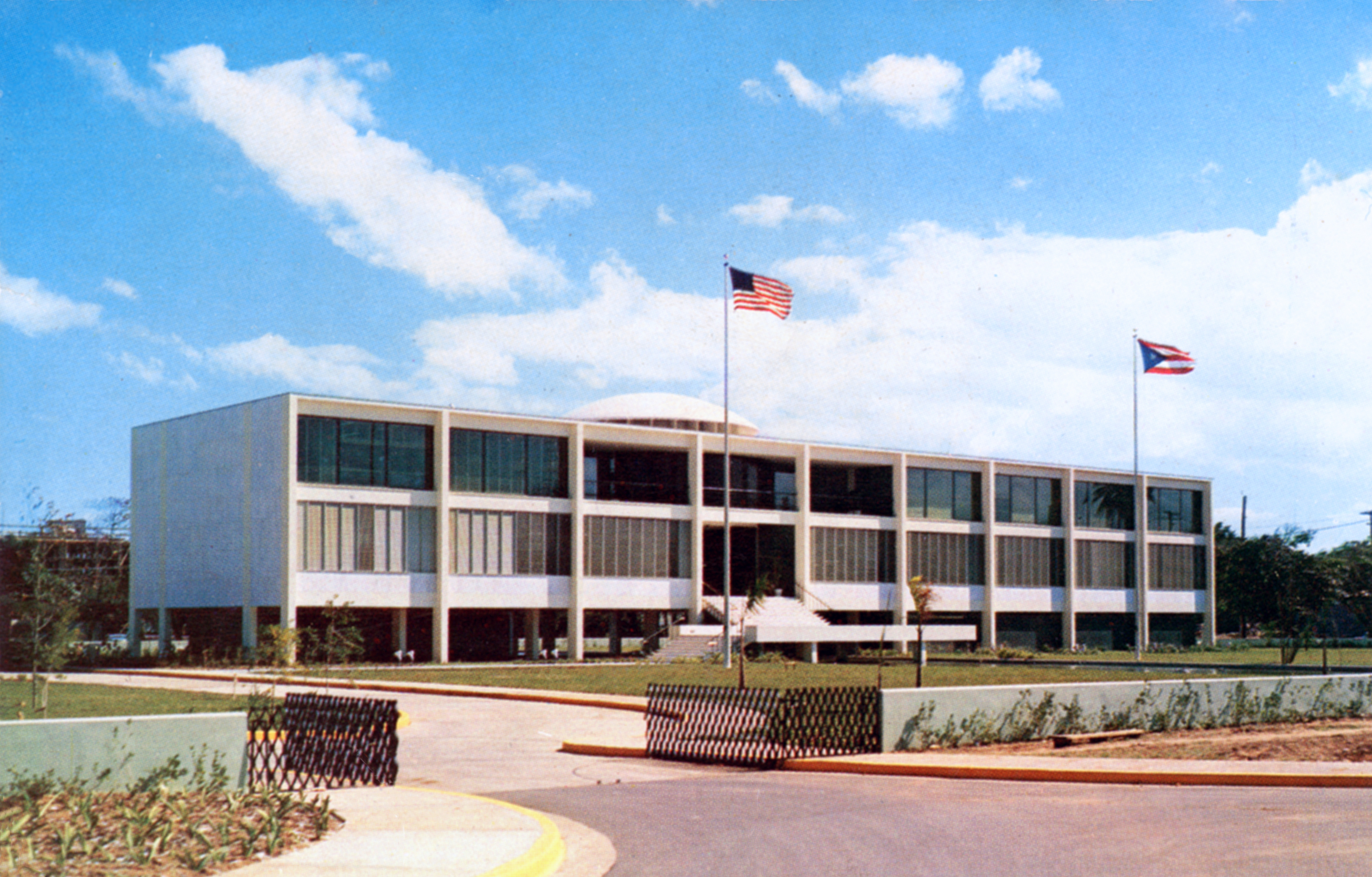
Supreme Court Building (1955) in Puerta de Tierra

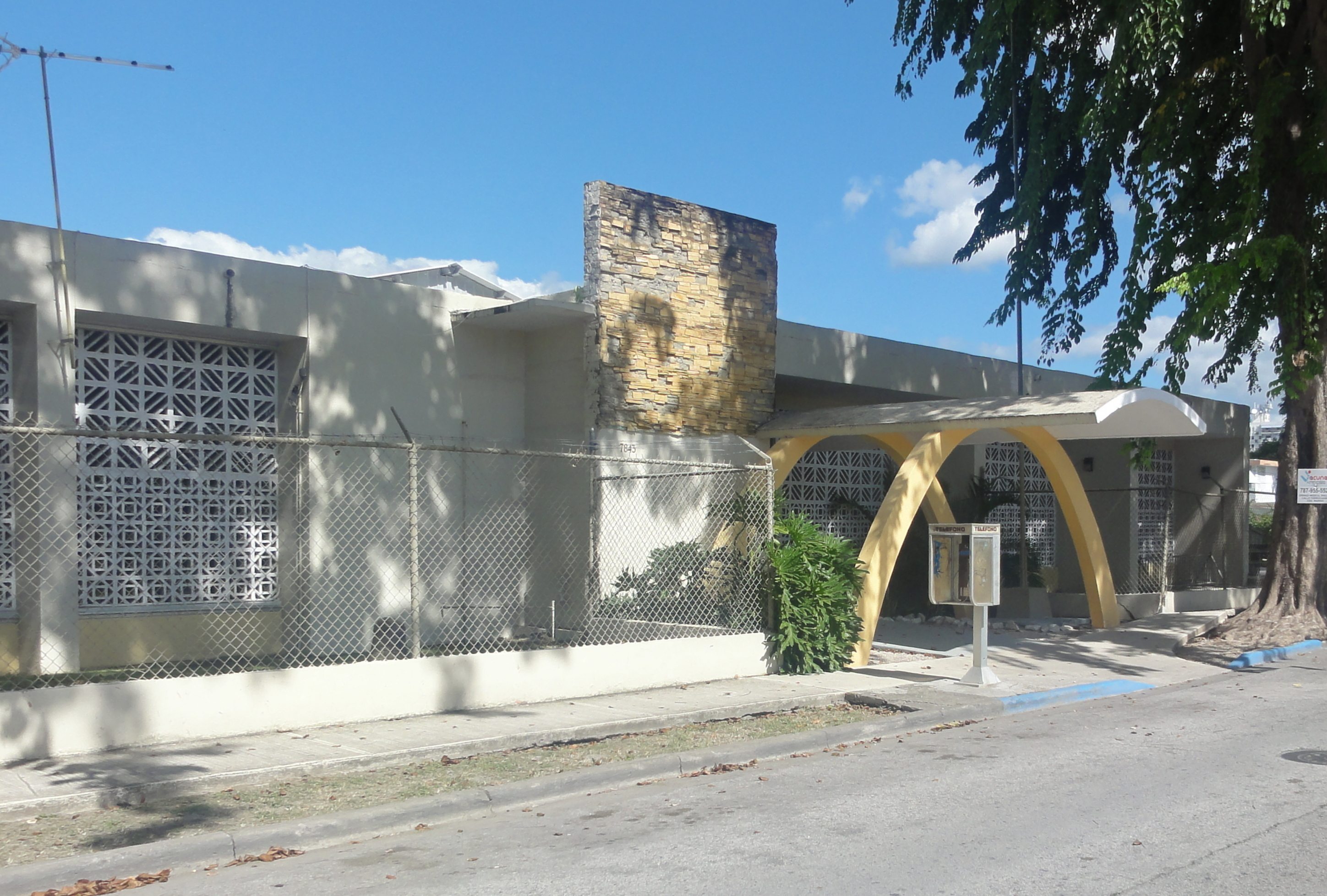
Ponce YMCA (1955)

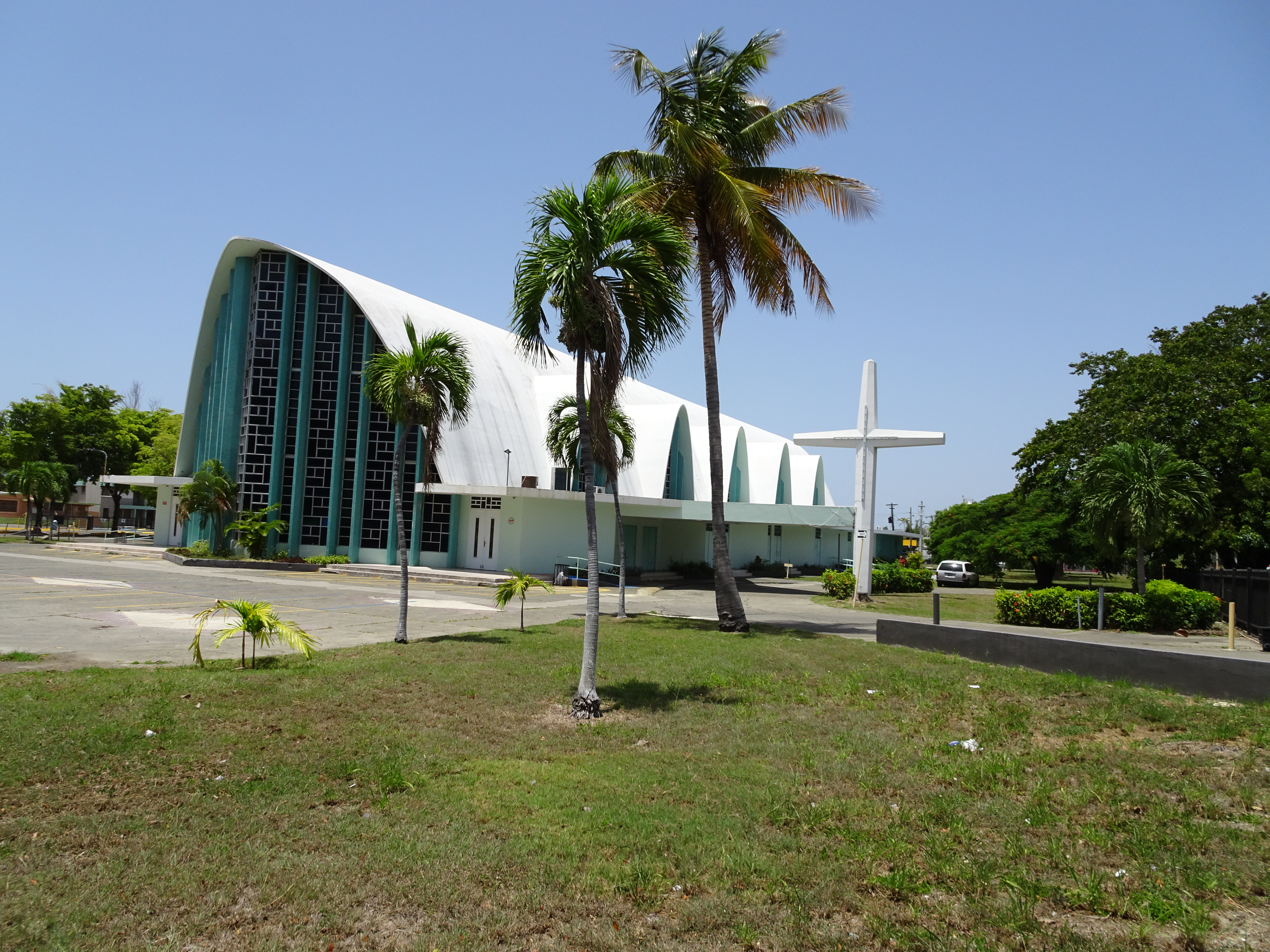
Santa María Reina Church (1957) in Ponce

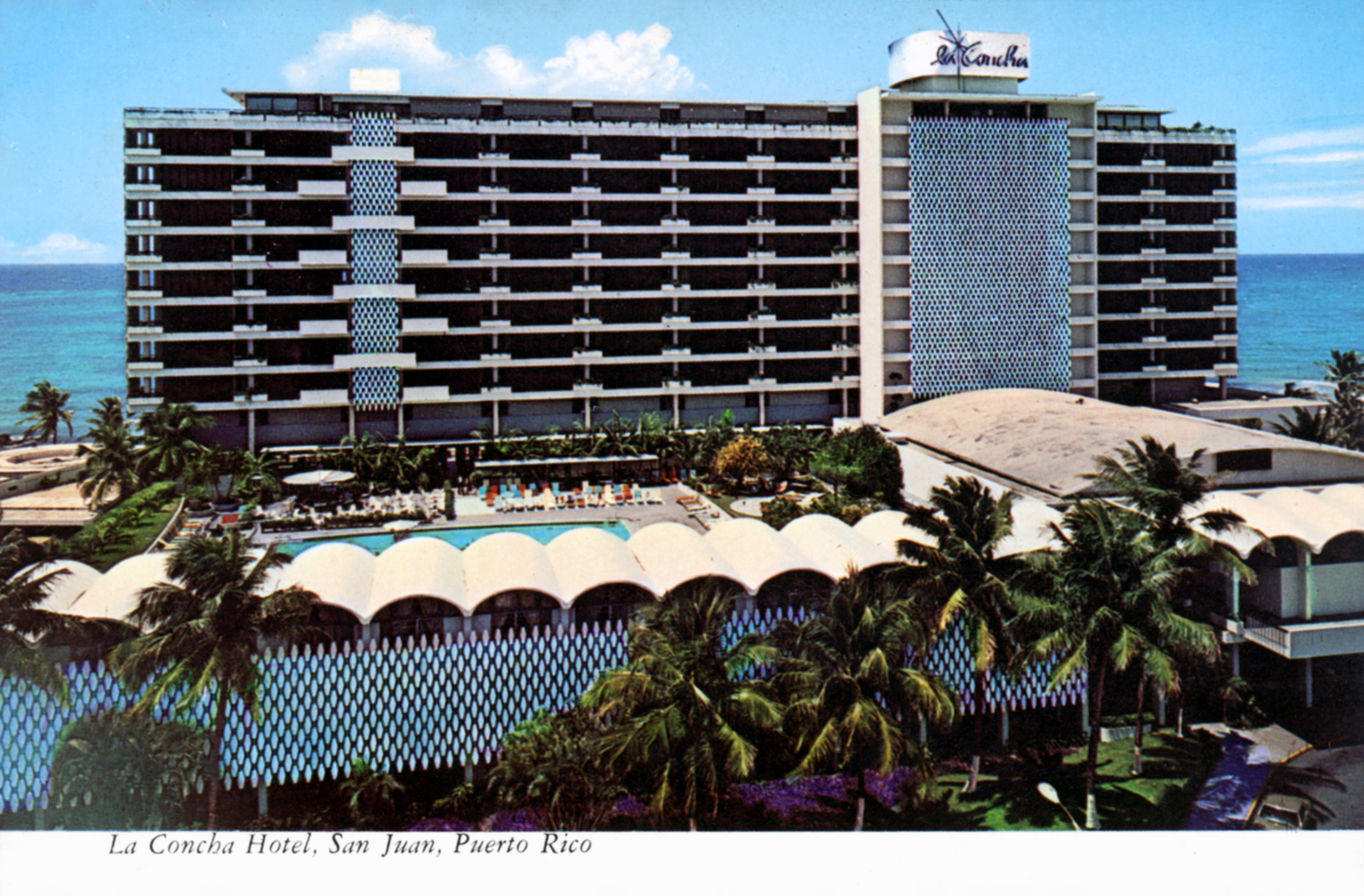
La Concha Hotel (1958) in Condado

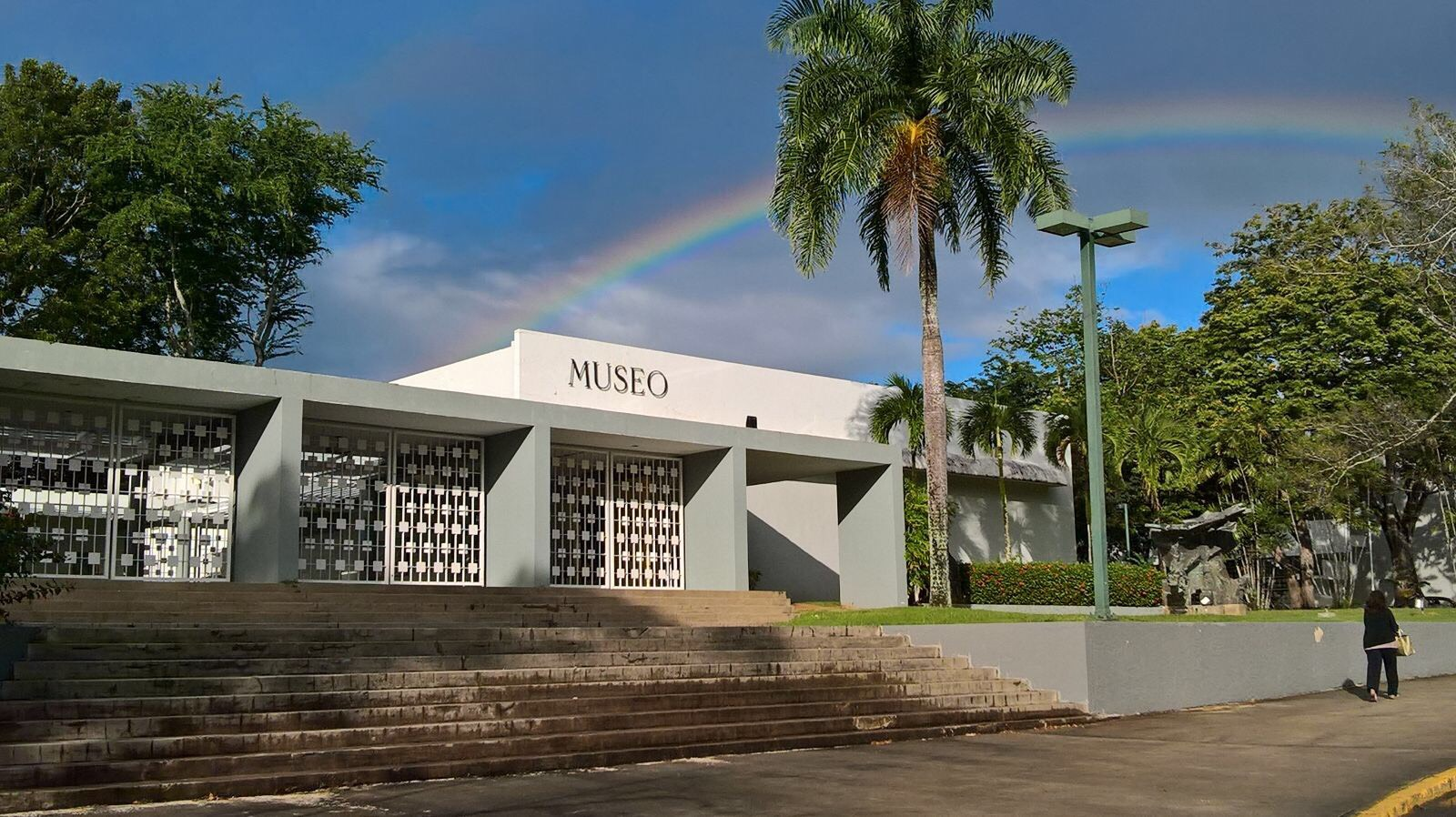
Museum of the University of Puerto Rico (1959) in Río Piedras

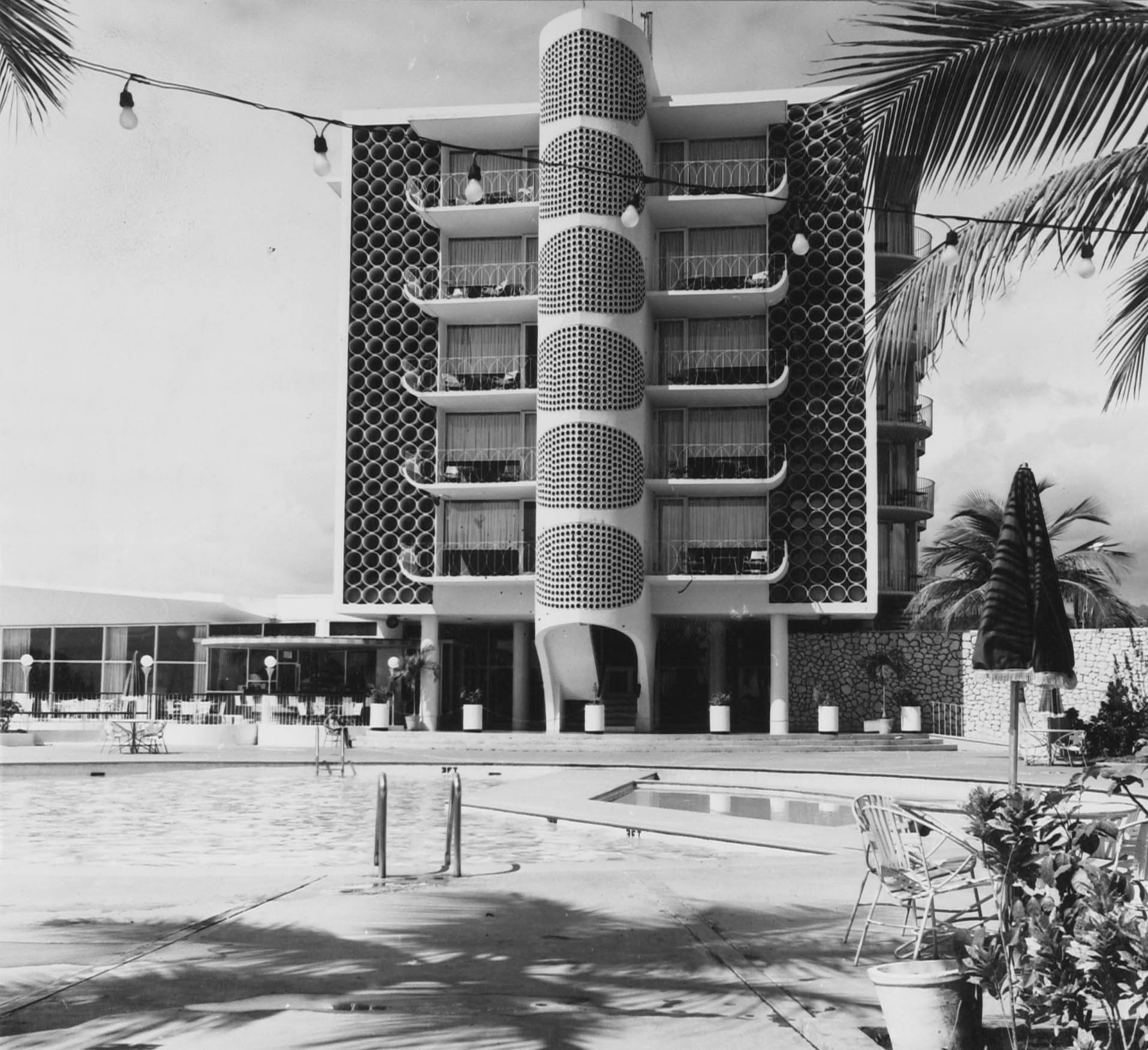
Hotel Ponce Intercontinental (1960)

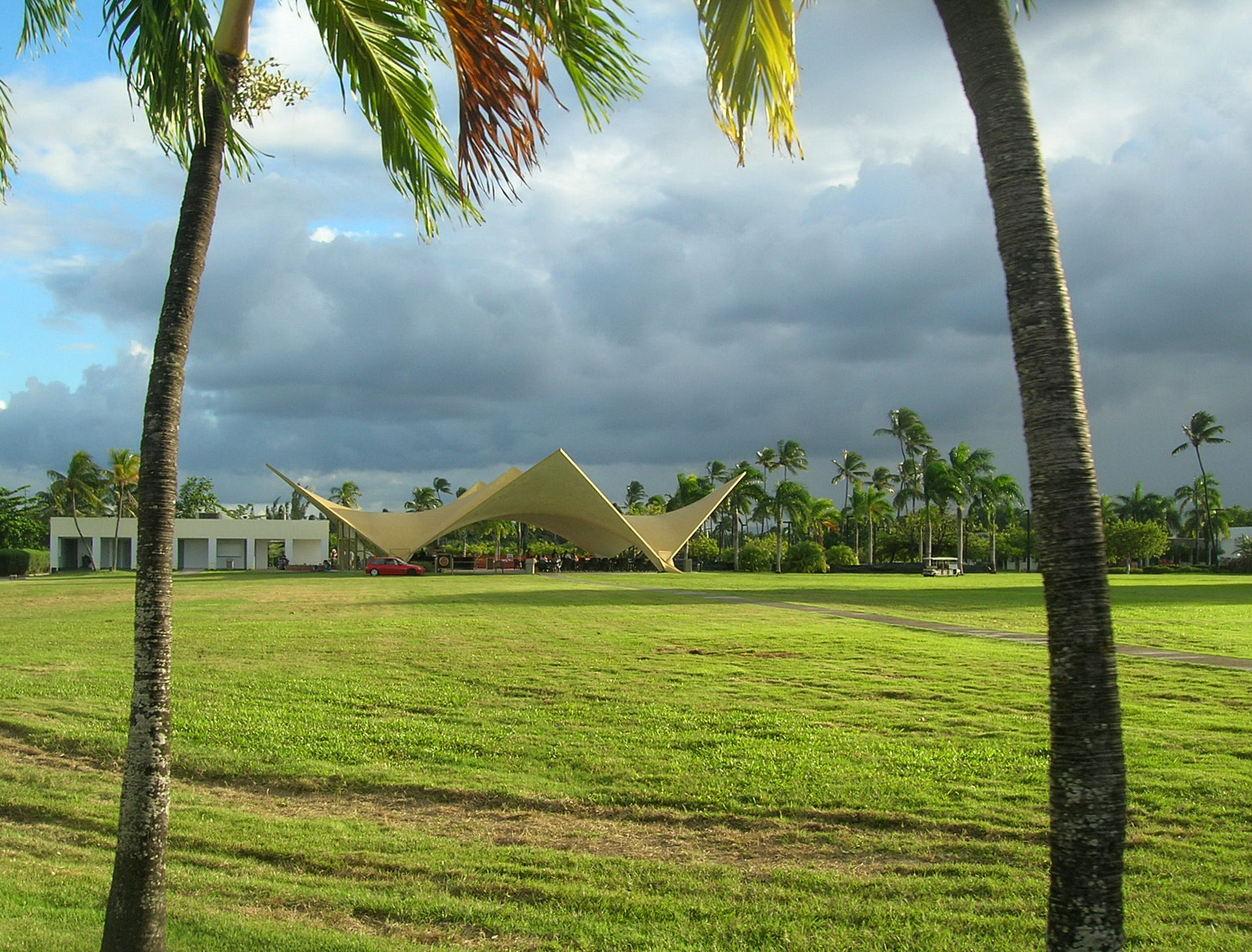
Bacardi Pavilion (1960) in Cataño

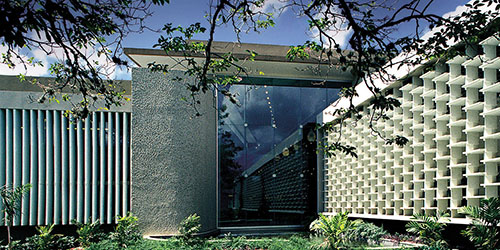
University of Puerto Rico School of Law (1961) in Río Piedras

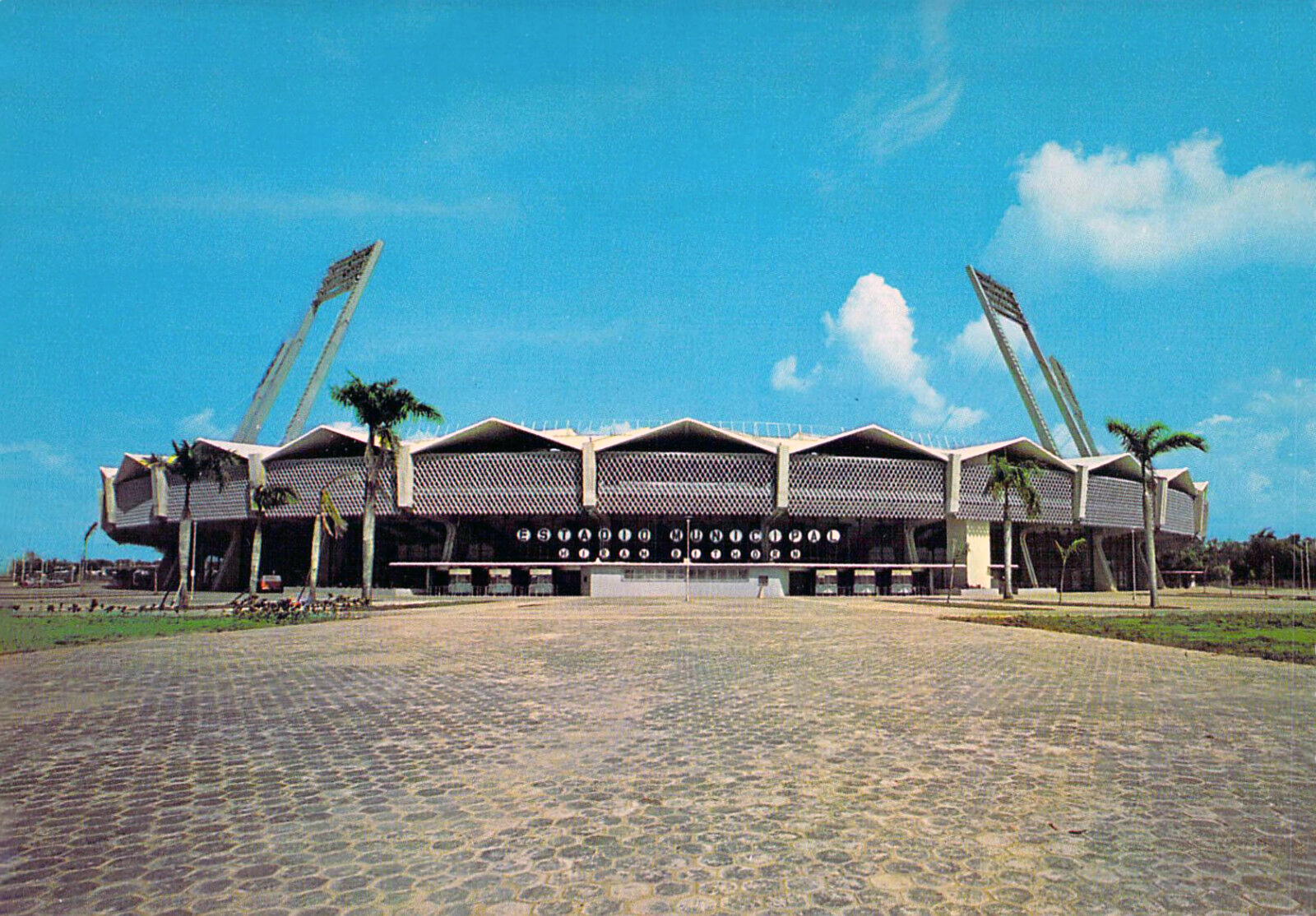
Hiram Bithorn Stadium (1962) in Hato Rey

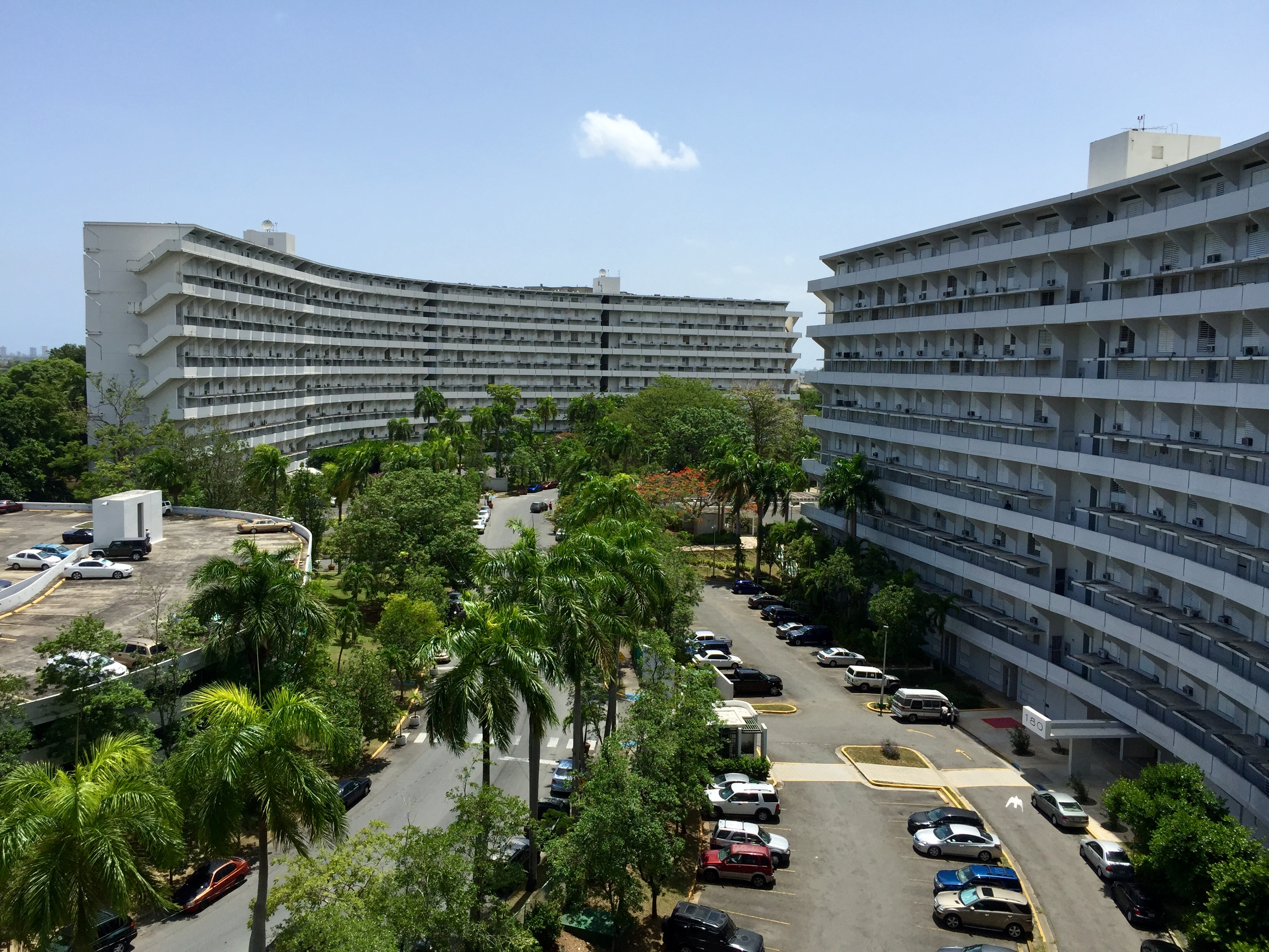
El Monte condominium complex (1964) in Hato Rey

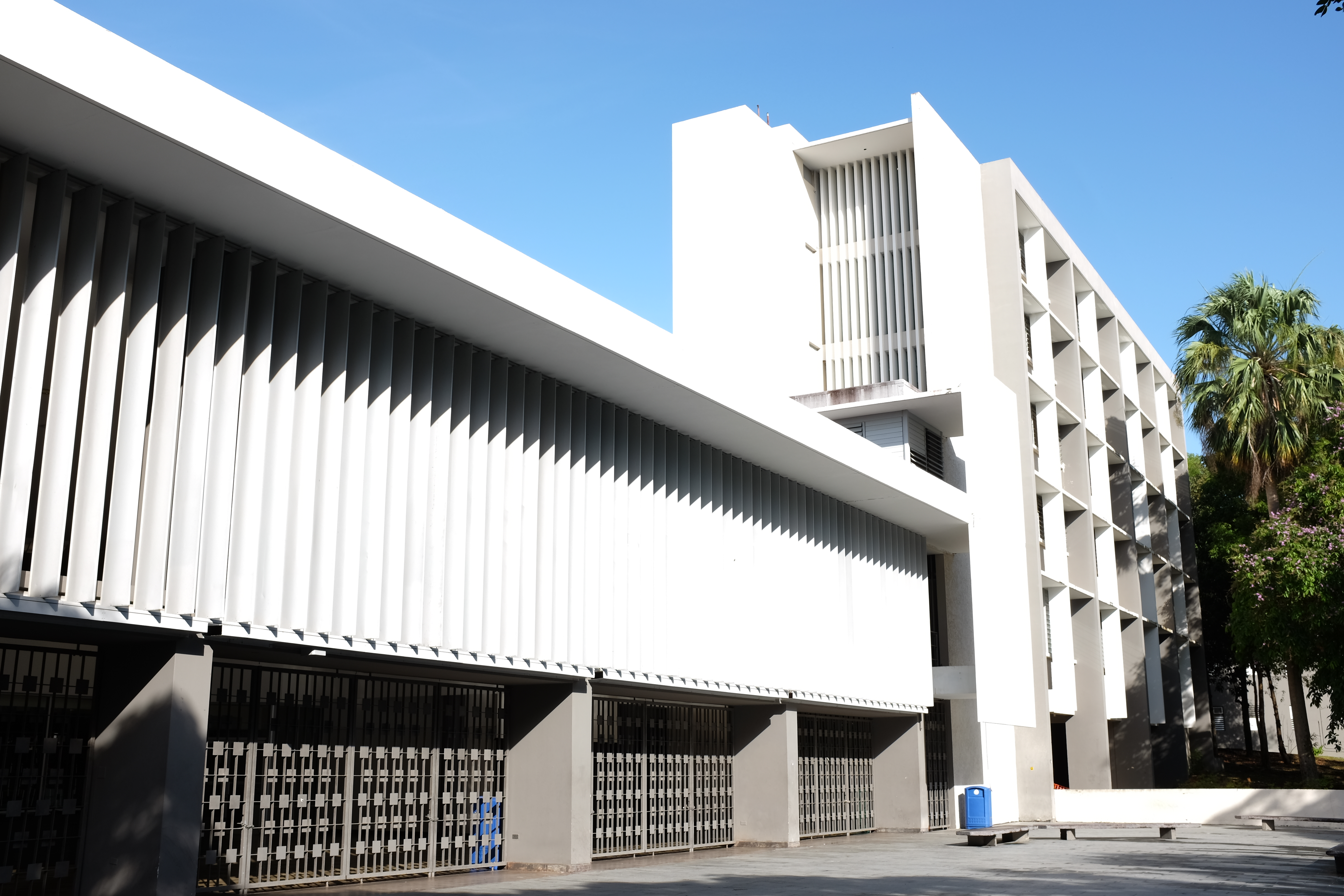
University of Puerto Rico Student Center (1966) in Río Piedras

The dominance of the International Styles of architecture in Puerto Rico began to wane during the late 1960s and throughout the 1970s, coinciding with the peak demographic development of the island which created less uniform and more expressive and context-sensitive styles of design that gave way to a transitional period of "early Late Modernism: that was widely adapted into the local vernacular architectural language. Everyday architecture in Puerto Rico reinterpreted the modern ideals with local materials, artisanal finishes and cultural-responsive details. These vernacular aesthetics were soon adapted to new yet nostalgic styles of design applied to smaller-scale commercial developments, municipal government buildings, churches, apartments and condominiums, hospitals, and even single-family residences. Houses and apartment blocks incorporated brise-soleil, concrete screens (quiebrasoles), terrazzo floors and jalousie windows, blending the sleek lines of modernism with practical and accessible solutions for the rapidly growing Puerto Rican middle class.

Vernacular Modernism

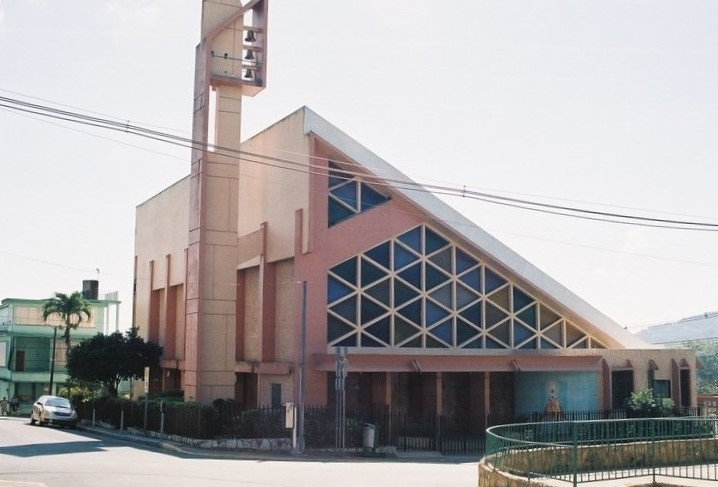
Tres Santos Reyes Church (1960) in Aguas Buenas

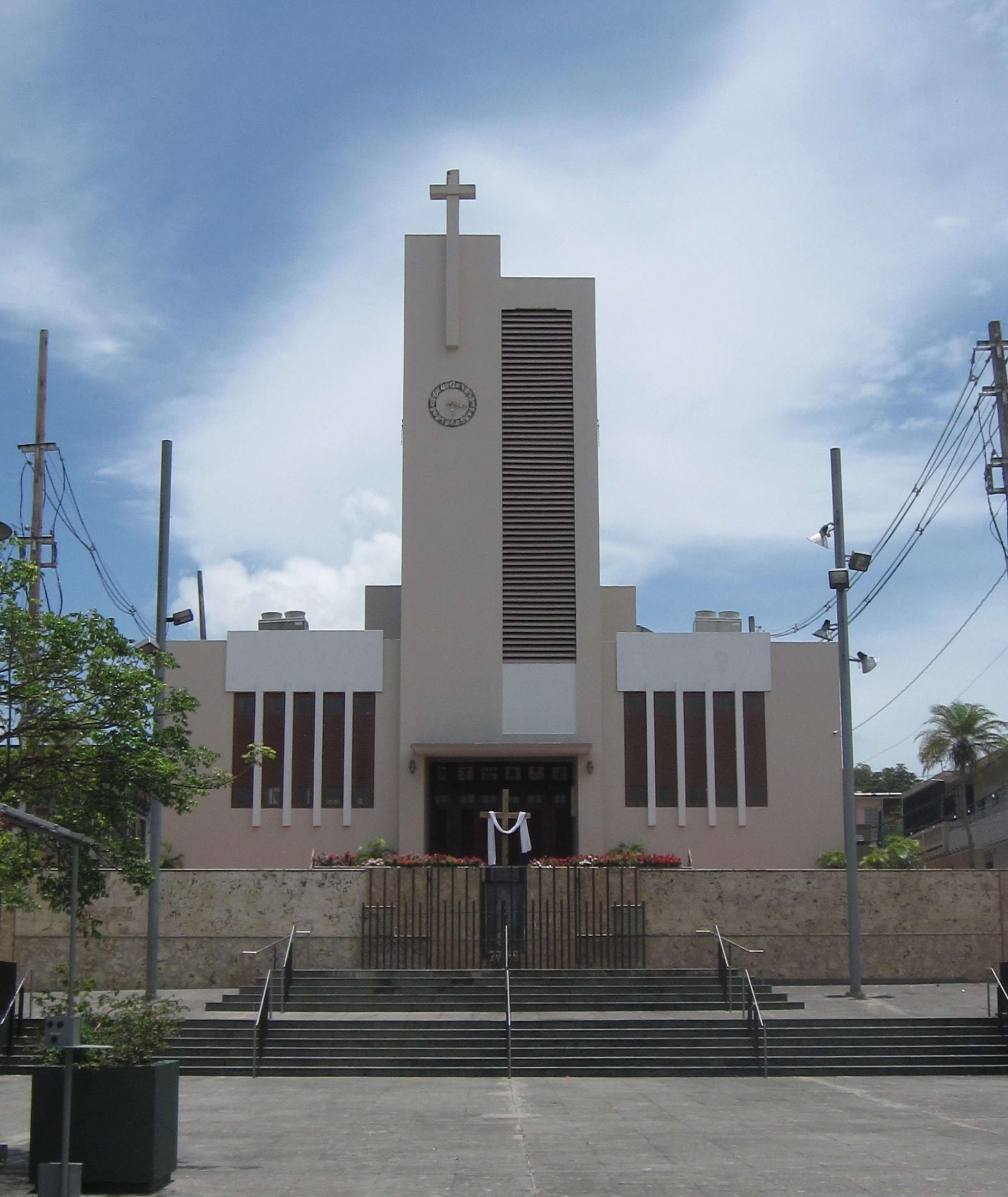
Nuestra Señora del Carmen Church (1961) in Morovis

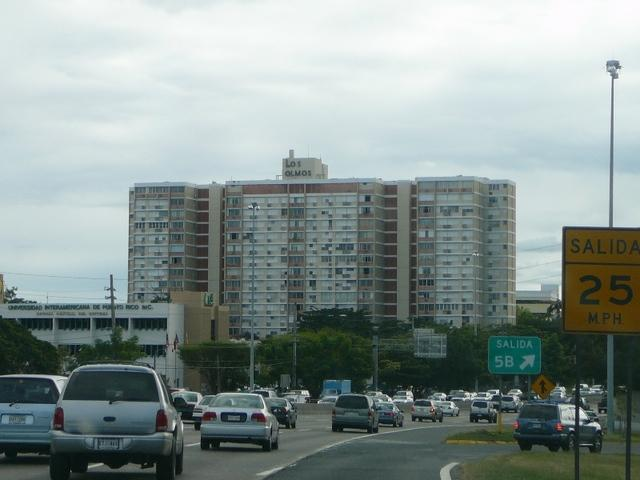
Los Olmos condominium (1971) in Hato Rey

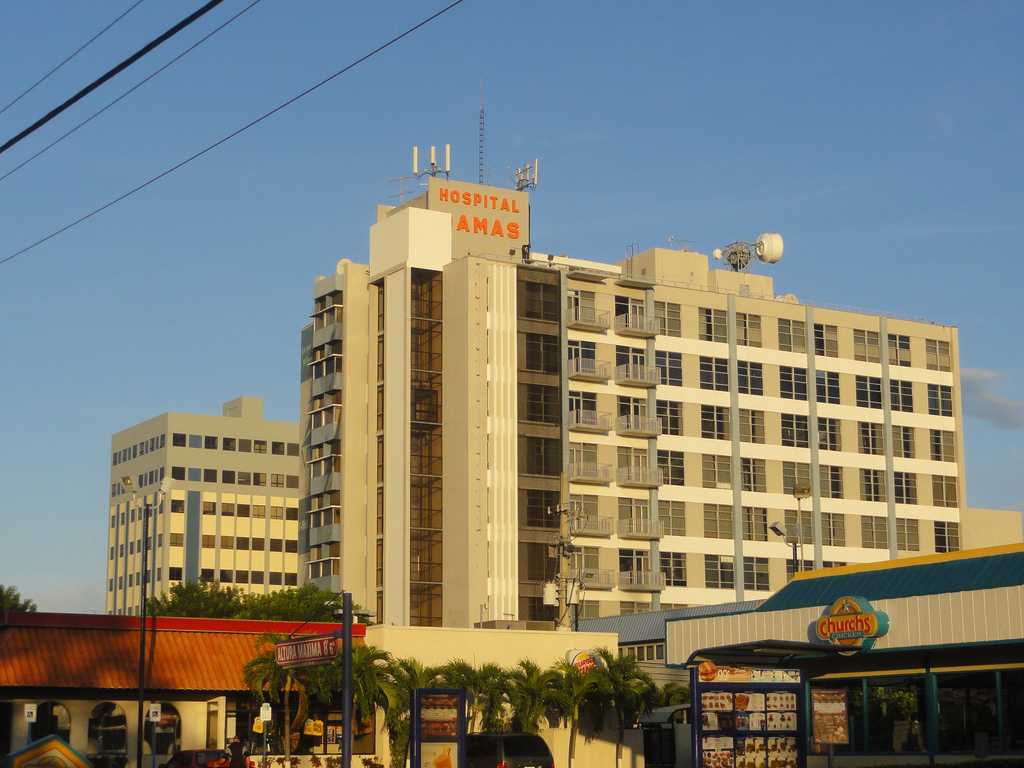
Hospital Damas (1973) in Ponce

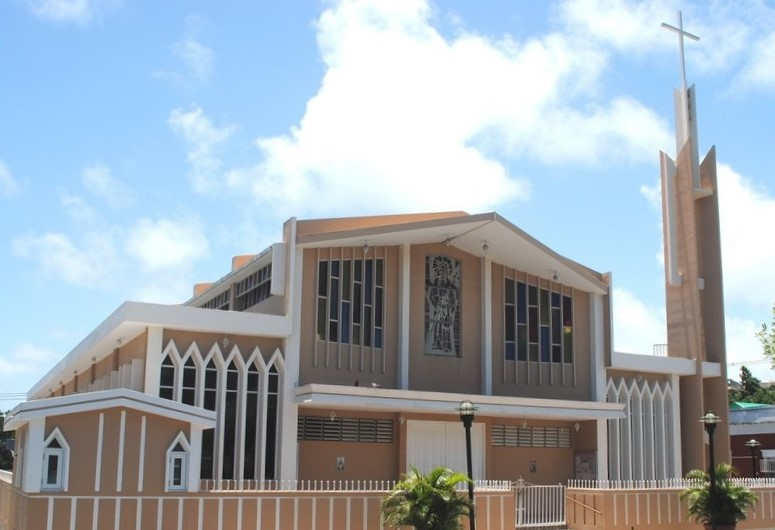
San José Church (1974) in Camuy

=== Late Modernism ===
Puerto Rican architecture transitioned to the more expressive and technological oriented aesthetics of Late Modernism in the late 1960s and early 1970s. The trends at the time emphasized bold structural expression, monumentality and the visibility of construction and engineering systems with the use of concrete and steel. In Puerto Rico, these trends coincided with mass development projects of the 1970s, a time when the island was experiencing its largest demographic and financial development of the 20th century, reflecting the territorial ambition for modernization, and national and international visibility. International events, such as the 1979 Pan American Games hosted in San Juan, sparked the construction of large-scale arenas and event venues, such as the Roberto Clemente Coliseum. Just like Hato Rey hosted the development of large scale sporting event and tertiary sector projects, Santurce became the home of large cultural and administrative venues such as the Luis A. Ferré Performing Arts Center and the Minillas Government Center, respectively. Meanwhile, the economic boom was also reflected in the construction of commercial and private residential projects that became living workshops for the development and expansion of Puerto Rican architectural identities.

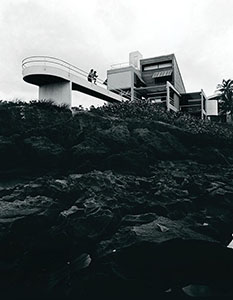
House at Breñas Point (1978) in Dorado

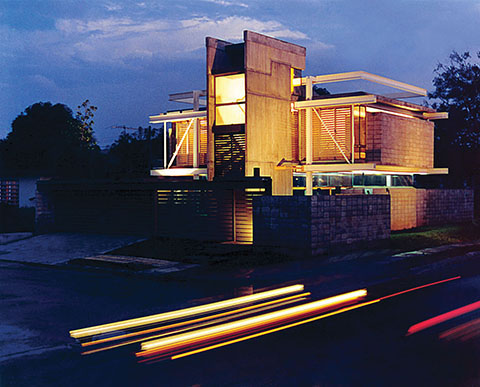
Casa de Acero (1980) in Río Piedras

==== Brutalism ====
Brutalism in Puerto Rico overlaps with the Late Modern developments of the 1970s. Many government and institutional projects of the time adopted the raw concrete monumentality of Brutalism, often even adding other Late Modern elements of structural boldness and expressive geometry to create a Brutalist Puerto Rican identity. This blending of approaches reflected both global and local shifts in aesthetic taste and search for an architectural identity. Despite its austere reputation, Brutalism has proved enduring in Puerto Rico, with many of its principles even echoing into the 21st century, and further influencing postmodern and contemporary architecture in the island.

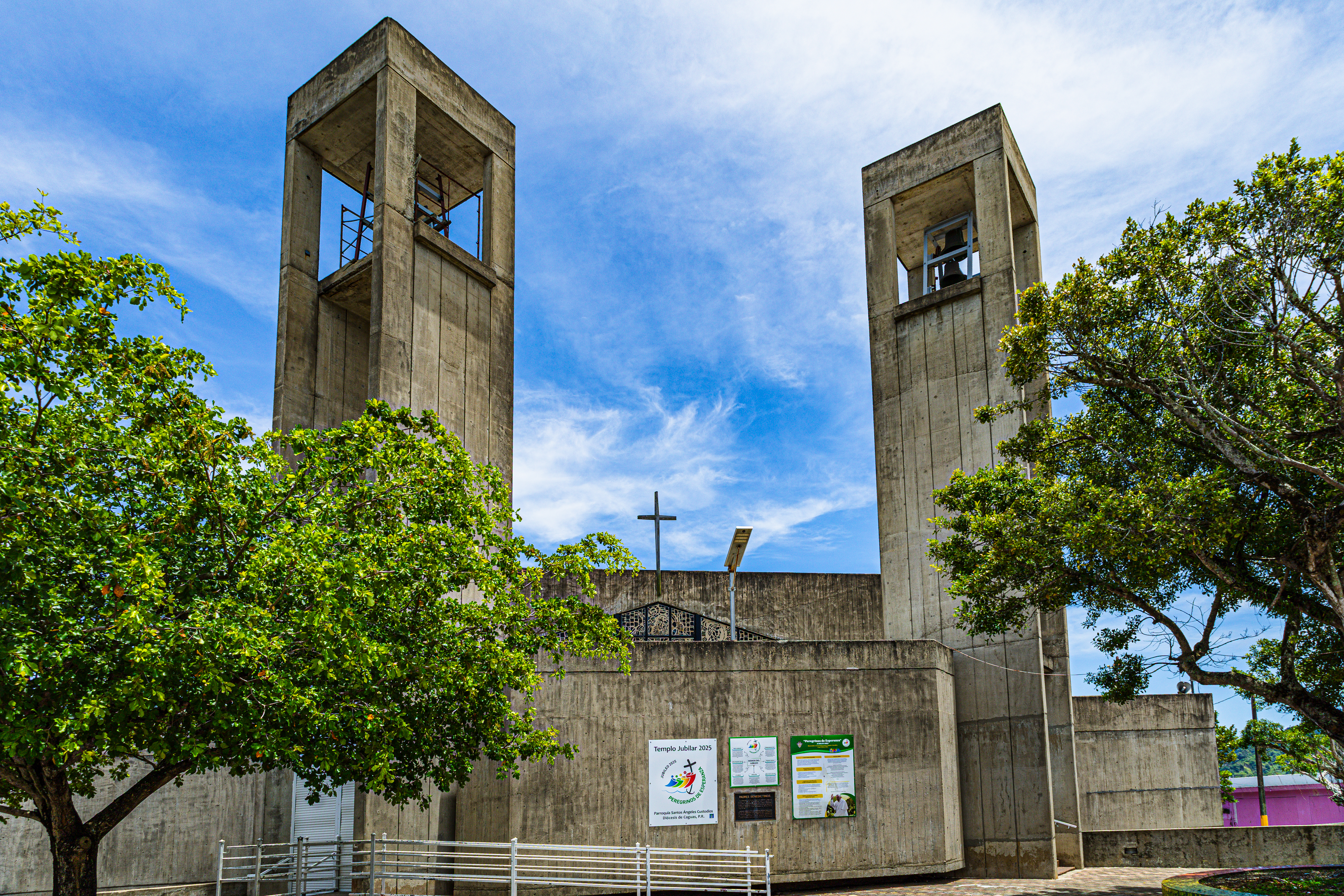
Santos Ángeles Custodios Church (1968) in Yabucoa

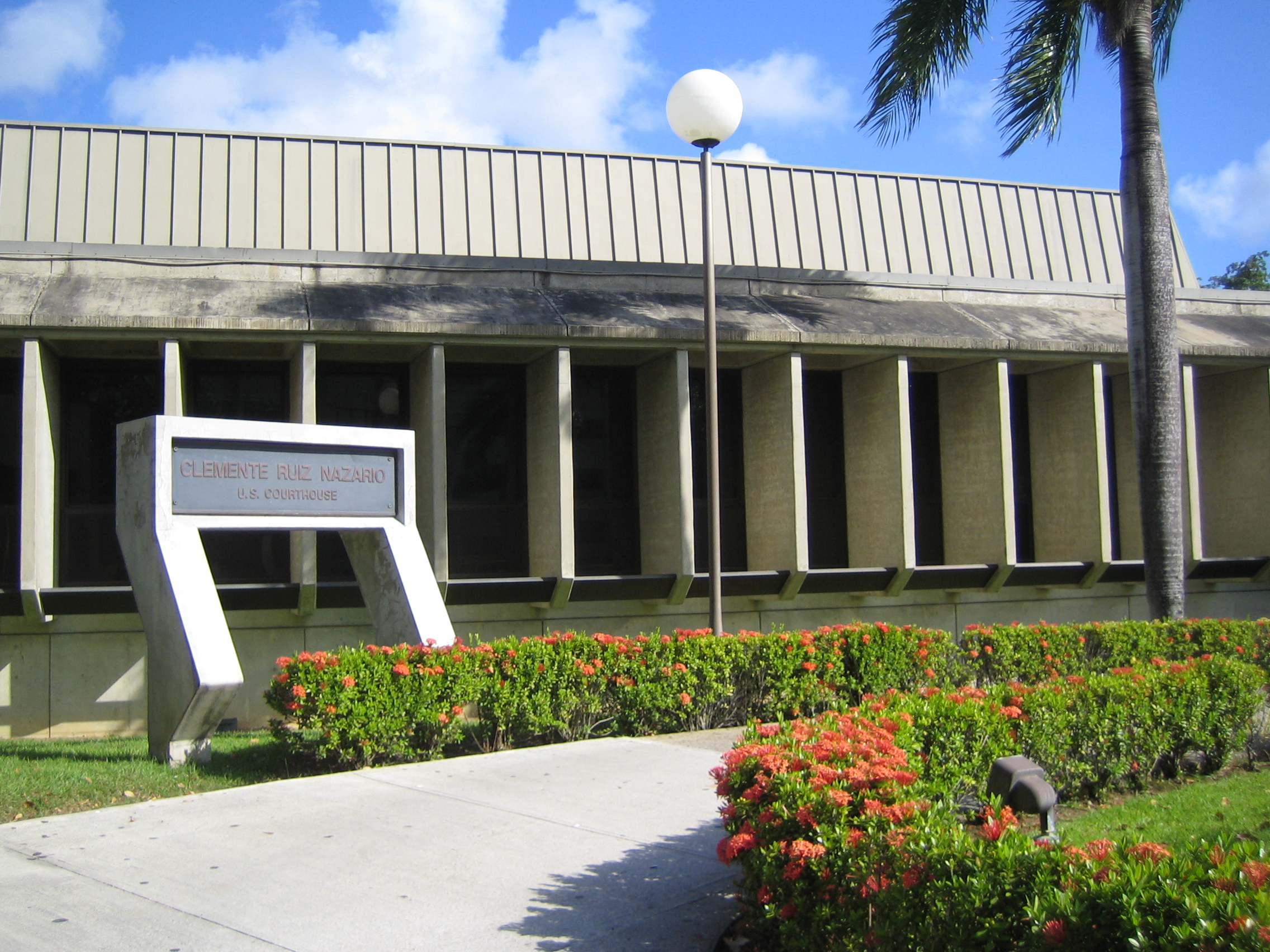
Clemente Ruiz-Nazario United States Courthouse (1970s) in Hato Rey

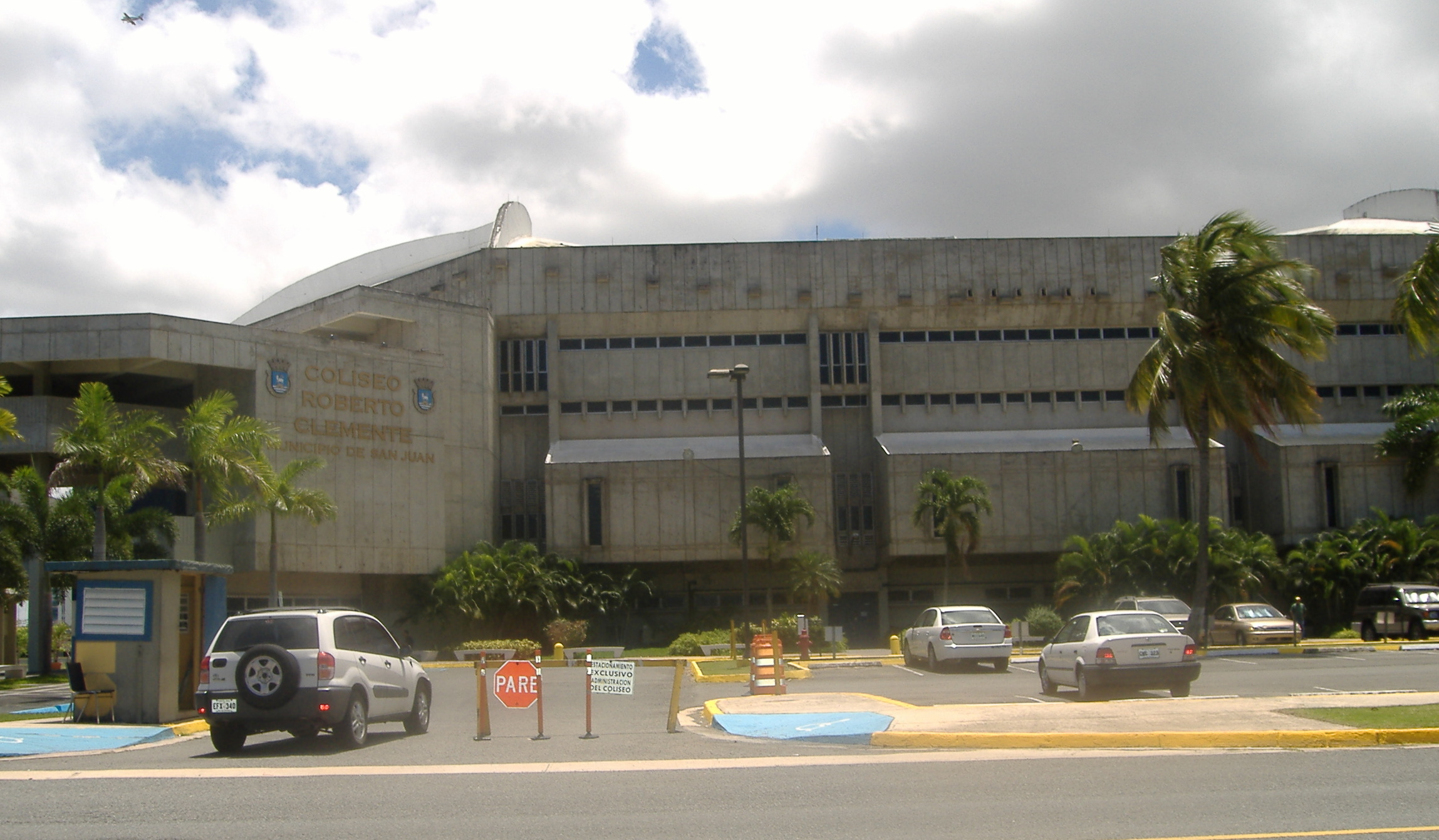
Roberto Clemente Coliseum (1973) in Hato Rey

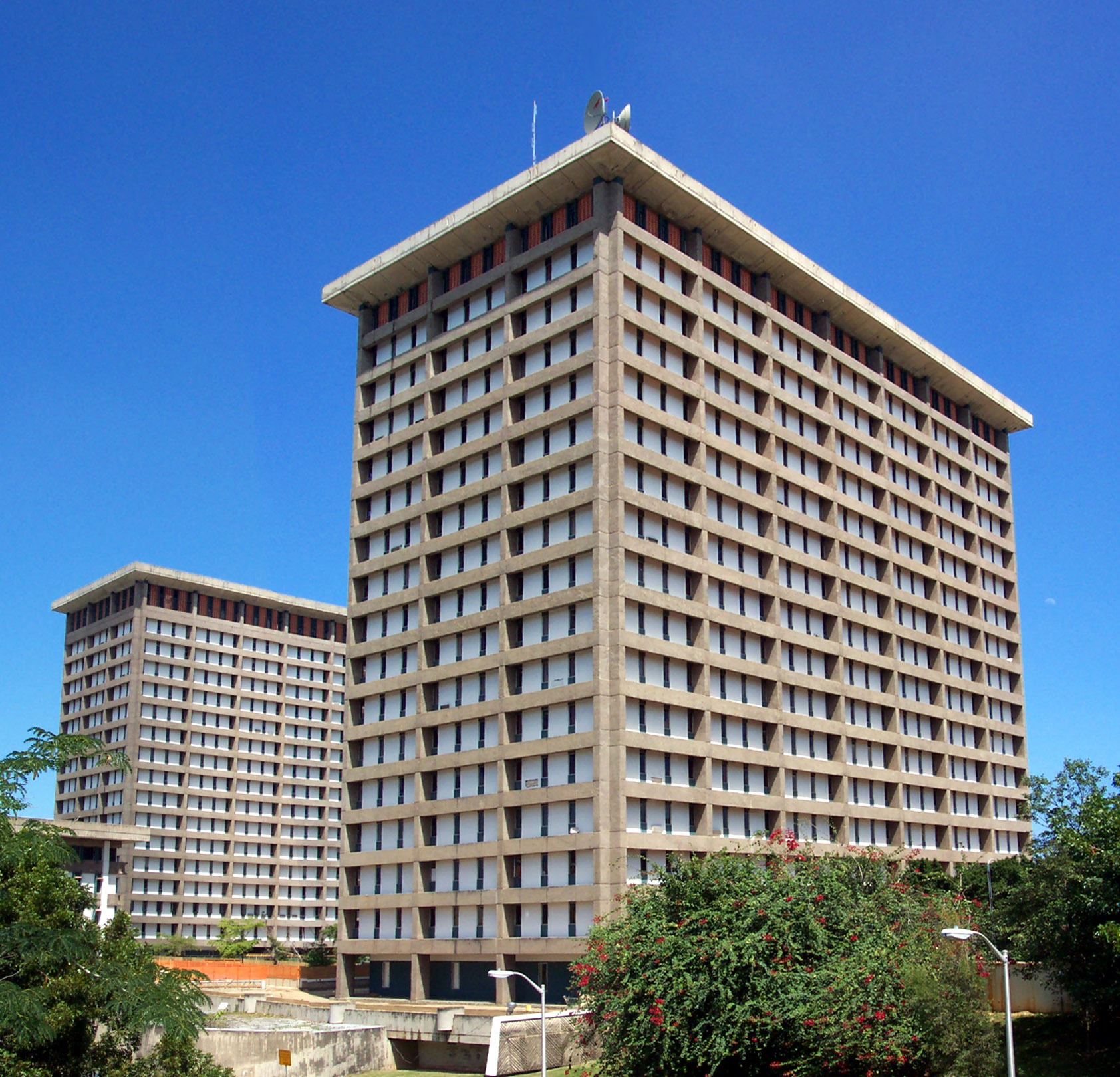
Minillas Government Center (1975) in Santurce

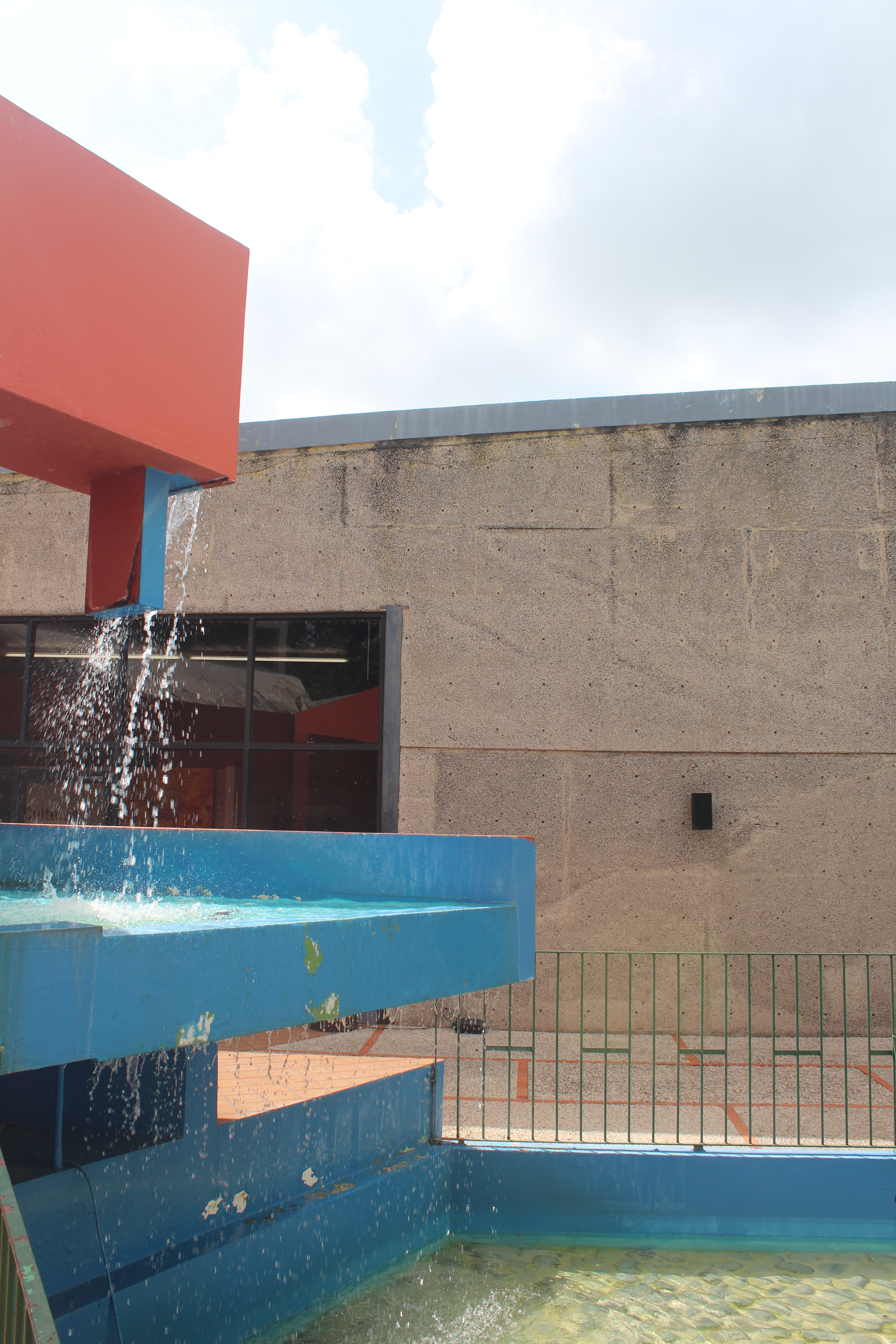
Tibes Indigenous Ceremonial Center museum (1982) in Ponce

==== New Formalism ====
Similar to Brutalism, New Formalism left its mark in Puerto Rican architecture in the 1960s and 1970s, in alignment with the wave of monumental civic and cultural projects. Characterized by the blends of modern structural techniques with classical order and symmetry, the New Formalist style in Puerto Rico often appeared in museums, cultural event venues and government agency headquarters due to its ceremonial qualities. In other examples, such as in the Luis A. Ferré Performing Arts Center, elements that characterize New Formalism would often be mixed with those of Brutalism in order to project scale and monumentality. Consequently, universities and larger scale state and municipal civic projects of the 1980s and beyond in Puerto Rico would incorporate elements of both Brutalism and New Formalism for this same reason.

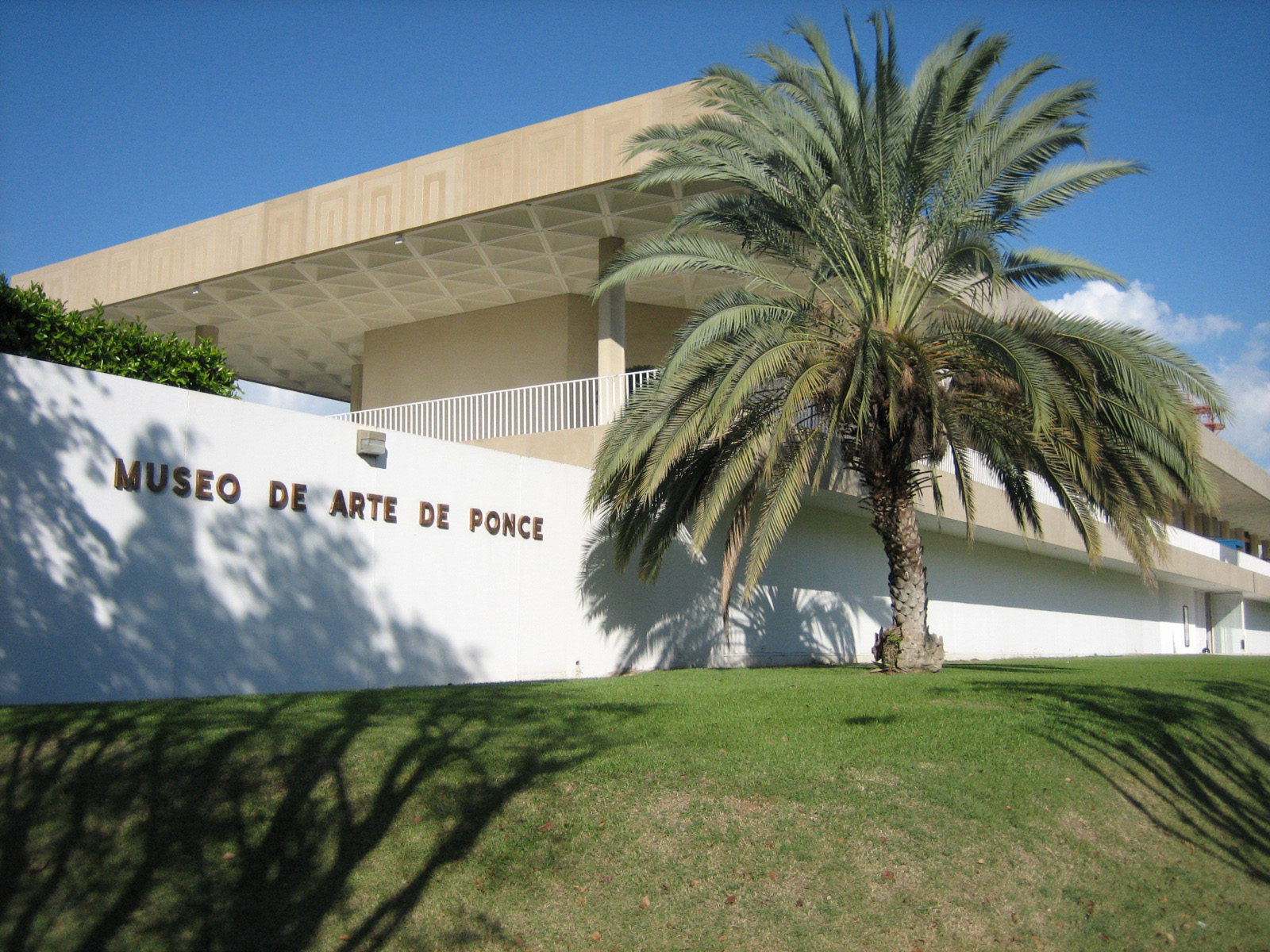
Museo de Arte de Ponce (1965)

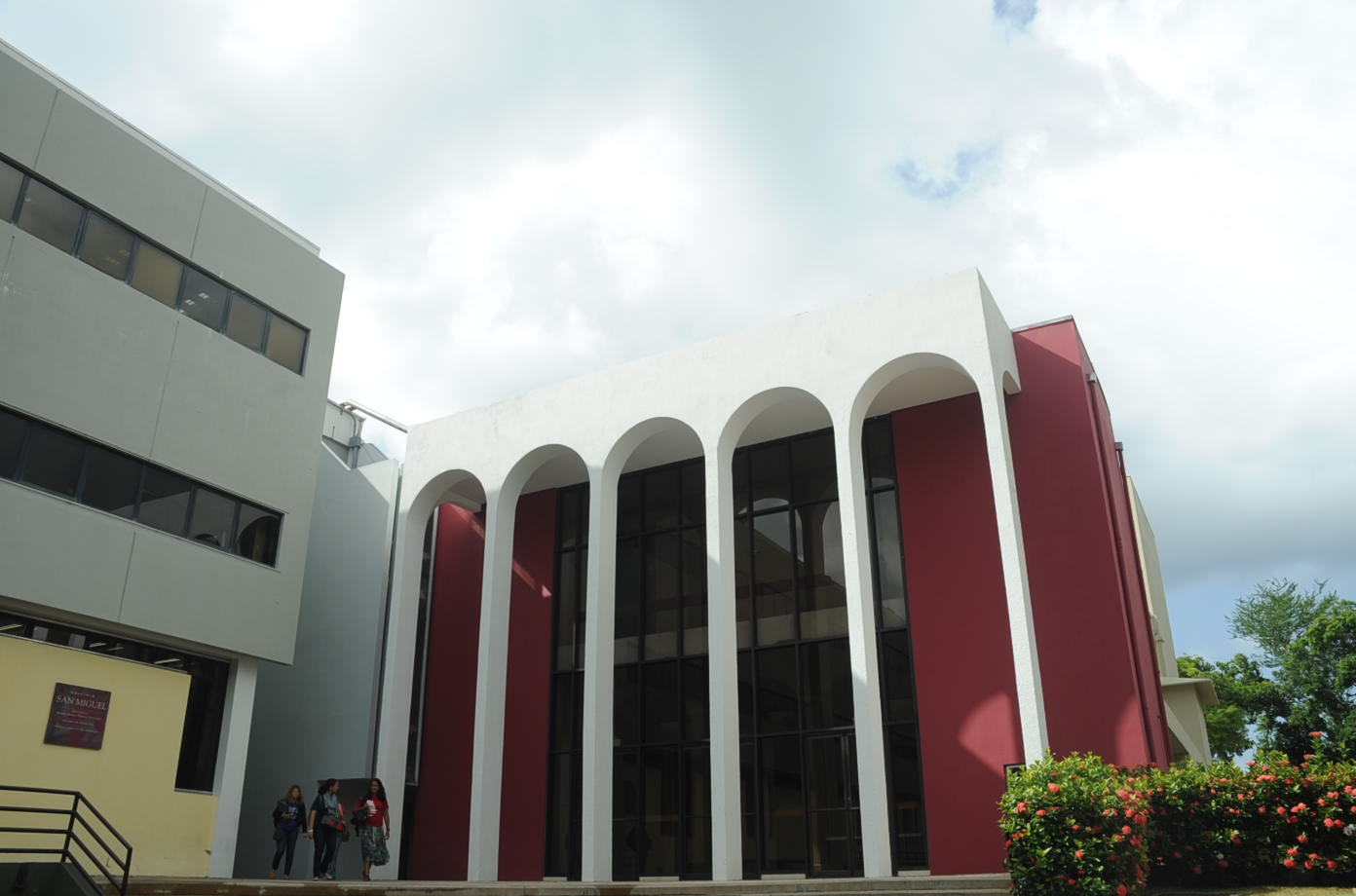
Emilio S. Belaval Theater (1979) in Santurce

==== Structural expressionism ====
The last decades of the 20th century saw the rise of structural expressionism in Puerto Rico. The primary aesthetics of this trend consists of explicit showcase of its structures, spans, and building and technological systems. Brutalist and New Formalist elements of the previous decades also influenced the local structural expressionist movement, particularly in the celebration of the raw honesty of concrete and the ceremonial use of lines and symmetry, respectively. This blend of Brutalist and Late Modern characteristics can be seen in government buildings of the time, such as the Casa Alcaldía de Bayamón, built in the 1980s. By the 1990s, these elements evolved into expressions of high-tech and organic architecture, where lightness, transparency and biomorphic forms reshaped many of the public landmarks of the time. The Puerto Rico Convention Center, inaugurated in 2005, is a prime example of the "tropical high-tech expression" developed in the island. Similarly, the José Miguel Agrelot Coliseum (Choliseo) relies on vast roof spans and exposed structural frames that playfully merge function and decoration.

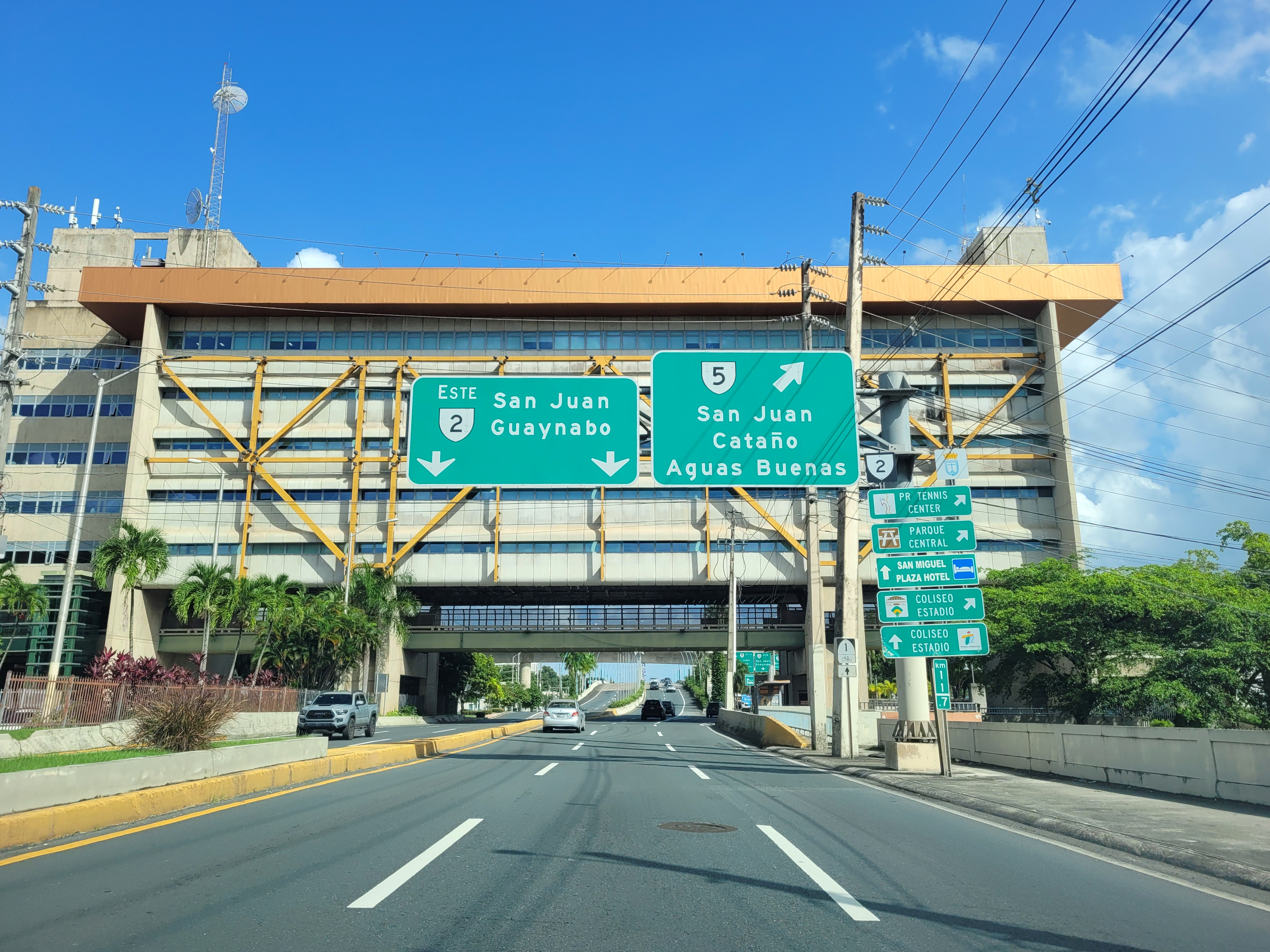
Casa Alcaldía de Bayamón (1980)

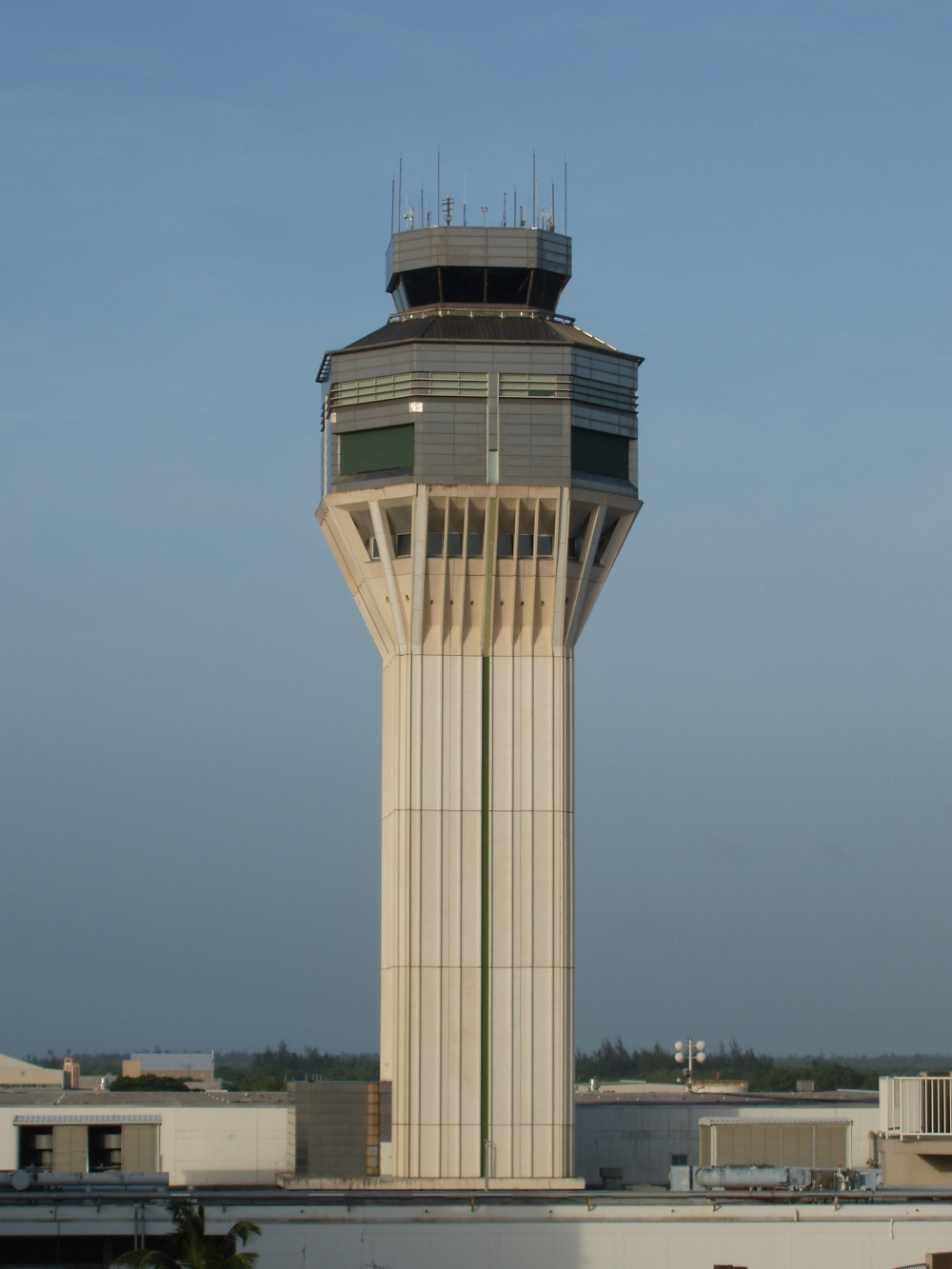
SJU control tower (1990) in Carolina

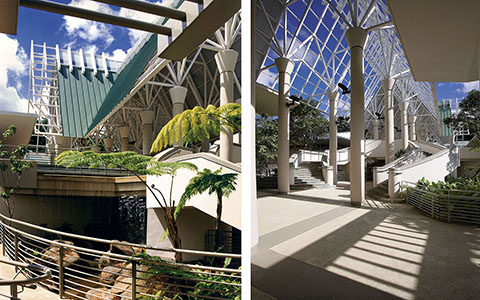
El Portal Rainforest Center (1996) in El Yunque

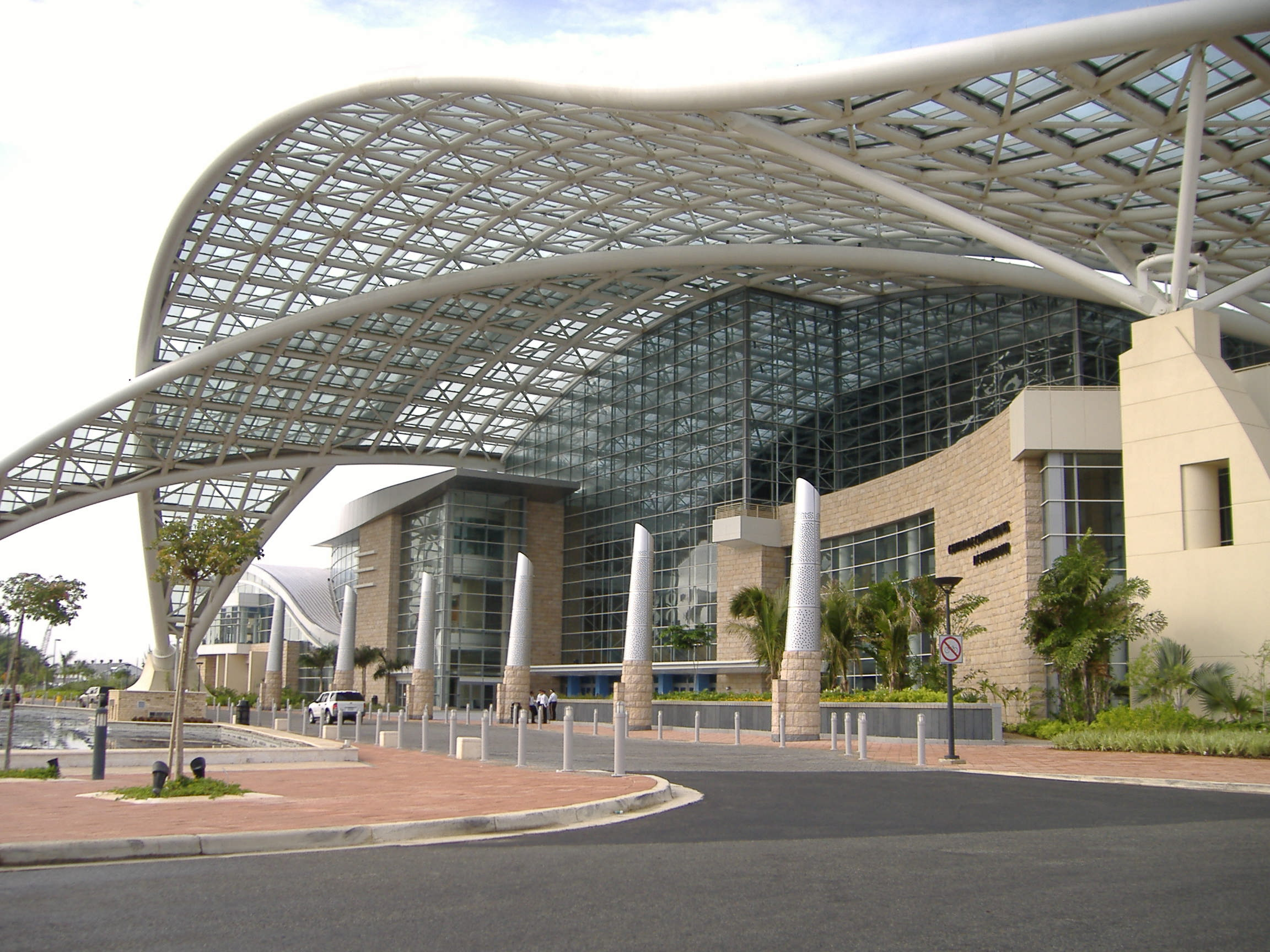
Puerto Rico Convention Center (2000)

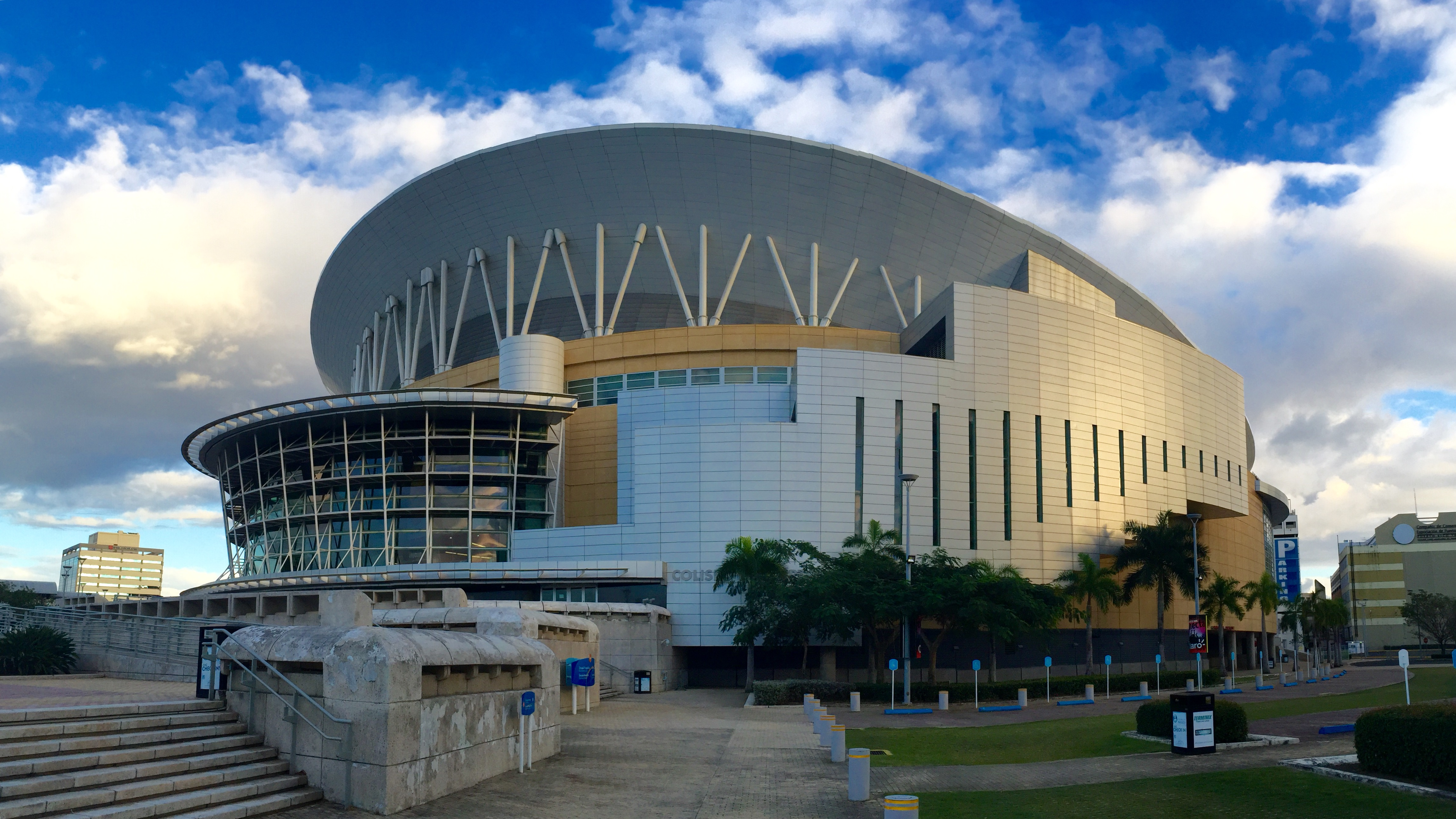
El Choliseo (2004) in Hato Rey

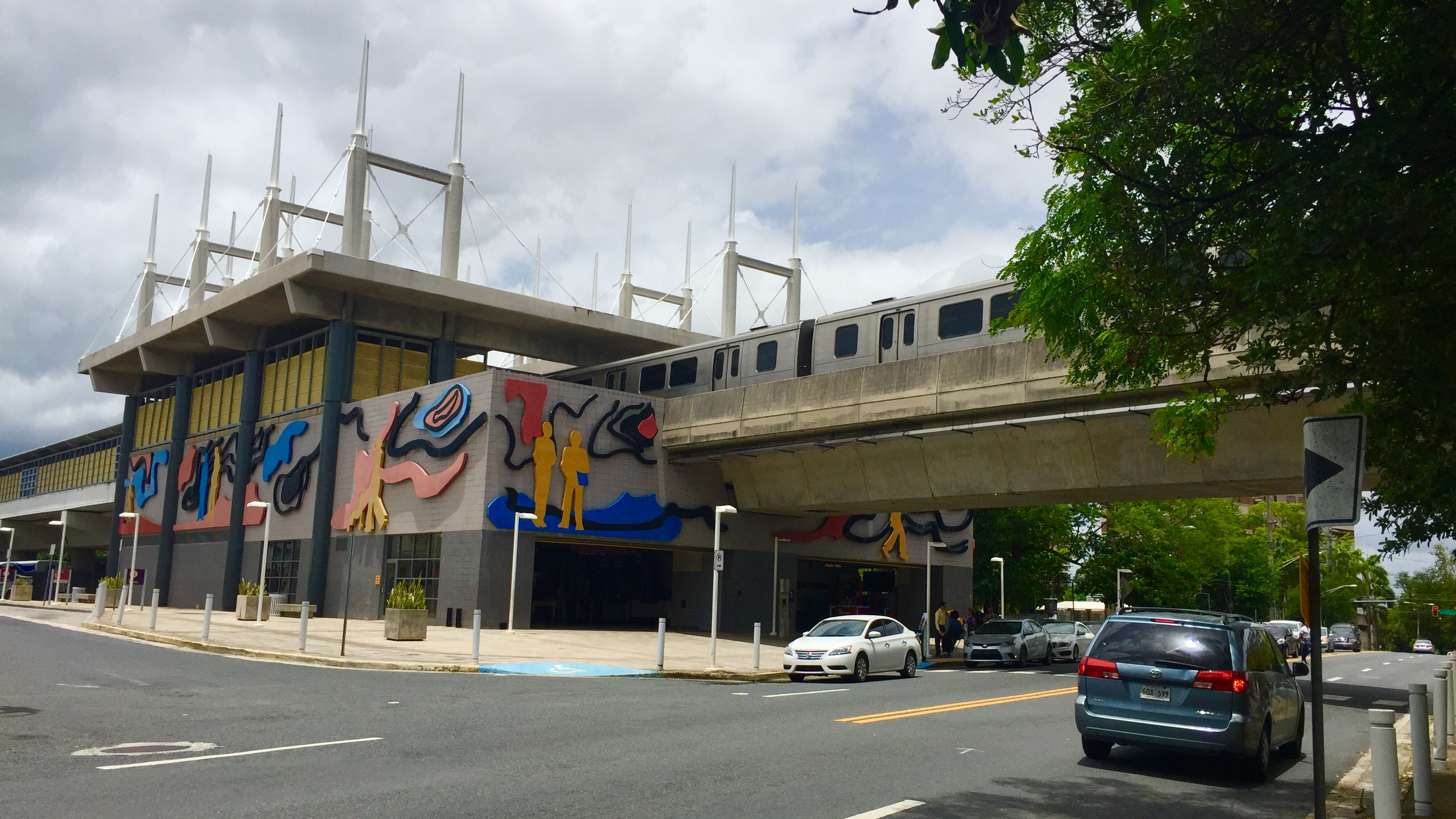
Piñero station of the Tren Urbano system (2004) in Hato Rey

== Postmodernism ==
Although elements of postmodernism began to appear in Puerto Rican architecture in the 1980s and 1990s, the first fully postmodern projects in full separation from the austerity of modernism can be seen in the 2000s. As the structural expressionist construction projects in Puerto Rico adopted Late Modern elements, postmodern architecture in Puerto Rico incorporates elements of structural expressionism. Puerto Rican postmodern architecture, however, also revives elements of Revivalism from the previous century which had been previously put aside during the era of Modernism. Residential and commercial projects in the 1990s and 2000s also adopted postmodern elements, using varied rooflines, ornamental balconies and eclectic mixtures of styles beyond the perceived rigidity of the mid-20th century. By the mid-2000s, Puerto Rico's postmodernism had already begun to merge with structural expressionism and contemporary trends, but leaving behind an architectural landscape of hybrid-style buildings that embody both playful experimentation and sociocultural symbolism.

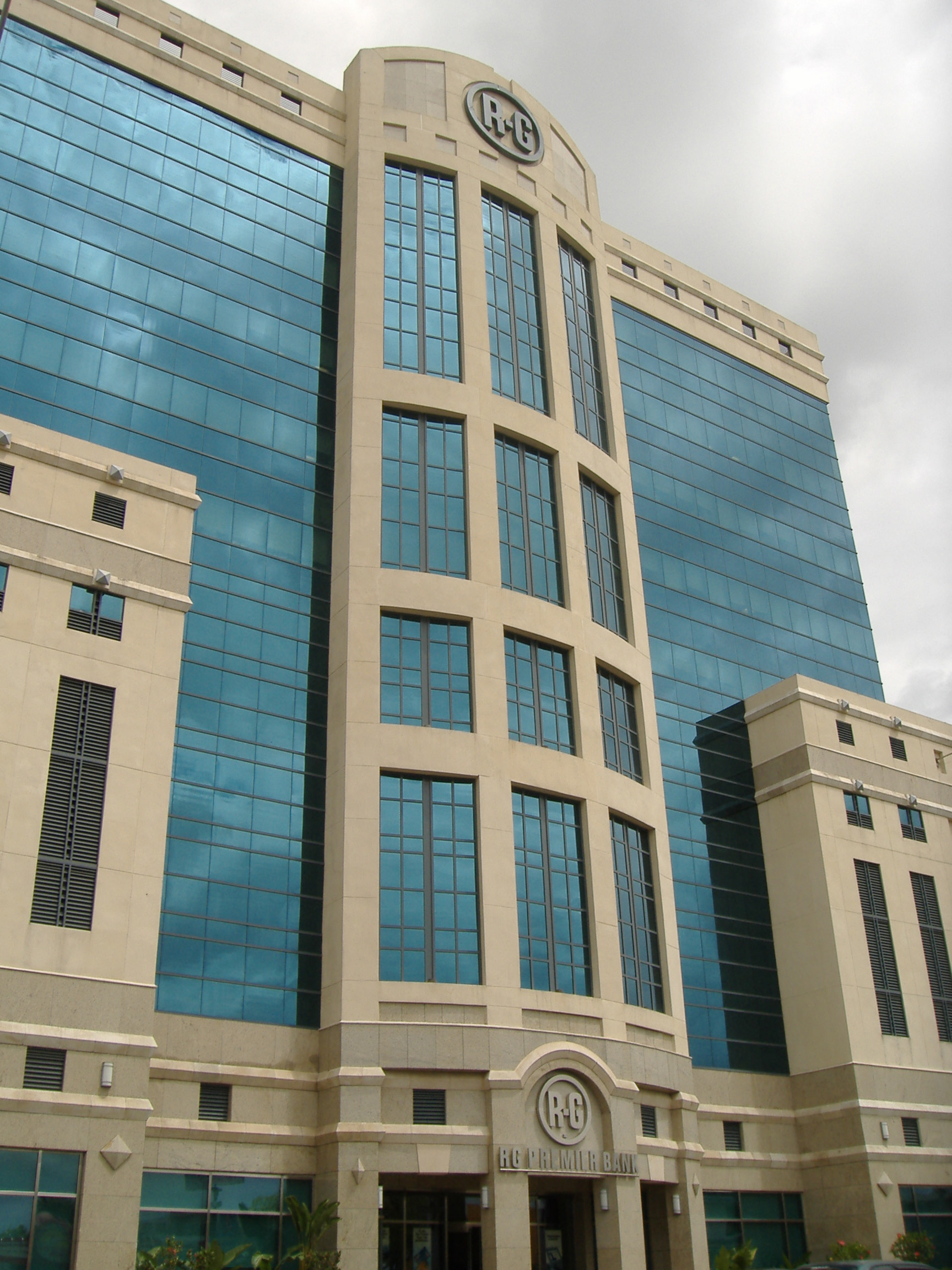
Former headquarters of R&G Premier Bank (2002) in Hato Rey

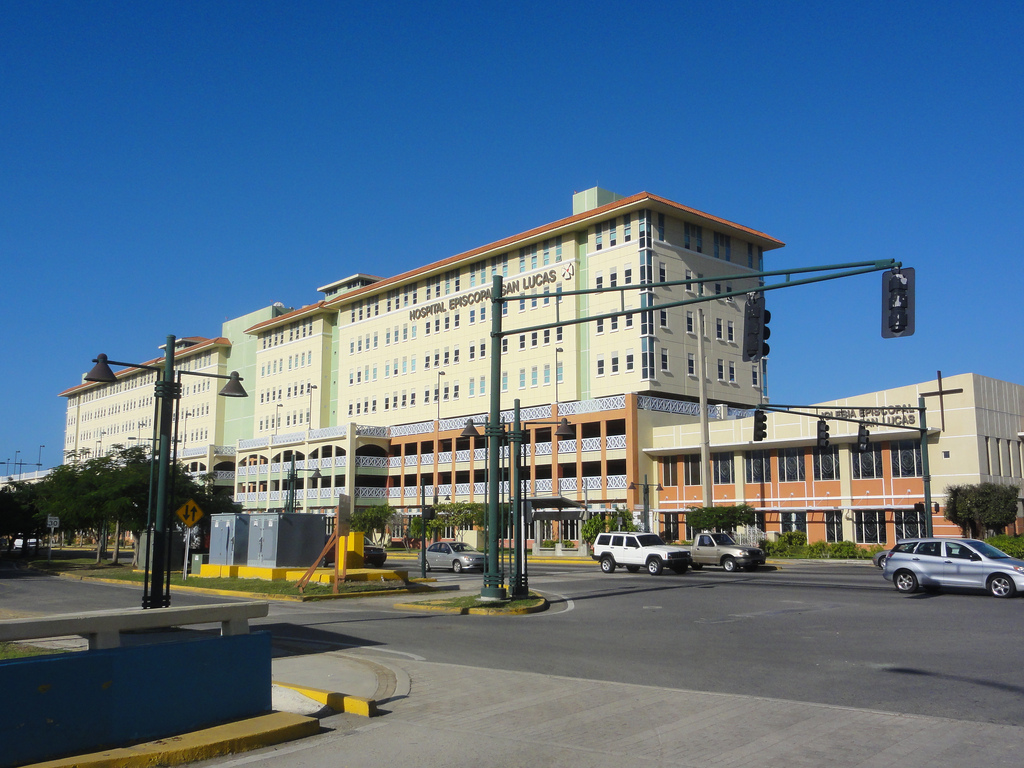
Centro Médico Episcopal San Lucas (2007) in Ponce

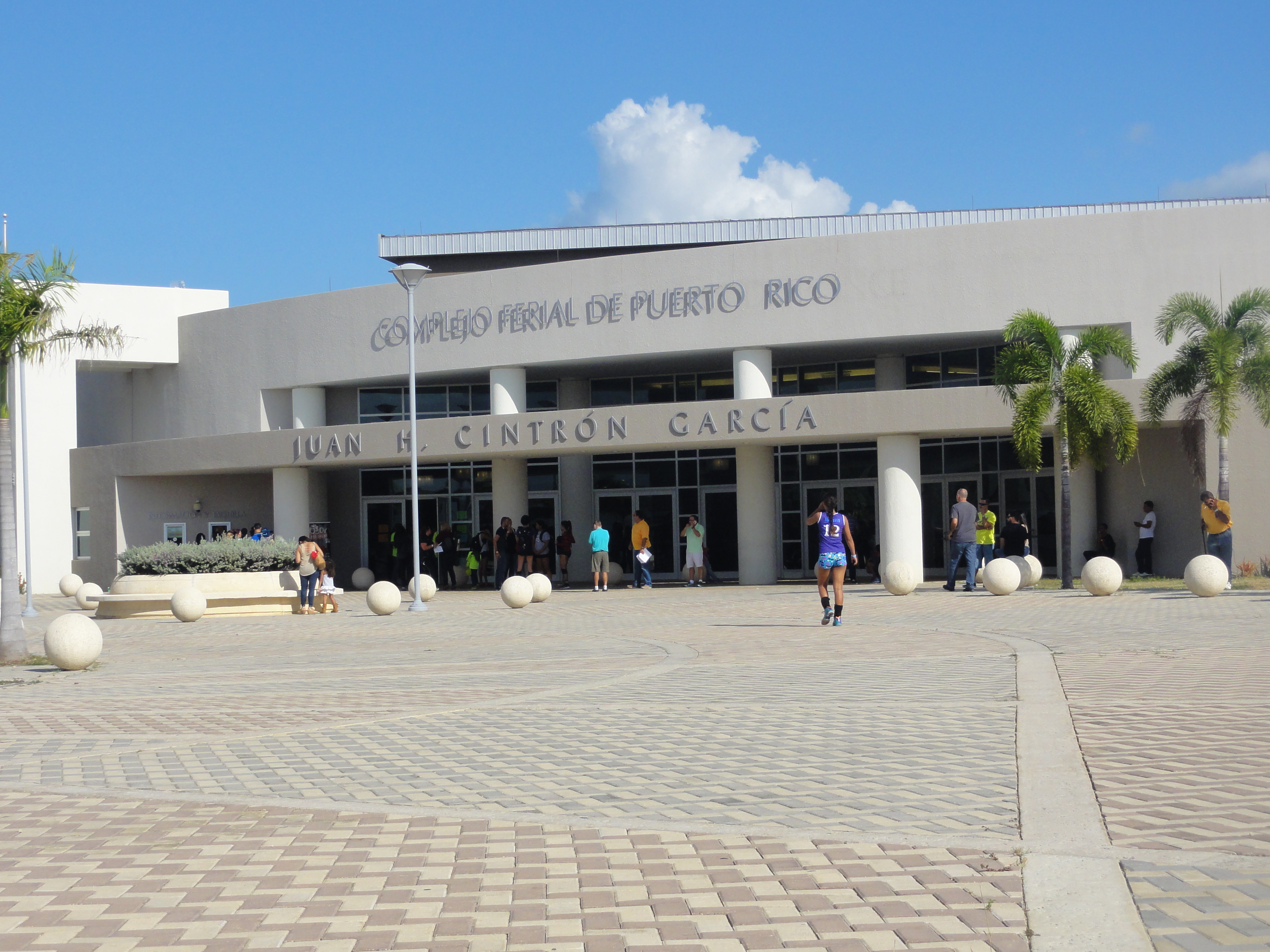
Complejo Ferial de Puerto Rico (2012) in Ponce

=== Neo-Revivalism ===
Puerto Rico also experienced a resurfacing of interest in Revivalism during the 1990s and the start of the 21st century, coinciding with landmark celebrations such as the 500th anniversary of the European settlement of the island and the foundation of San Juan. This time brought about a surge of historical and cultural interests, particularly in the context of the Spanish colonization of Puerto Rico, and reflected into the reemerged use of Neoclassical and Colonial Spanish Revival elements adapted into the postmodern architecture of the 21st century. Projects such as the quincentennial renovations of public areas and infrastructure of Old San Juan informed similar municipal developments in some of the historic downtown areas (pueblos) of Puerto Rico. Interest in historic and cultural preservation also motivated the integration of historic structures into new construction projects, as it can be seen in the Puerto Rico Museum of Art, built in the former 19th century San Juan Municipal Hospital, and the Conservatory of Music of Puerto Rico, built on a former 19th century Spanish convent and school.

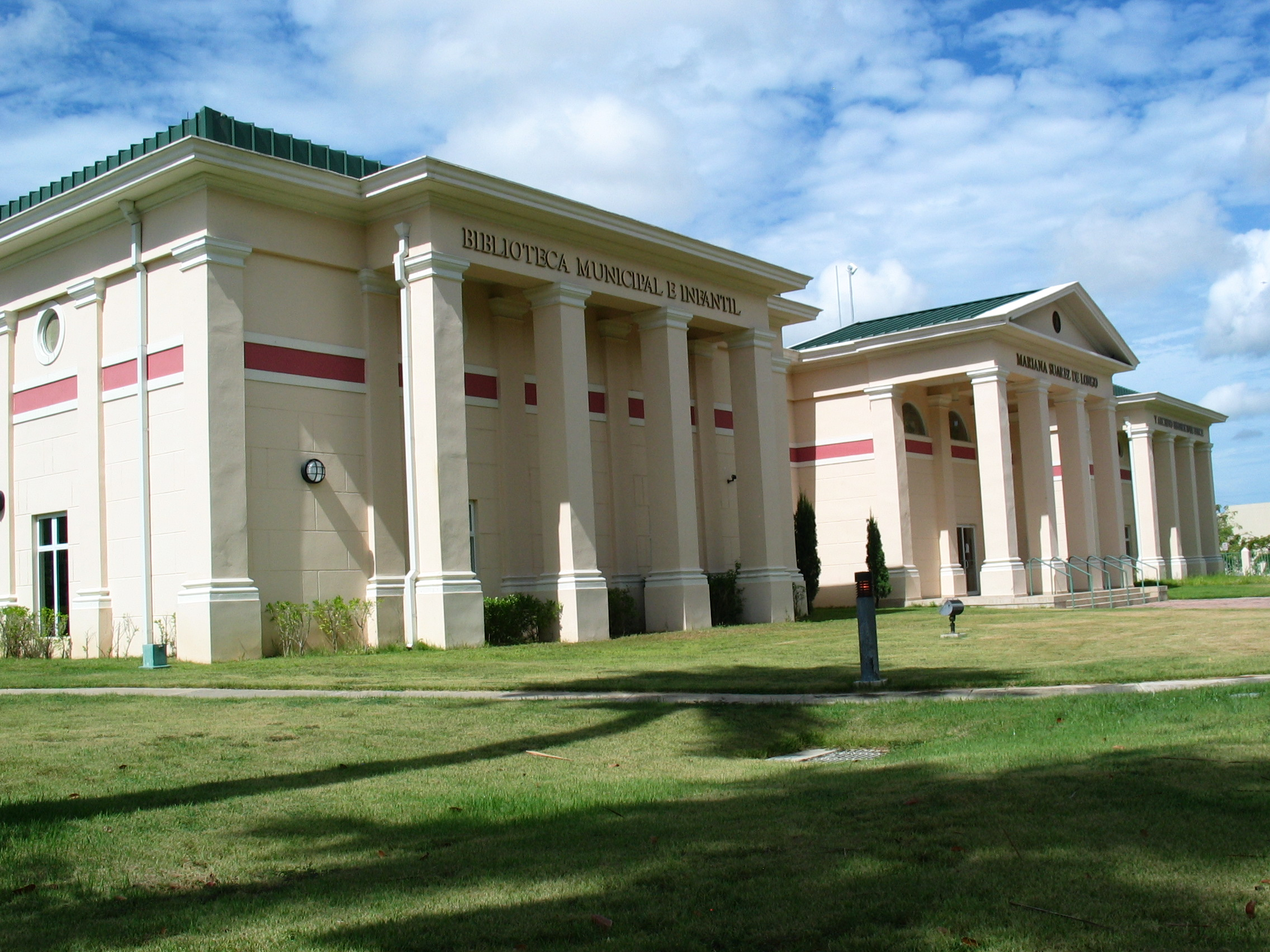
Ponce Municipal Library (2007)

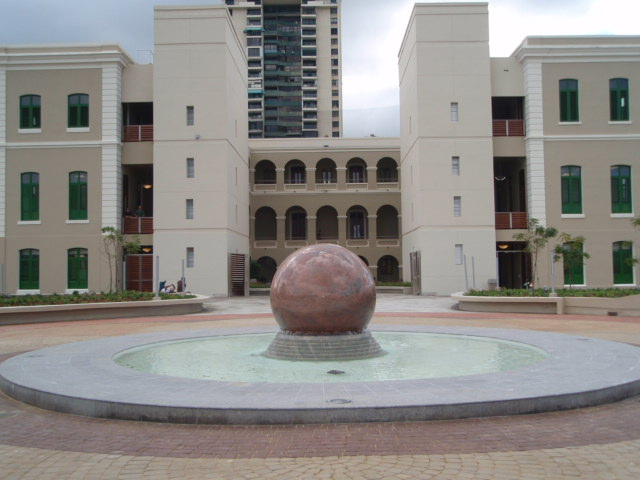
Conservatory of Music of Puerto Rico courtyard (2009) in Santurce

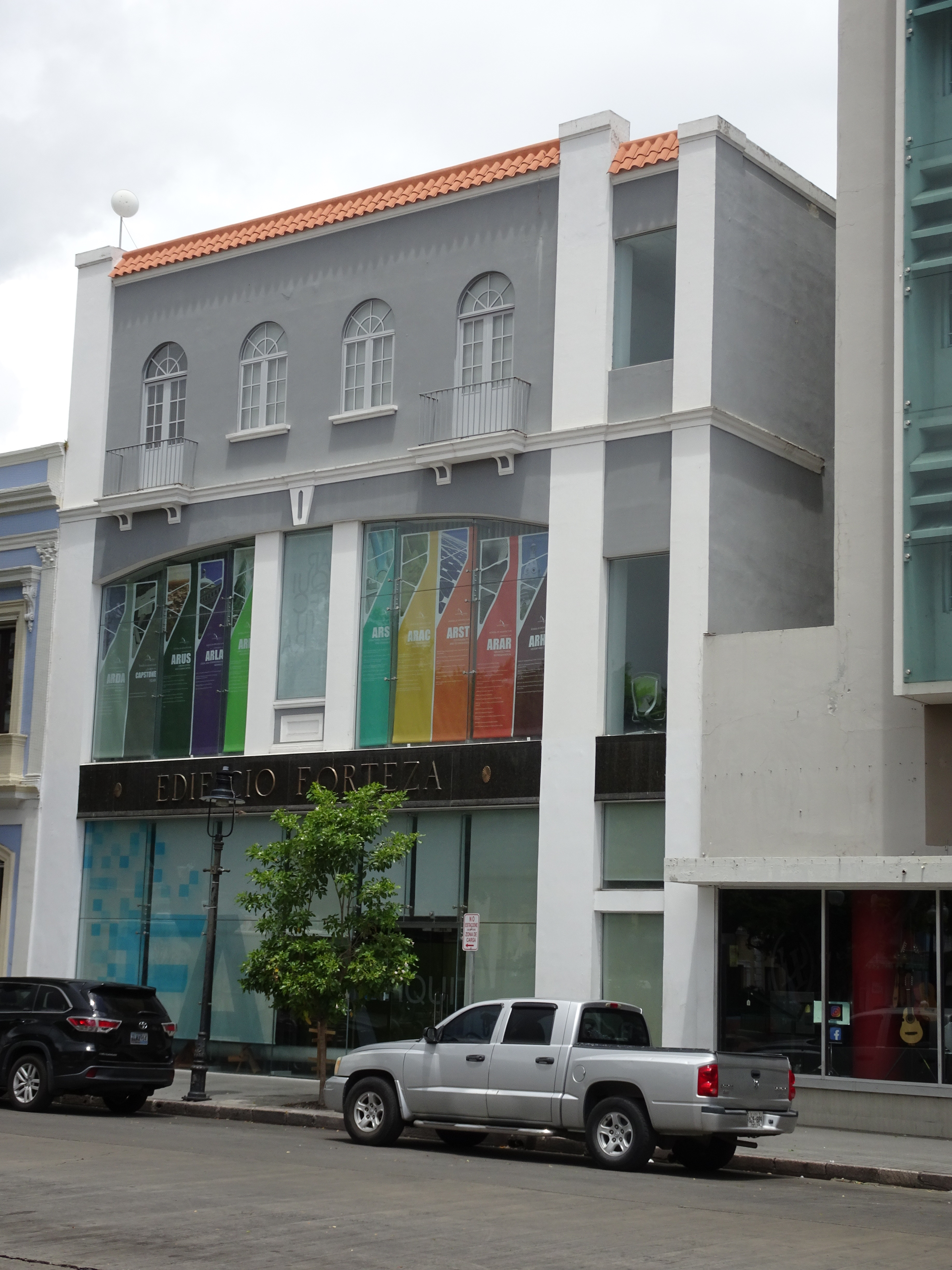
PUCPR School of Architecture (2009) in Ponce

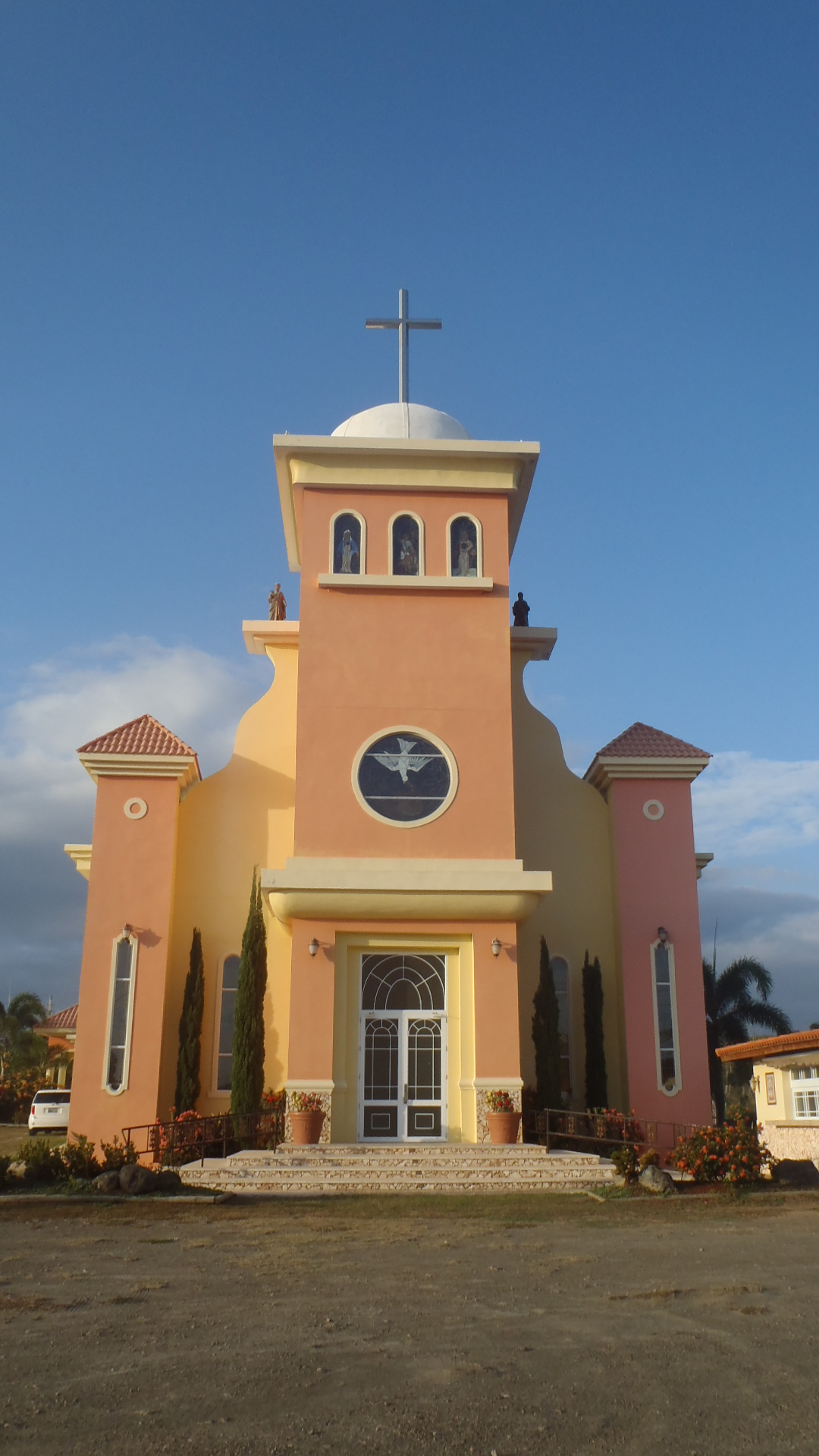
San José Parish of Monte Grande (2011) in Cabo Rojo

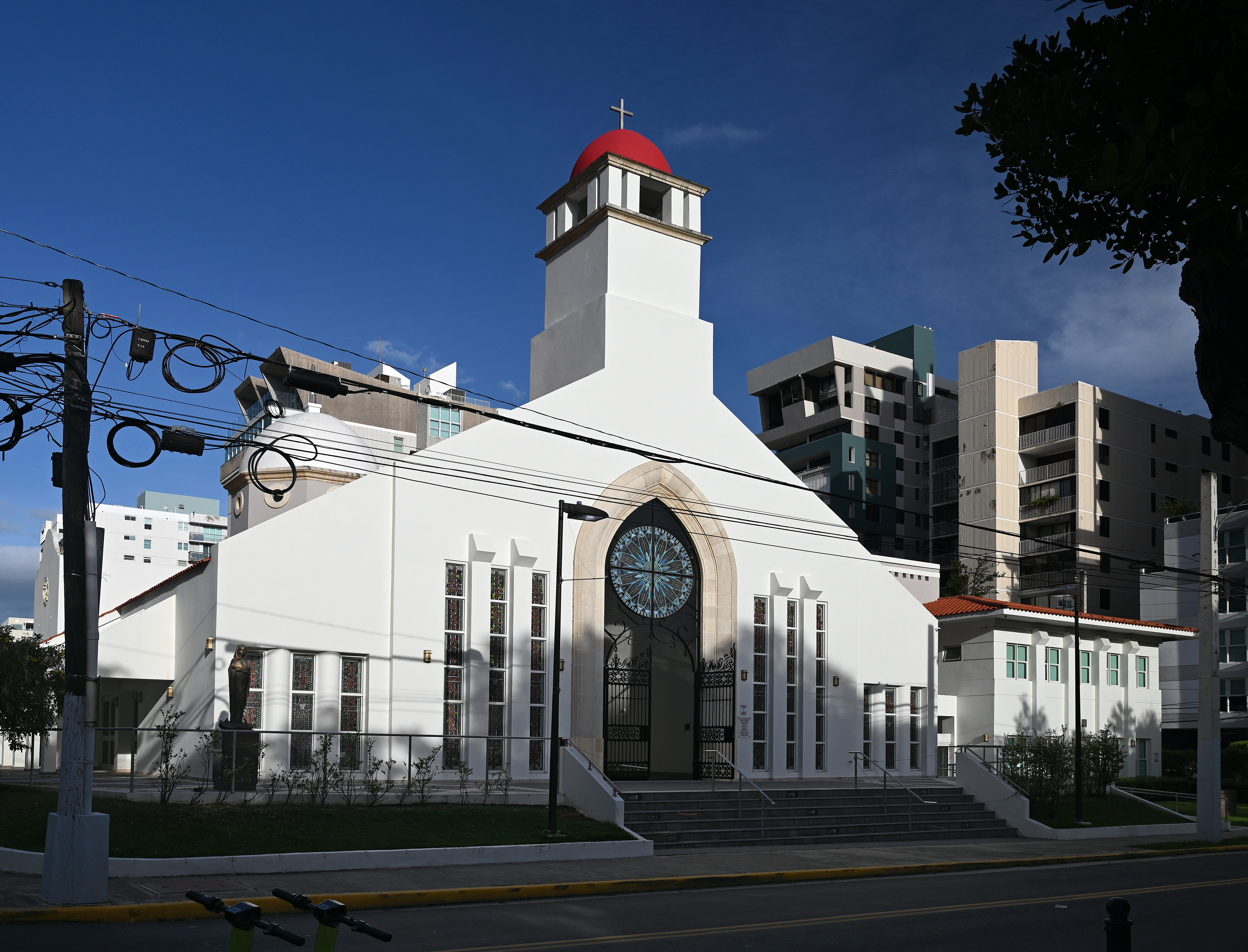
Stella Maris Church (2017) in Condado

=== Contemporary vernacular styles ===
The late 20th century and early 21st century vernacular architecture of Puerto Rico has evolved as a hybrid of tradition and modernity, reflecting both economic realities and cultural identities. Many residential neighborhoods continue to adopt elements of earlier vernacular traditions with flat concrete roofs, louvered windows and deep balconies, but adapted to new materials and construction technologies such as reinforced concrete blocks and decorative cement screens. These houses often prioritize resilience against hurricanes and earthquakes while incorporating stylistic touches raging from Mediterranean Revival details to minimalist lines to even eclectic steel ornamentations also utilized as a safety measure against larceny and burglars. The resulting patchwork has created a living vernacular that feels both rooted in Puerto Rican culture and responsive to 21st-century social and geographical challenges.

Beyond individual homes, commercial and civic architecture in working-class and suburban areas has fully embraced a functional vernacular modernism. Buildings such as schools, community centers and municipal offices frequently display pragmatic designs softened with decorative motifs, bright color palettes, and symbolic and figurative references to their local identity. This reflects both a democratization and vernacular standardization of architectural languages. At the same time, distinctively postmodern vernacular blends have become popular in suburban residential developments and shopping centers, where Revivalist elements, such as arches, red-tile roofs and faux colonial-façades, are combined with sleek modern and expressionist styles. This can be seen in gated communities, commercial strips and mixed-use complexes, where nostalgia for Spanish colonial imagery coexists with the functional demands of parking lots, air conditioning and hurricane-resistant concrete.

== See also ==
- List of Puerto Rican architects
