= Cambalache Forest Reserve =

Forest reserve in Puerto Rico

Cambalache Forest Reserve Spanish: Bosque Estatal de Cambalache
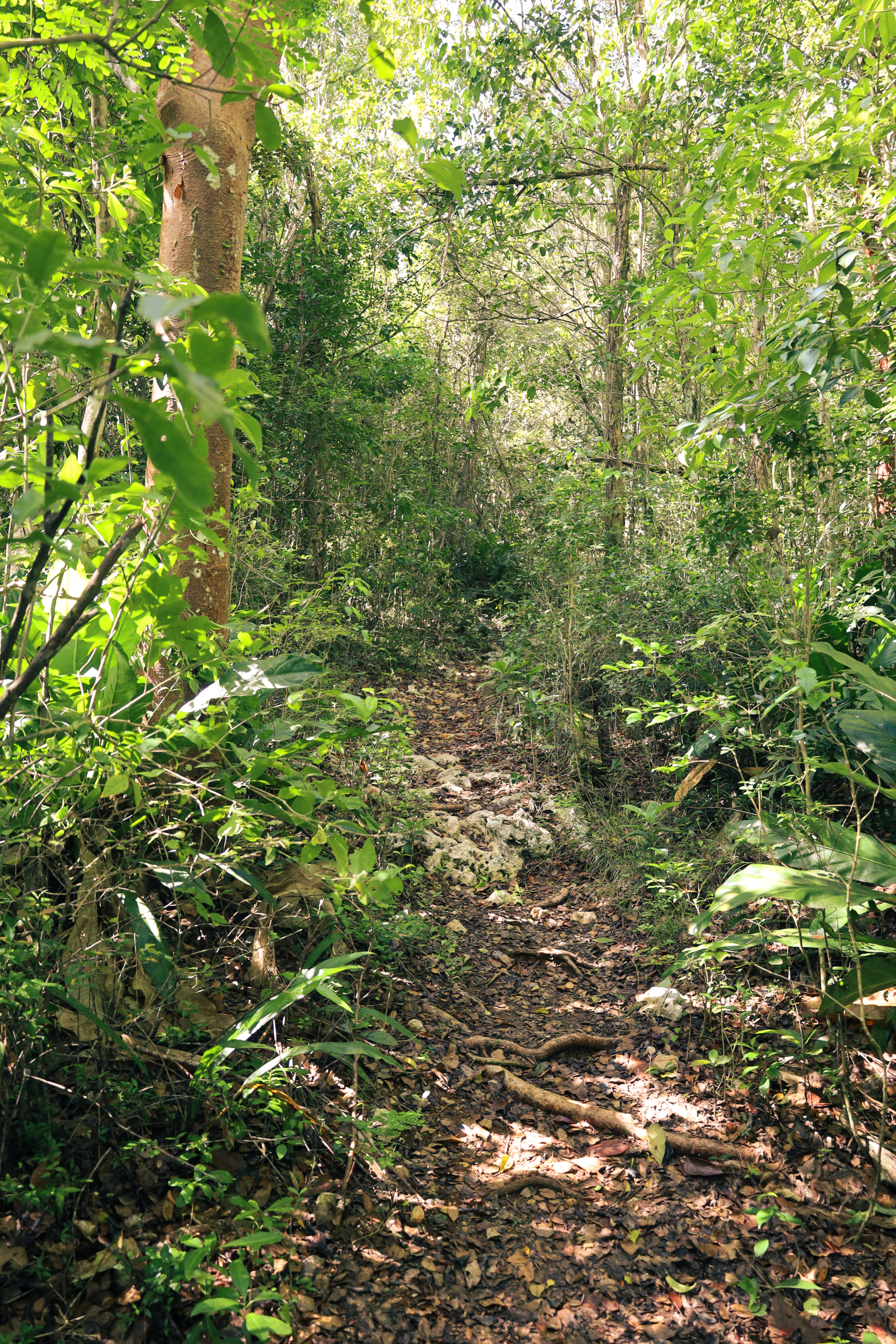

Map
- Interactive map of Cambalache Forest Reserve

Geography
- Location: Arecibo, Barceloneta
- Area: 1,600 cuerdas (1,600 acres)

Administration
- Status: Public, Commonwealth
- Governing body: Puerto Rico Department of Natural and Environmental Resources (DRNA)
- Website: www.drna.gobierno.pr

Ecology
- WWF Classification: Puerto Rican moist forests

Cambalache State Forest and Reserve (Spanish: Bosque Estatal de Cambalache, sometimes also referred to as Parque national de Cambalache) is a nature reserve and one of the 20 state forests in the territory of Puerto Rico. The Cambalache State Forest is located in the municipalities of Arecibo and Barceloneta in northern Puerto Rico.

== History ==
The Cambalache State Forest was proclaimed in 1943 through a deal between the United States Forest Service and the Land Authority of Puerto Rico (Autoridad de Tierras) as part of a research program dedicated to the ecological and geological study of the island's Northern Karst Belt. The forest was first known as the Cambalache Experimental Forest. It was proclaimed a state forest in 1973.

== Description ==
The forest reserve protects steep limestone hills known as mogotes, which are covered in patches of moist forests. The elevation ranges from 5 to 50 m (16 to 164 ft) above mean sea level. Average rainfall is 1,479.8 mm (58.26 in) per year, with the temperature varying from 23.3 to 27 °C (73.9 to 80.6 °F). Mogotes oriented northeast to southeast have humid northern and southwestern slopes but xeric tops. It has an area of 1,050 cuerdas (about 1,019 acres).

The forest is divided into various forest units located throughout the municipalities of Arecibo (Factor, Garrochales, Miraflores, Sabana Hoyos and La Mano Farm) and Barceloneta (Benero and Palenque Farms).

== Ecology and conservation ==
=== Flora ===
More than 150 trees and large shrubs have been identified in the forest. Common trees include Cecropia, Schefflera, and Tabebuia heterophylla. The endemic Puerto Rican royal palm (Roystonea borinquena) and Palma de Sierra (Gaussia attenuata) are also found in the forest. Zanthoxylum martinicense inhabits xeric areas. Eugenia biflora and Eugenia ligustrina are found in the forest. The hillsides and valleys are home to distinct vegetation zones. The valleys have lost most of their original vegetation and instead feature scrubby secondary forests and planted teak groves.

=== Fauna ===
The forest is home to at least two endangered species: the Puerto Rican boa (Epicrates inornatus) and the red fruit bat (Stenoderma rufum). Some other animals found in the forest are the Puerto Rican lizard cuckoo (Coccyzus vieilloti), the Puerto Rican tody (Todus mexicanus), the green mango (Anthracothorax viridis), the Puerto Rican bullfinch (Melopyrrha portoricensis), the Puerto Rican oriole (Icterus portoricensis), and Adelaide's warbler (Setophaga adelaidae). As part of the wider Northern Karst Belt conservation zone, the Cambalache forest reserve has been designated an Important Bird Area by BirdLife International since 2007 due to the high occurrence of both endemic and migratory species. There is also a large variety of butterfly species, some of which are rare.

== Recreation ==
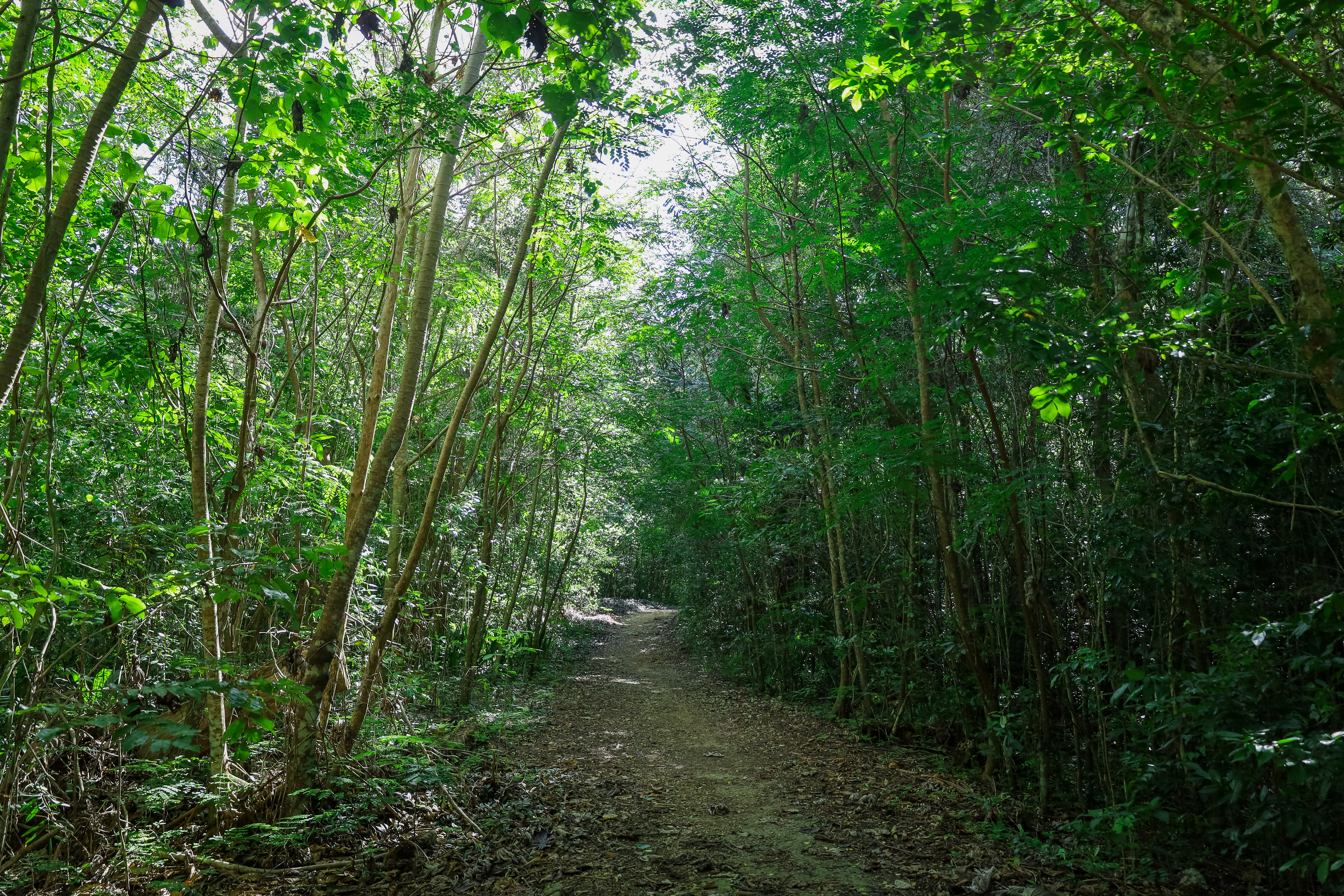
Hiking trail in the Garrochales section of the forest.

Parts of the forest are open to visitors with opportunities for bird and butterfly watching, hiking, camping and biking. The visitors' area is located at PR-682, by highway PR-22.

== See also ==
- List of Puerto Rico state forests
- List of National Natural Landmarks in Puerto Rico
