= Clear Channel Outdoor =

American outdoor advertising company

Clear Channel Outdoor Holdings, Inc.
- Type: Public
- Traded as: NYSE: CCO; Russell 2000 Component
- Industry: Real estate investment trust, outdoor advertising
- Predecessor: Foster & Kleiser; Patrick Media Outdoor; Eller Media Company
- Founded: 1901; 125 years ago (as Foster & Kleiser)
- Founder: Lowry Mays; Karl Eller
- Headquarters: San Antonio, Texas, US
- Key people: Scott Wells (CEO, Clear Channel Outdoor Holdings, Inc. & Clear Channel Outdoor Americas); William Eccleshare (Executive Vice Chairman, CCOH Board of Directors)
- Revenue: US$ 2.68 billion (2019)
- Operating income: US$ 253 million (2019)
- Net income: US$ −363 million (2019)
- Total assets: US$ 6.39 billion (2019)
- Total equity: US$ −2.05 billion (2019)
- Number of employees: 5,900 (2019)
- Parent: IHeartMedia (50%); Mubadala Investment Company (50%)
- Website: clearchanneloutdoor.com

Clear Channel Outdoor Holdings, Inc. is an American advertising company which operates billboards, logo signs, and transit displays and focused on outdoor advertising. The company is based in San Antonio, Texas.

== History ==
=== Founding and predecessor companies ===
Clear Channel Outdoor Americas (CCOA) was one of the first outdoor advertising companies in the United States and is one of the largest. It has origins in three major predecessor companies: Foster & Kleiser (F&K) (1901–1986), Patrick Media Outdoor (1986–1995), and Eller Media Company (1995–2001). F&K changed its name to Patrick Media Group after Metromedia sold the company to Scranton, PA-based Patrick Media Group and a major investor group led by General Electric, and it was acquired in turn by Karl Eller in 1995.

Alongside this outdoor advertising consolidation, the Mays family in San Antonio, Texas, founded a broadcasting company in 1972, which would become known as Clear Channel Communications. By the mid-1990s, Clear Channel Communications owned 43 radio and 16 television stations. By 2004, Clear Channel owned more than 1,200 radio stations and 36 television stations in the United States and 770,000 billboards globally.

Along the way, CCO further consolidated operations by acquiring Universal Outdoor (Naegele, Derse, POA, Revere), Donrey, Paxton Outdoor, Ackerley Media, Badger Outdoor, ABC Outdoor, and Hansen Outdoor, to name a few of the larger transactions.

=== Expansion and iHeartMedia ===
In November 2005, Clear Channel Outdoor Holdings, Inc. (NYSE:CCO) and its parent company, Clear Channel Communications, Inc. (NYSE:CCU) announced the initial public offering of 35,000,000 shares of Class A common stock of Clear Channel Outdoor Holdings at a price of $18.00 per share, for a total offering of $630,000,000.

In 2006, CCOH acquired Interspace Airport Advertising and began operating as Clear Channel Interspace Airports. In 2009, the airports media sales business began operating as Clear Channel Airports. Today, Clear Channel Airports manages advertising and marketing contracts in more than 260 airports across the world.

In 2007, Clear Channel Outdoor began its partnership with the FBI to display fugitives and missing persons on billboards across the United States.

In 2008, Clear Channel was taken private by firms Thomas H. Lee Partners and Bain Capital LLC, and the Mays family divested their interests in the company.

In September 2014, CCO's then-parent parent company changed its name from Clear Channel Communications, Inc. to iHeartMedia. The outdoor advertising entity retained the Clear Channel name to protect that trademark.

In 2015, Scott Wells became CEO of Clear Channel Outdoor Americas. He is responsible for all CCOA's business in the U.S., and its Caribbean-based airport media sales operations.

In 2016, CCOA proved the effectiveness of the Out-of-Home (OOH) medium and announced the industry's first measurable outdoor advertising solution known as CCO RADAR. CCO executed this using aggregated and anonymized mobile location data from privacy compliant data providers.

On January 7, 2016, Lamar Advertising Company purchased Clear Channel Outdoor's assets in 5 major U.S. city markets for $458.5 million.

In 2016, CCOA introduced the automated ability (programmatic) for advertisers to buy ads on its various digital outdoor formats using computer programs.

=== Spin-off out of iHeartMedia ===
On December 21, 2018, iHeartMedia announced its intent to spin out its majority stake in Clear Channel Outdoor, as part of a proposed reorganization plan to reduce debt and exit its Chapter 11 bankruptcy. The reorganization plan was approved by the U.S. Bankruptcy Court for the Southern District of Texas in January 2019, and was completed in May 2019. This made Clear Channel an independent company, and Clear Channel International (CCI) CEO William Eccleshare became the new worldwide CEO. He remains in London in addition to his responsibilities as the worldwide CEO, he continues to lead CCI.

Under the Clear Channel umbrella, Clear Channel Outdoor was built from the acquisition of Eller Media, Universal Outdoor, and More Group Plc, giving iHeartMedia outdoor advertising space in 25 countries, while CCO also has a stake in Jolly Pubblicita S.p.A. of Italy. Other units of CCO include:

- BBH Exhibits
- Yellow Checker Star Cab Displays
- Dauphin OTA (created by Jacques Dauphin)
- Donrey Media, Ackerley Media
- Companies in Chile, Poland, and Switzerland
- APN News & Media in Australia (49% stake, including Adshel)

In the United States, CCO operates over 1,100 digital billboards in 27 markets. Taxi Tops was sold to Verifone in January 2010.

On February 9, 2026, Mubadala Investment Company acquired Clear Channel Outdoor for all-cash transaction values Clear Channel at an enterprise value of $6.2 billion.

On May 21, 2026, Clear Channel Outdoor announced Clear Channel Impact for a new marketing solution that enables brands and billboards to turn their existing advertising investments nationwide.

== Corporate structure ==
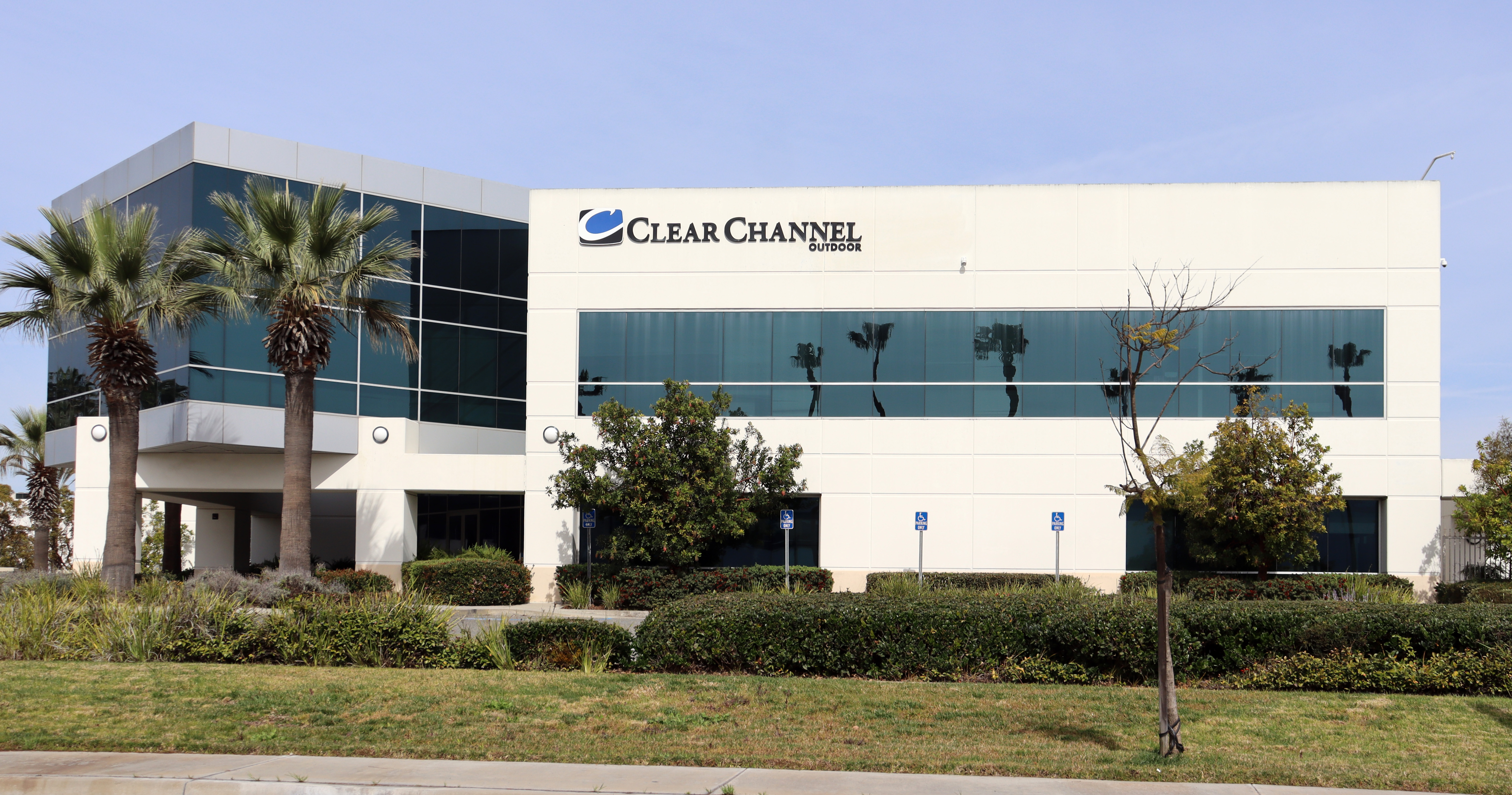
Clear Channel Outdoor's branch office in Los Angeles

Following a separation from its former parent company, iHeartMedia, Inc., in May 2019, CCOH, Inc. has operated as an independent, publicly traded company on the New York Stock Exchange (NYSE: CCO).

In the U.S., Clear Channel Outdoor Americas offers outdoor advertising in 43 of the top 50 markets and maintains an office and operations presence employing over 1,500 people. Across its roadside and street level market footprint, CCOA offers tens of thousands of printed billboards in a variety of formats.

CCOA is one of two separate business units operating as part of Clear Channel Outdoor Holdings, Inc. (CCOH). The other business unit, Clear Channel International (CCI), includes Europe, Singapore and Latin America. Globally, both CCOA and CCI employ 5,800 people.

== See also ==
- Billboard advertising
- Digital billboard
- Lamar Advertising Company
- Outfront Media
