= Lamar Advertising Company =

American outdoor advertising company

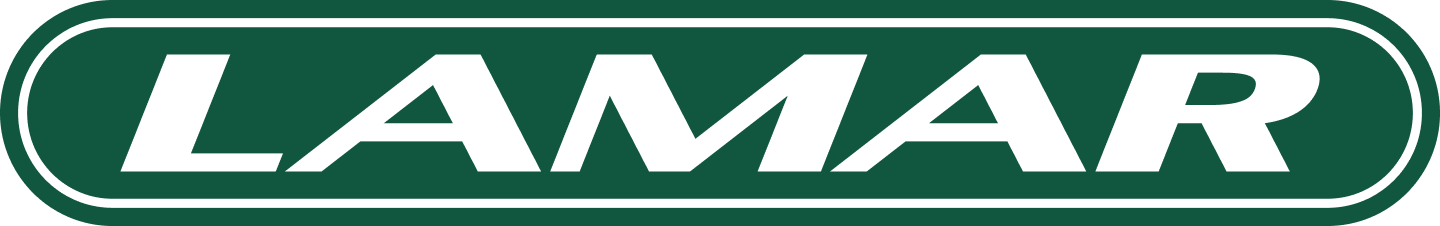
- Type: Public
- Traded as: Nasdaq: LAMR (Class A); S&P 400 component
- Industry: Real estate investment trust, outdoor advertising
- Founded: 1902; 124 years ago
- Founder: Charles W. Lamar
- Headquarters: Baton Rouge, Louisiana, U.S.
- Key people: Kevin P. Reilly, Sr. (retired CEO); Kevin Reilly, Jr. (president and chairman of the board); Sean Reilly (CEO)
- Products: Billboards, transit advertising
- Revenue: US$1.57 billion
- Number of employees: 3,300
- Website: lamar.com

Lamar Advertising Company is an American advertising company which operates billboards, logo signs, and transit displays in the United States and Canada and focused on outdoor advertising. The company was founded in 1902 by Charles W. Lamar and J.M. Coe, and is headquartered in Baton Rouge, Louisiana. The company has over 200 locations in the United States and Canada. They have reportedly more than 363,000 displays across the USA. Lamar Advertising Company became a real estate investment trust in 2014.

== History ==
Lamar Advertising Company was founded in 1902 by J.M. Coe and Charles W. Lamar. The Company became independent under its current name in 1908 in Pensacola, Florida, when Charles W. Lamar Sr. and J.M. Coe decided to dissolve their three-year partnership using a coin toss to divide their assets. The Pensacola Opera House and the Pensacola Advertising Company that was created to be divided between the two men. Charles W. Lamar lost the toss and was left with the less-lucrative poster company, which he renamed the Lamar Outdoor Advertising Company.

The Pensacola Opera House was destroyed during Hurricane Four of the 1917 Atlantic hurricane season, with the Saenger Theatre later built on the site.

On August 2, 1996, following an initial public offering (IPO), Lamar Advertising Company began trading on the NASDAQ with the ticker symbol LAMR. Shortly after the IPO filing, Lamar would go on to acquire several outdoor advertising companies across the United States; in September of 1996, the company acquired over 1,175 displays in Corpus Christi and Laredo, Texas from Revere National Corporation for $9 million, as well as 334 displays in the Panama City, Florida market from Southworth Advertising for $1 million. Later that month, the company announced it acquired FKM Advertising for $40 million, adding a total of 1,209 displays across Ohio and Pennsylvania (659 in the Youngstown market, and 550 on major highways in Pennsylvania). In October, the company acquired Outdoor East for $60 million, adding more than 3,800 displays across the southeastern United States. These acquisitions marked Lamar's entry into new markets in North Carolina, Pennsylvania, South Carolina, and West Virginia. Both the FKM and Outdoor East acquisitions were completed by the end of the year.

In October 2004, Lamar swapped assets in South Carolina and Georgia to Fairway Outdoor Advertising, in exchange for the Palm Springs, CA; Fayetteville, NC; Rocky Mount, NC; and New Bern, NC assets. Later in November, Lamar acquired Obie Media Corporation of Eugene, Oregon, adding outdoor displays in Idaho, Oregon, and Washington; as well as handling transit advertising contracts in a few areas.

In January 2016, Lamar purchased advertising rights in five major American markets from Clear Channel Outdoor for $458.5 million.

== See also ==
- Billboard advertising
- Digital billboard
- Clear Channel Outdoor
- Outfront Media
