= CBS Outdoor =

CBS Outdoor may refer to:

- CBS Outdoor Americas which has now been rebranded as Outfront Media
- CBS Outdoor International which has now been rebranded as Exterion Media
