= Logo sign =

Road sign

An example of a typical American logo sign

Logo signs (also known as specific service signs or Logo service signs, or colloquially as Big Blue Signs) are blue road signs used on freeways that display the logos or trademarks of nearby businesses before travelers reach an exit or interchange that leads to the businesses. Typically, a business pays a small fee to a transportation department (or to a subcontractor of a transportation department such as Outfront Advertising and Lamar Advertising, a subsidiary of Interstate Logos) to have their logos displayed on a large panel alongside other businesses. Depending on the jurisdiction, businesses may have to meet certain criteria such as hours of service and distance from the sign.

== History ==
Logo signs were permitted on rural Interstates beginning in 1965 as part of the Highway Beautification Act, though the signs did not come into general use, especially in the western states, until the mid 1970s. Originally, such signs were generally limited to gas, food, and lodging.

== In the United States ==
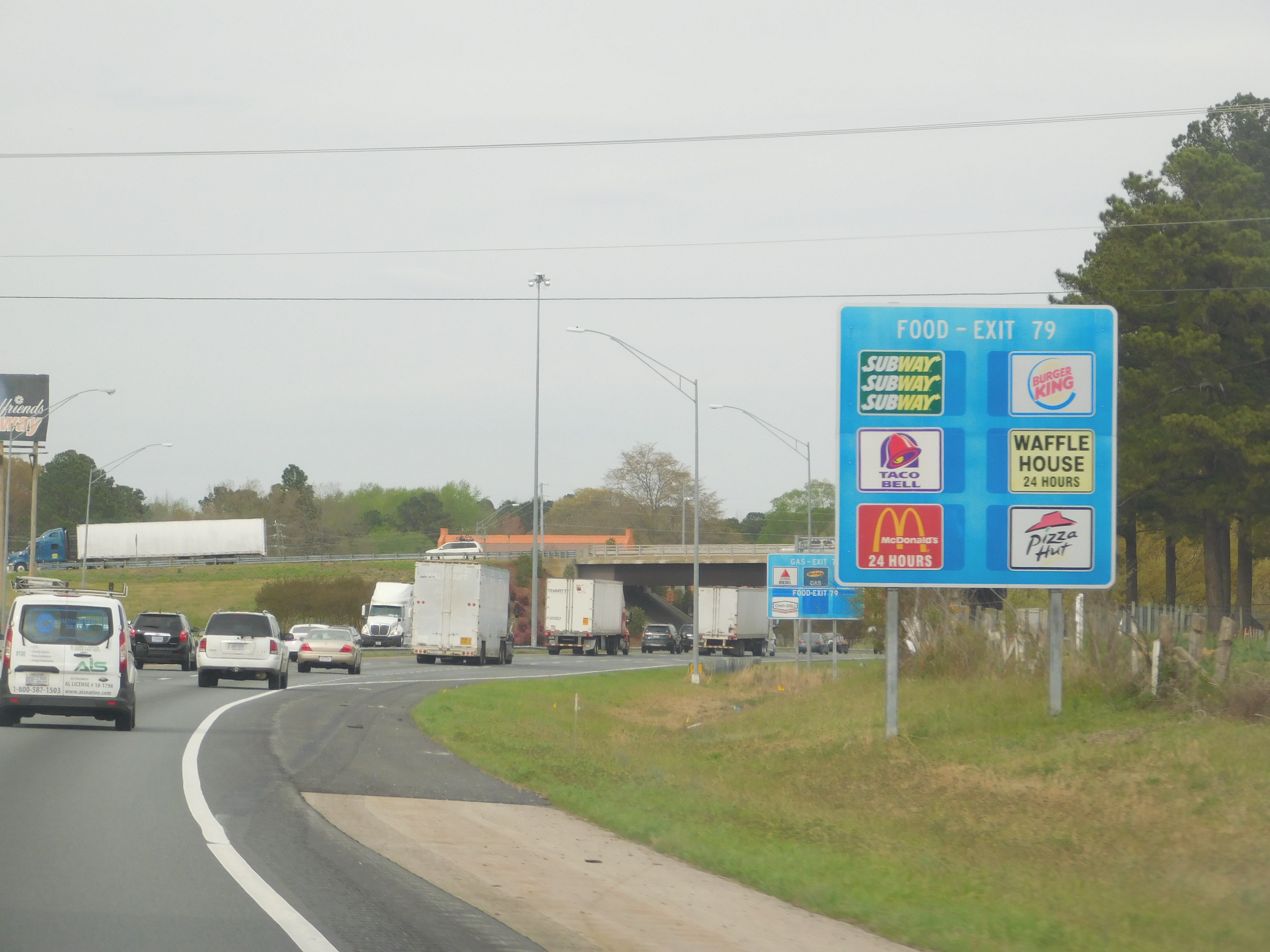
At exits with many services, each kind of service is posted on a separate sign spaced some distance apart.

The 1976 amendments to the Highway Beautification Act expanded the program to federal-aid primary rural highways. In 2000, provisions for allowing logo signs on urban highways (as long as adequate sign spacing can be maintained) were added to the Manual on Uniform Traffic Control Devices; however, as of 2018 not all states have adopted these provisions, with some states (such as California and New York) continuing to restrict the installation of logo signs to rural highways only. As of 2018, logo signs are permitted on urban highways in 18 states, (Note: Arizona, Colorado, Florida, Georgia, Iowa, Louisiana, Massachusetts, Minnesota, Nevada, New Jersey, North Carolina, Oregon, Tennessee, Texas, Utah, Virginia, Washington, and Wisconsin.) with Tennessee being the most recent state (as of 2015) to repeal the restriction for installing logo signs on rural highways only. The 2000 MUTCD also added the attractions category, followed by the 2003 MUTCD which added the 24-hour pharmacies category. Logo signs in the United States are limited to six logos per sign, and additional signs may be used up to a total of four in each direction per interchange. In 2006, the Federal Highway Administration issued an interim approval to allow more than six logo panels per service type on up to two signs per direction, which was eventually incorporated into the 2009 Manual on Uniform Traffic Control Devices.

In E-470 on Colorado, the label "ATTRACTION" is replaced by "BUSINESS". In California, as well as on the Pennsylvania Turnpike the label "GAS" is replaced by "FUEL".

As of December 2025, 22 state transportation departments operated their own logo sign programs, while the other 28 states had privatized their programs by awarding a contract to a for-profit business to install and maintain the signs. Interstate Logos, a subsidiary of Lamar Advertising Company, holds 24 of these 28 contracts, while three others were held by Lonestar Logos. Fees charged to participating businesses are often higher in privatized programs. For example, the North Carolina Department of Transportation previously charged a flat rate of $1,200 per year to all advertisers, and after the state privatized the program in July 2025, prices were raised according to traffic counts on the relevant highways, increasing to as much as $3,800 per year. In the first quarter of private operation, this produced $4.9 million in new revenue for the state.

=== In Puerto Rico ===
SunColors contracted with Metropistas in 2019 to provide logo signs for Puerto Rico highways PR-5 and PR-22.

== In Canada ==
Logo signs are found along major highways in Ontario, namely 400-series highways 400 and 401. A separate signage is used for ONroute rest areas.

== In the United Kingdom ==
Example sign for Lancaster Services, showing the distance, operator of the facility Moto and the companies present such as BP and Burger King.

Logo signs are found before many motorway services in the United Kingdom. They were introduced in 2011 after operators of such services were renaming subsidiaries to get around regulations which forbid brand names from appearing on road signs. Alongside the logo for the operator of the site, the signs can contain up to six brand logos of companies that are present at the services, however the company providing fuel must be listed first. Unlike other motorway road signs in the United Kingdom, these signs are the property of the services operator, not the owners of the motorway network, National Highways.
