= Puerto Rico Highway 22 =

Highway in Puerto Rico

Highway 22
- Ruta 22
- Autopista José de Diego
- PR-22 highlighted in red

Route information
- Maintained by Metropistas
- Length: 84.3 km (52.4 mi)
- Existed: 1969–present

Major junctions
- West end: PR-2 in Carrizales
- PR-129 in Hato Abajo; PR-10 in Tanamá; PR-149 in Coto Norte; PR-2 in Bajura; PR-167 in Hato Tejas; PR-5 in Juan Sánchez–Palmas; PR-165 in Pueblo Viejo; PR-2 in Pueblo Viejo; PR-18 in Hato Rey Norte; PR-1 in Santurce
- East end: PR-26 in Santurce

Location
- Country: United States
- Territory: Puerto Rico
- Municipalities: Hatillo, Arecibo, Barceloneta, Manatí, Vega Baja, Vega Alta, Dorado, Toa Baja, Bayamón, Cataño, Guaynabo, San Juan

Highway system
- Roads in Puerto Rico; List
← PR-21	→ PR-23

Puerto Rico Highway 22 (PR-22), also part of unsigned Interstate PR2, is an 84.3 km (52.4 mi) long toll road on the north coast of Puerto Rico that connects the cities of San Juan and Hatillo. The road is also known as the José de Diego Expressway (Spanish: Expreso José de Diego), and is part of unsigned Interstate PR-2. It is a 4-lane road for much of its length, but expands to up to 12 lanes in the San Juan metro area. The road is frequently congested, in particular during rush hour due to heavy commuter traffic.

== Route description ==
PR-22 is Puerto Rico's most traveled highway. PR-22 runs parallel to PR-2 and is concurrent with unsigned Interstate Highway PRI-2. Unlike PR-22, PR-2 is not a controlled-access road, and has numerous traffic signals throughout the full run of its course. The construction of highway PR-22 reduced congestion on PR-2. The eastern terminus is at PR-26 (a non-tolled freeway) in Santurce, and passes through the Minillas Tunnel before its terminus at PR-26. The freeway bypasses all of the cities PR-2 passes through (see below under "Course of the Expressway"). PR-22's western terminus is at PR-2 in Hatillo. From there, PR-2 continues to Aguadilla and Mayagüez, ending in Ponce.

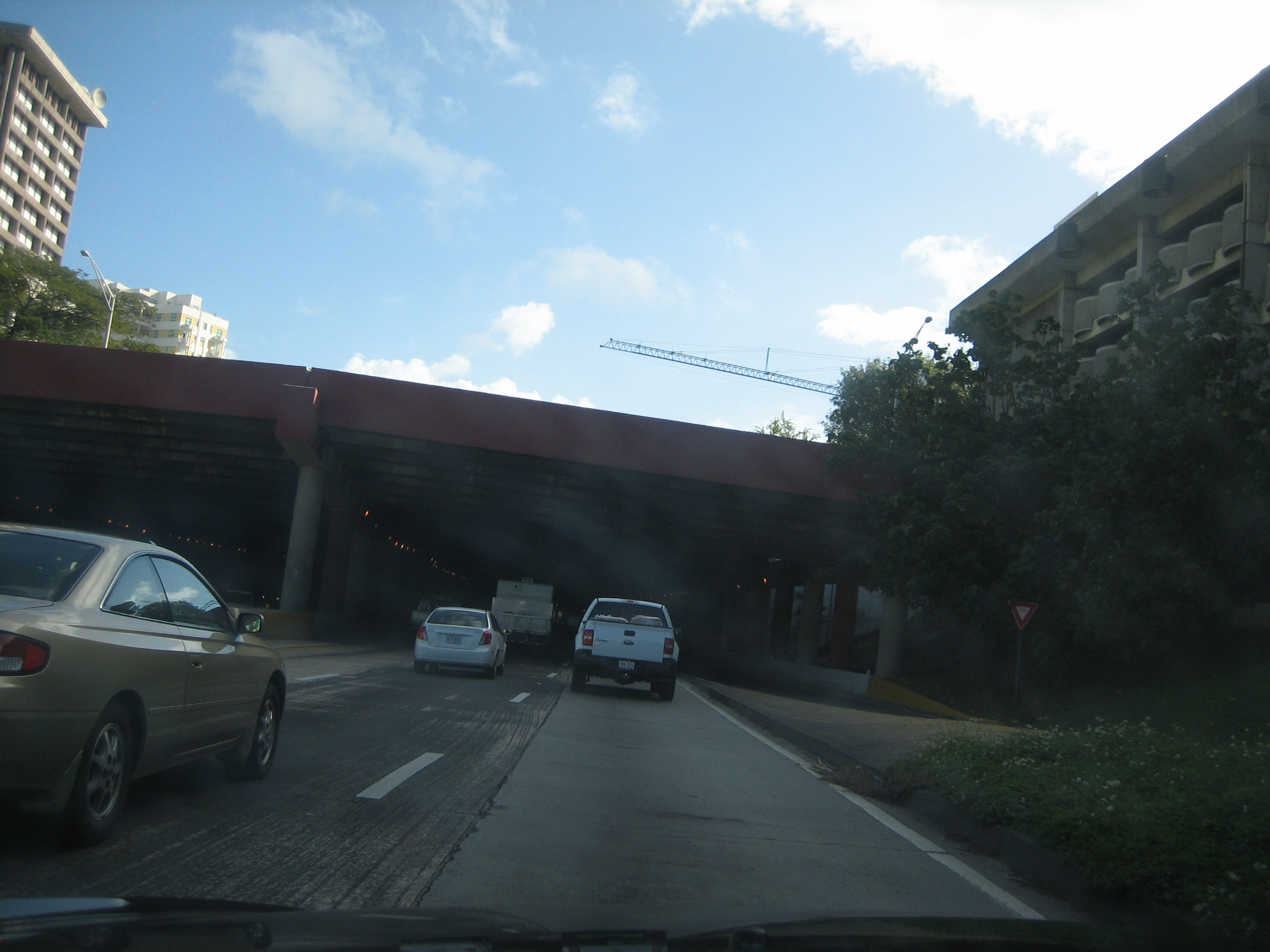
PR-22 begins in San Juan through Minillas Tunnel

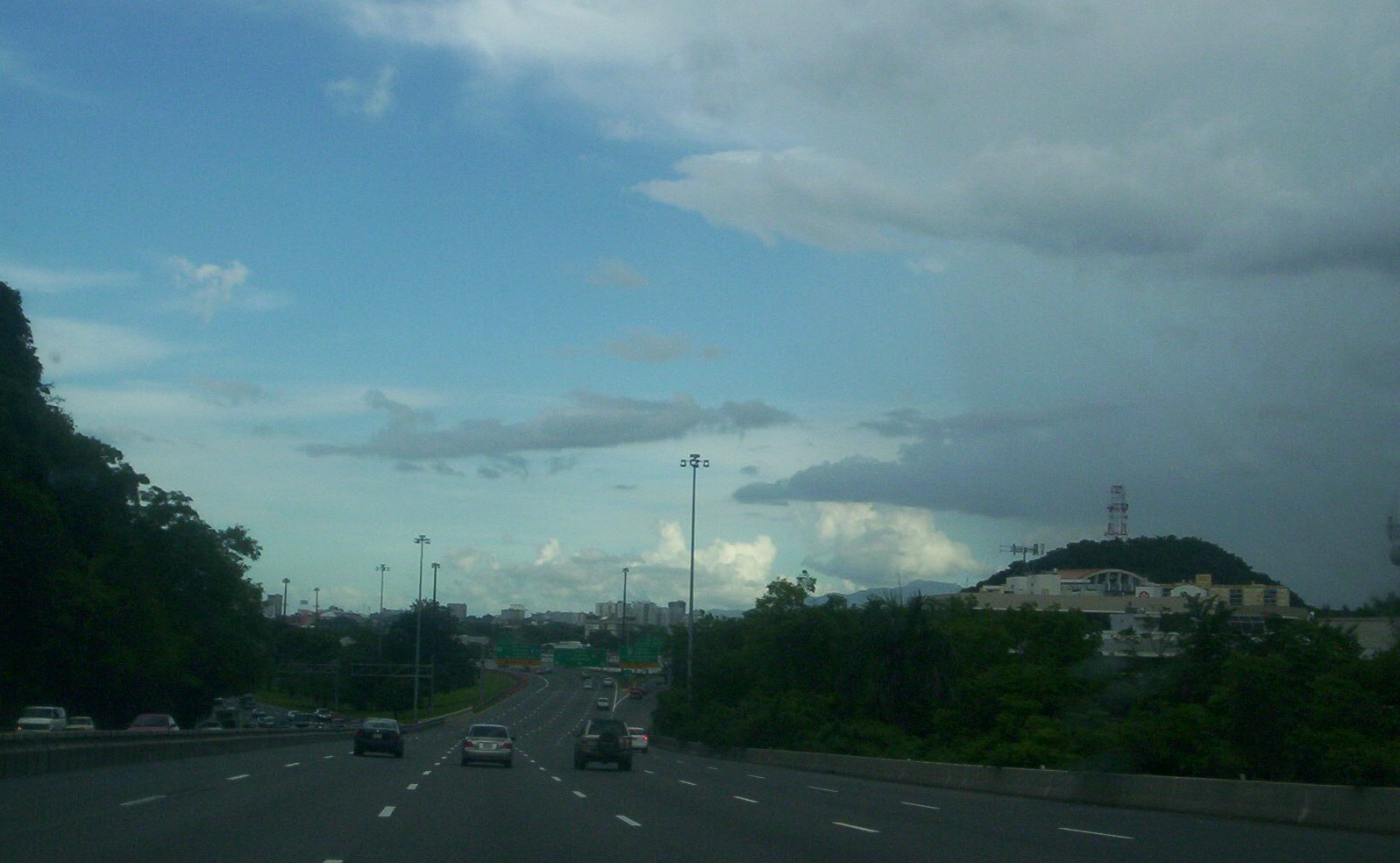
PR-22 enters the city of San Juan. The San Juan skyline is visible in the background

=== Municipalities served ===
Puerto Rico Highway 22 by municipality

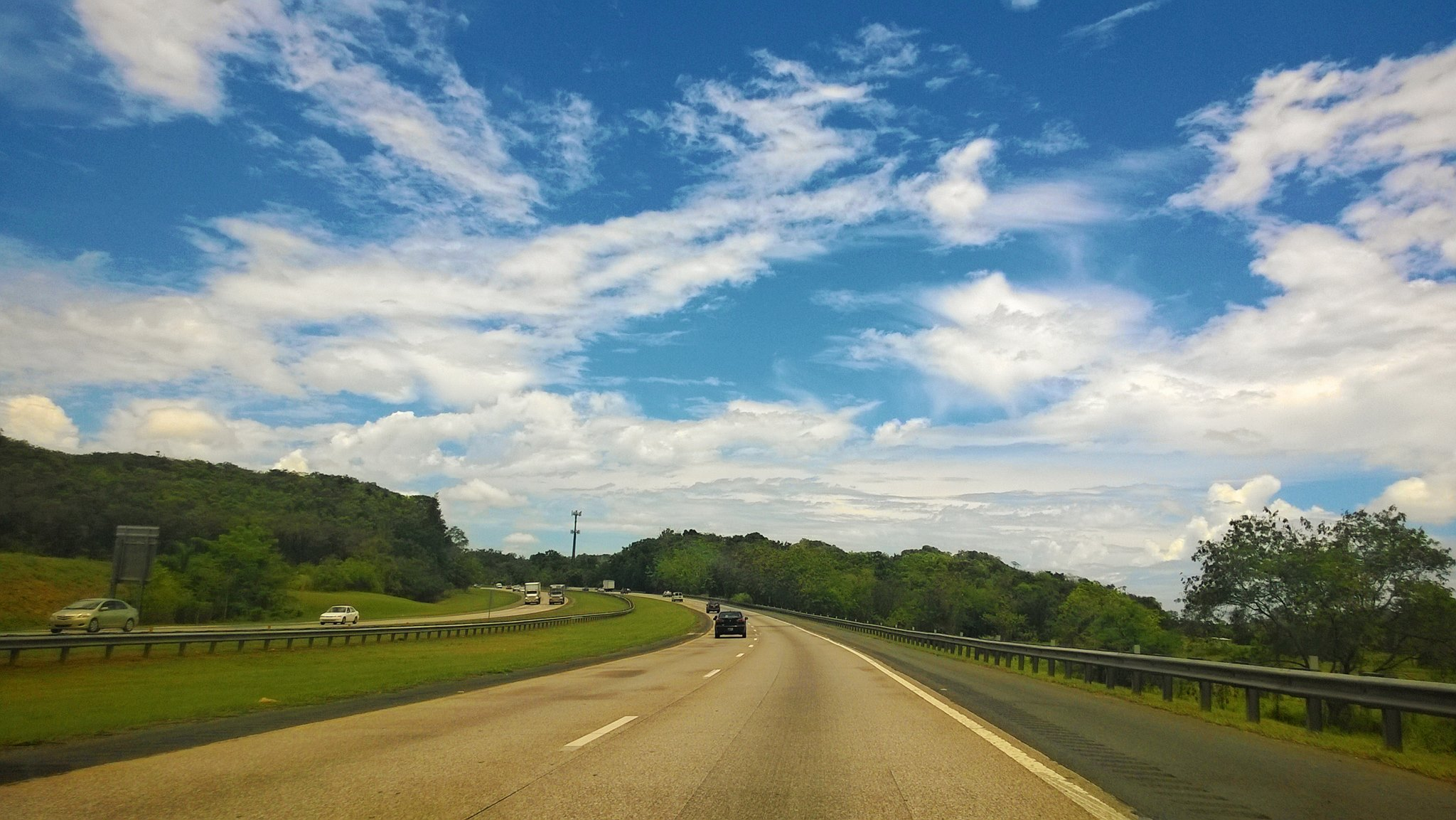
Heading west in Dorado

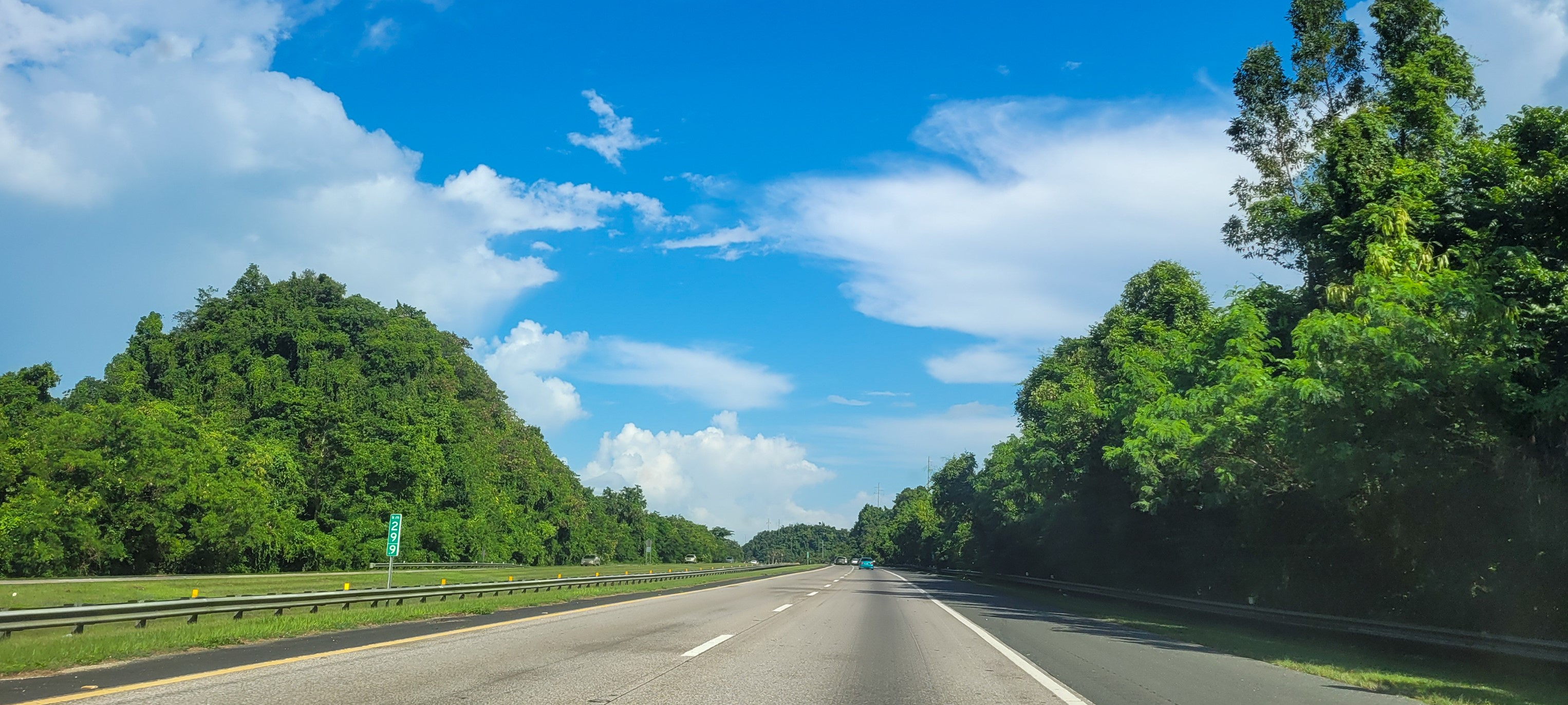
Heading east in Vega Alta

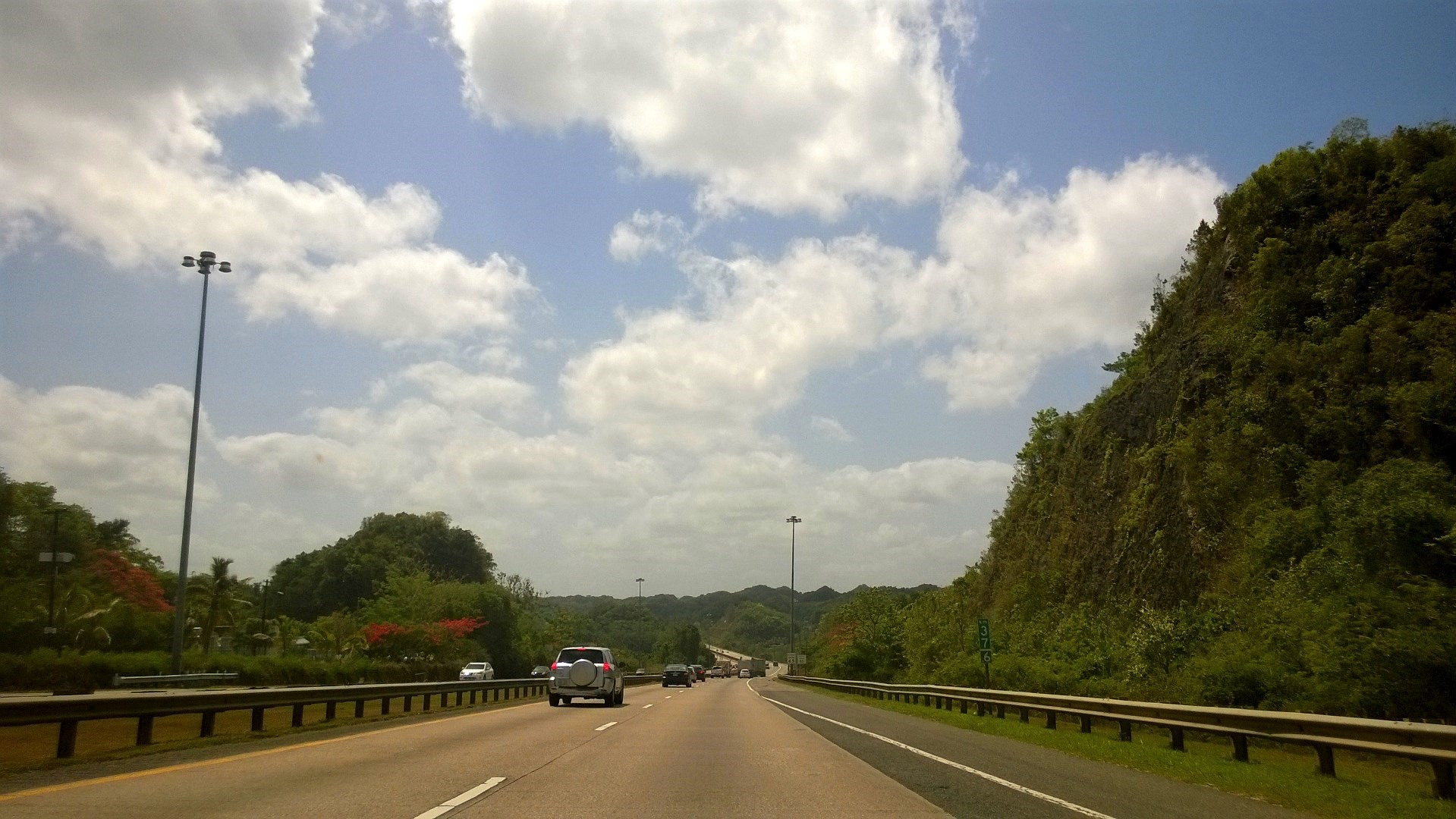
Heading east in Vega Baja

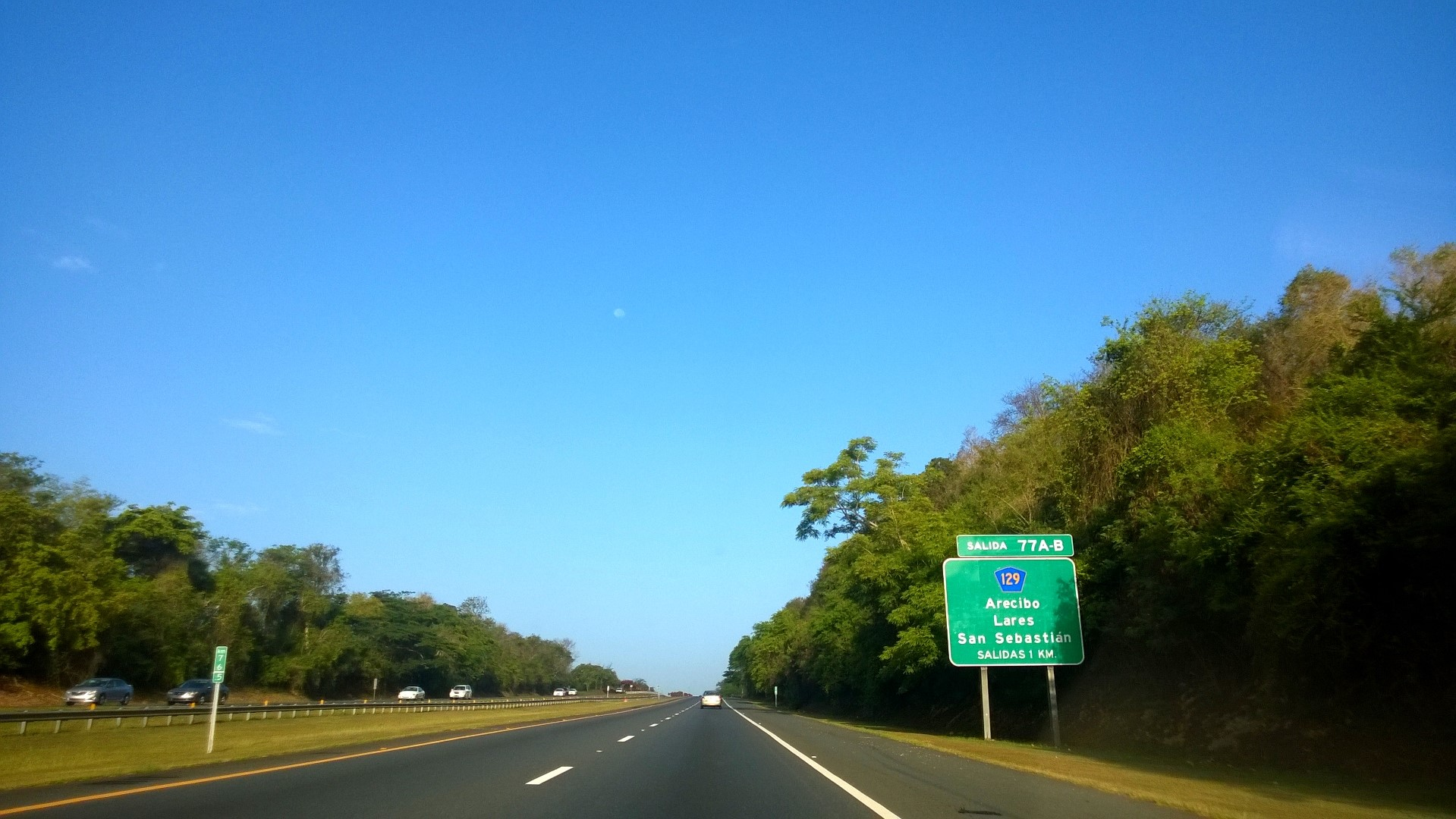
Heading west in Arecibo

The following is the list of municipalities/towns which PR-22 cuts through, in order from San Juan to Hatillo (westbound):

- San Juan
- Guaynabo
- Cataño
- Bayamón
- Toa Baja
- Dorado
- Vega Alta
- Vega Baja
- Manatí
- Barceloneta
- Arecibo
- Hatillo

=== Express lanes ===
In 2013, the Puerto Rico Highways and Transportation Authority and Metropistas inaugurated express lanes with dynamic tolling (DTL) between Bayamón and Toa Baja to help alleviate traffic congestion during peak hours. These reversible lanes extends from Río Hondo to the Toa Baja Toll Plaza with a variable rate between $1.75 and $4.95 per direction. The speed limit on the nearly 12-kilometer route ranges between 50 and 55 miles per hour (80-90 km/h). It is expected that in the long term the lanes will be extended near Vega Alta.

== History ==
Construction of this road began in 1969. The section from San Juan to Toa Baja opened in 1969 and in 1997 to Arecibo. Construction of the road was partially funded from appropriations of the U.S. Interstate Highway System.

=== Privatization ===
In 2011, the Autopistas Metropolitanas de Puerto Rico (Metropistas) consortium, comprised by Abertis Infraestructuras and Goldman Sachs Infrastructure Partners II LP, placed the winning bid for the 40-year PR-22 and PR-5 highway concession. The highways generate between $90 million and $95 million annually in toll revenue, which will now go to the private operators.

== Future ==
PR-22 is planned to be extended to Aguadilla. The extension will be built as part of a public–private partnership, who will maintain and operate PR-22 for the next 40 years.

== Services ==
=== Logo signs ===
In 2021, Metropistas began installing logo signs at exits advertising available food, gas, lodging, camping, and attractions available at exits via a contract with SunColors. As of January 2022 such signs have been installed at Exit 13 in Bayamón, and Exit 48 in Manatí.

== Tolls ==
PR-22 is maintained by a system of tolls managed by the Puerto Rico Department of Transportation and Public Works. All of its toll plazas have express lanes. After June 17, 2017, the seven tolls plaza of the PR-22 will become bidirectional.

Location	Toll	Direction	AutoExpreso acceptance	AutoExpreso replenishment (R) lane
Hatillo	$1.00	Two-way		(eastbound only)
Rampa Arecibo	$0.90	Westbound entrance (ramp)		
Arecibo	$1.40	Two-way		
Manatí	$1.40	Two-way		(westbound only)
Vega Alta	$1.00	Two-way		(eastbound only)
Toa Baja	$1.00	Two-way		(westbound only)
Buchanan	$1.00	Two-way		(eastbound only)

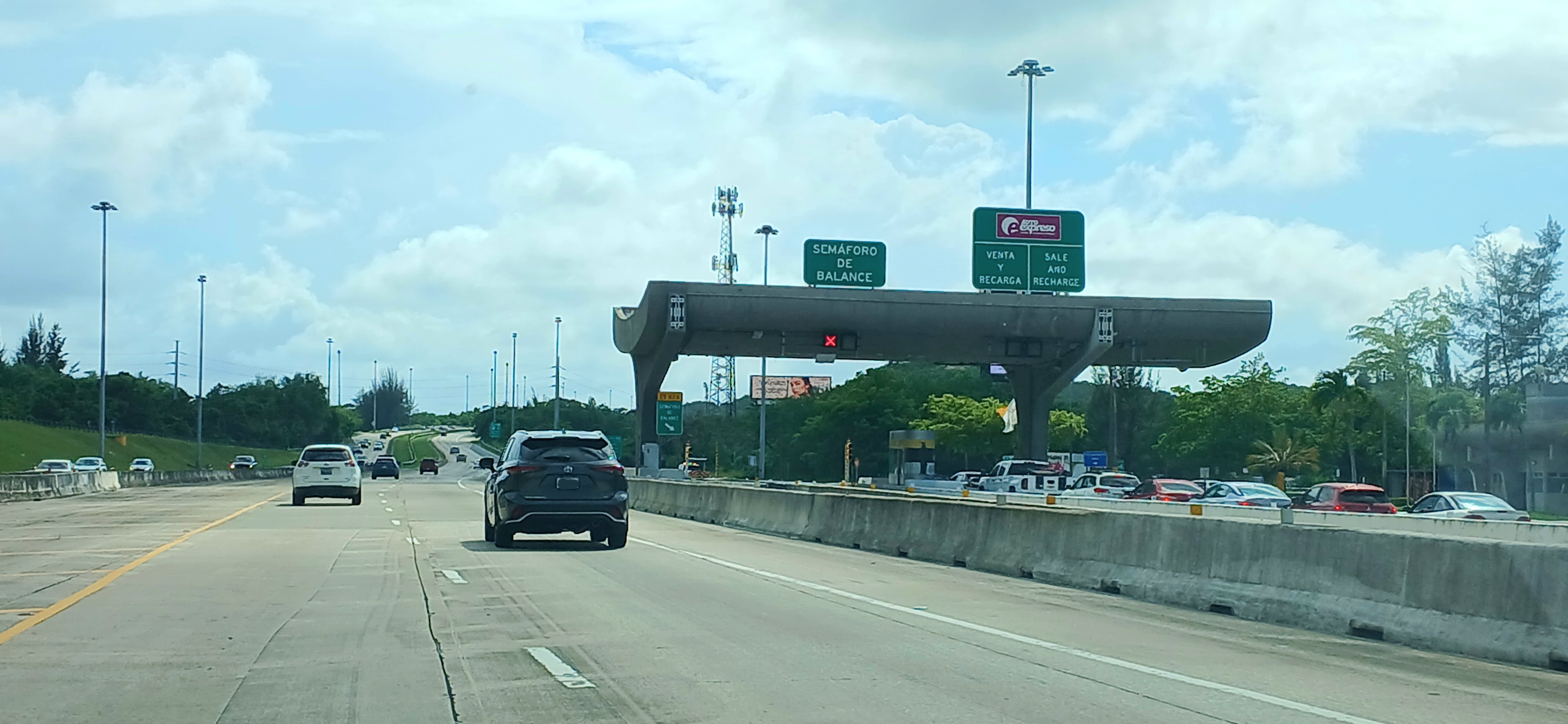
Manatí Toll Plaza

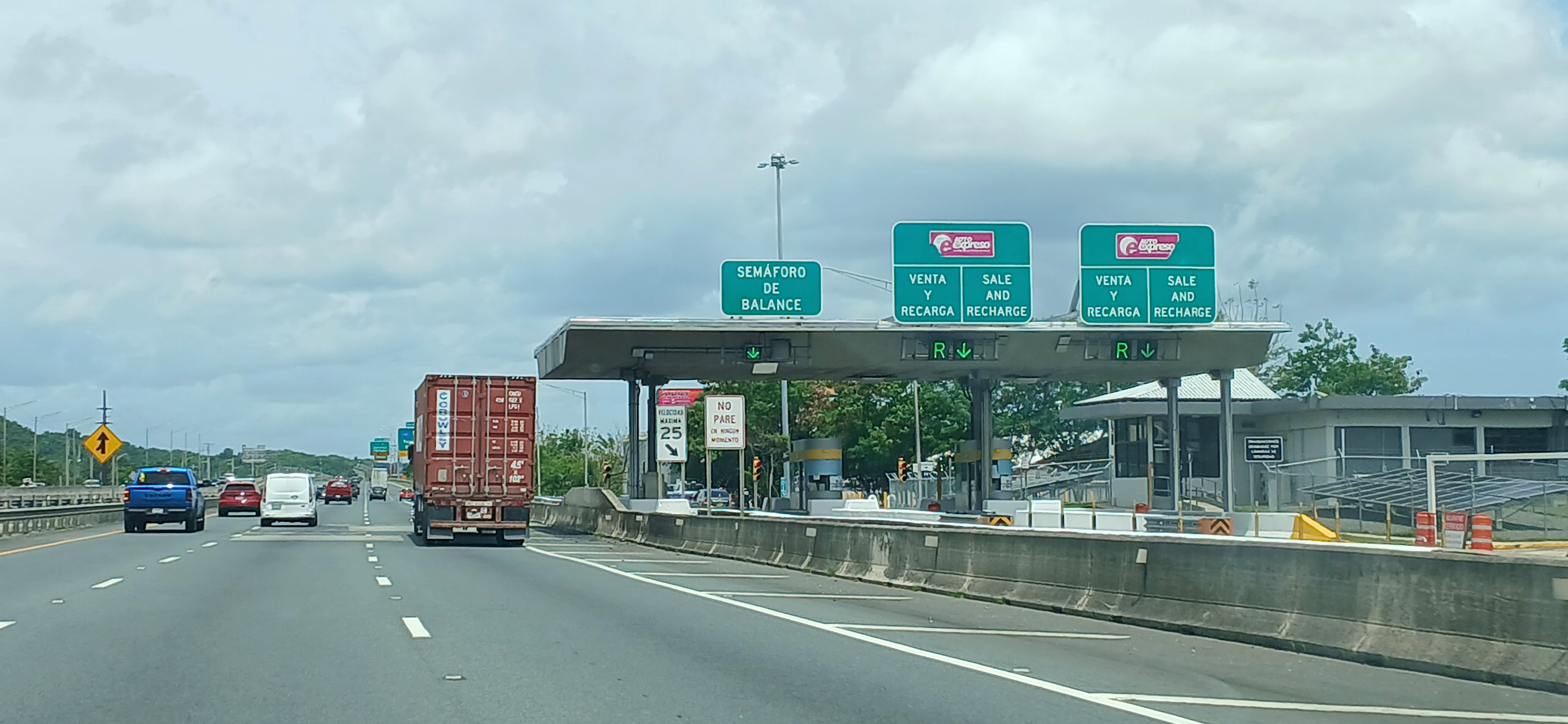
Toa Baja Toll Plaza

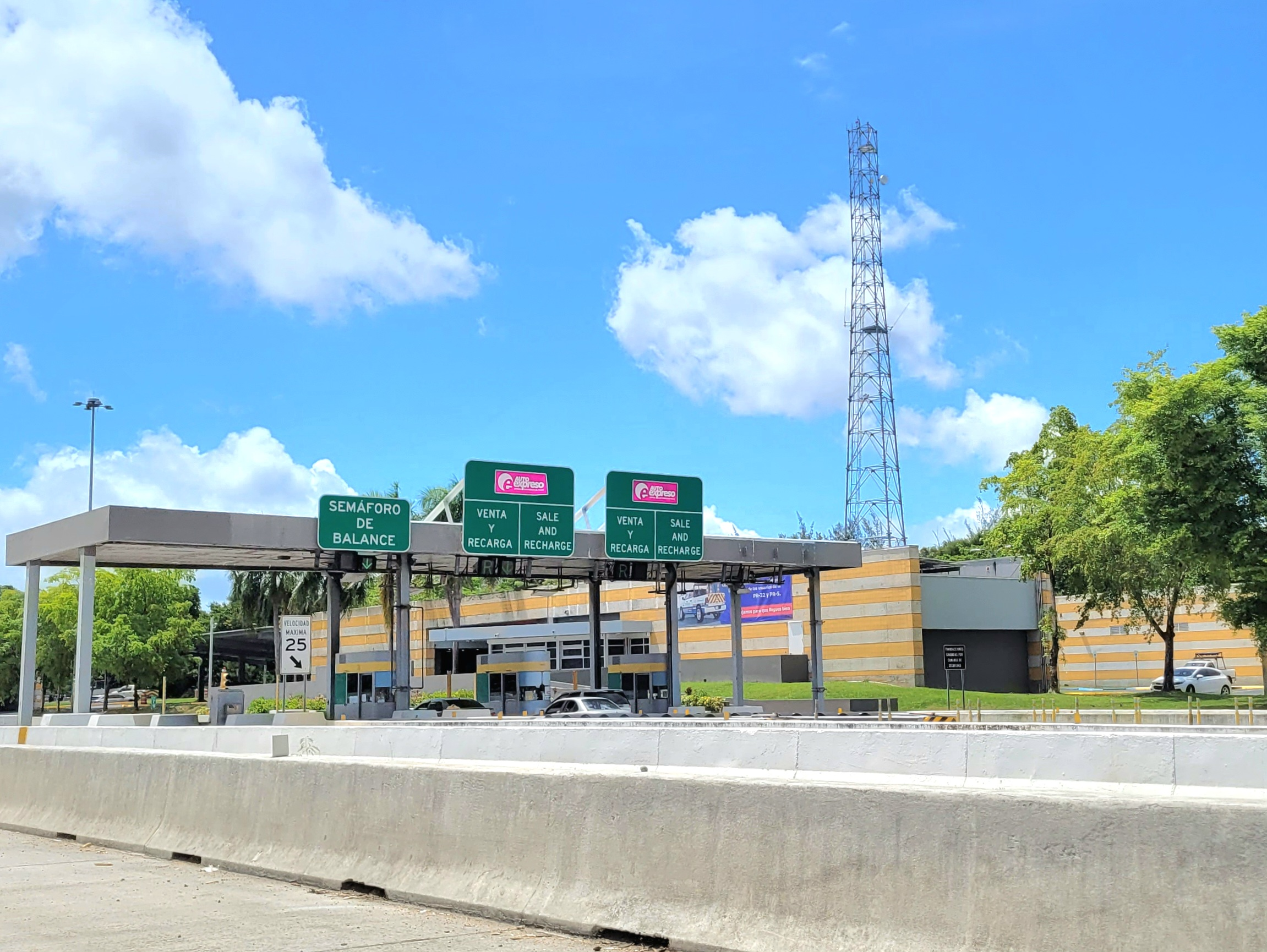
Buchanan Toll Plaza

Originally, PR-22 had only five toll plazas (Fort Buchanan, Toa Baja, Vega Alta, Factor ramp, and Hatillo); the Manatí and Arecibo toll plazas were added in the early 1990s.

The future segment from Hatillo to Aguadilla is expected to have four additional toll plazas; however, it remains to be seen whether they will be one way or two way.

As of 2014–2015, plans are underway to implement Open road tolling (ORT) and currently on many stretches of PR-22; Cash is no longer accepted to pay tolls with the exception of replenishing the toll tag.

On June 17, 2017 the new two-way collection rates came into effect by AutoExpreso in PR-22 and PR-5.

== Exit list ==
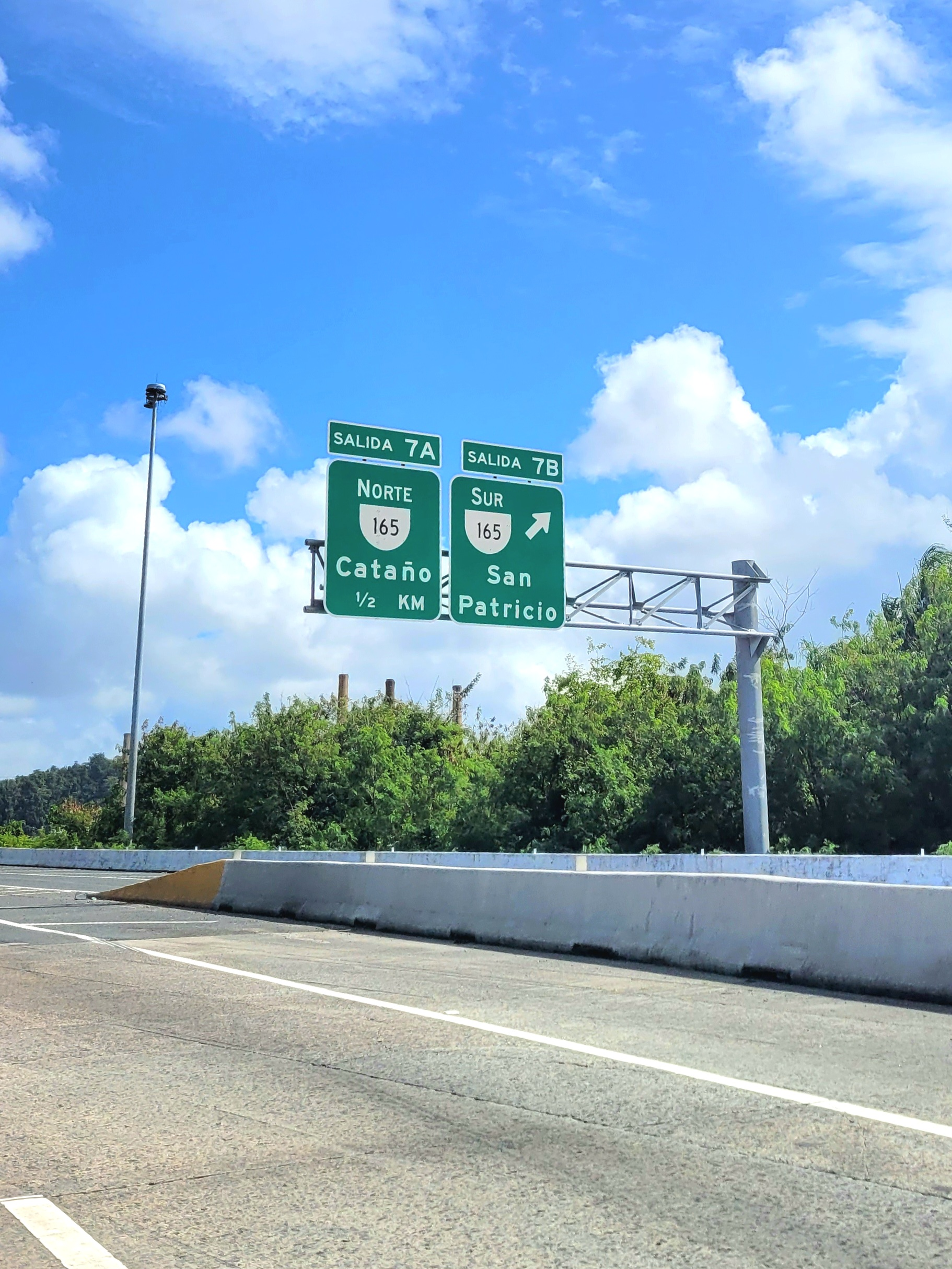
PR-22 east approaching exits 7A-B to PR-165 in Guaynabo

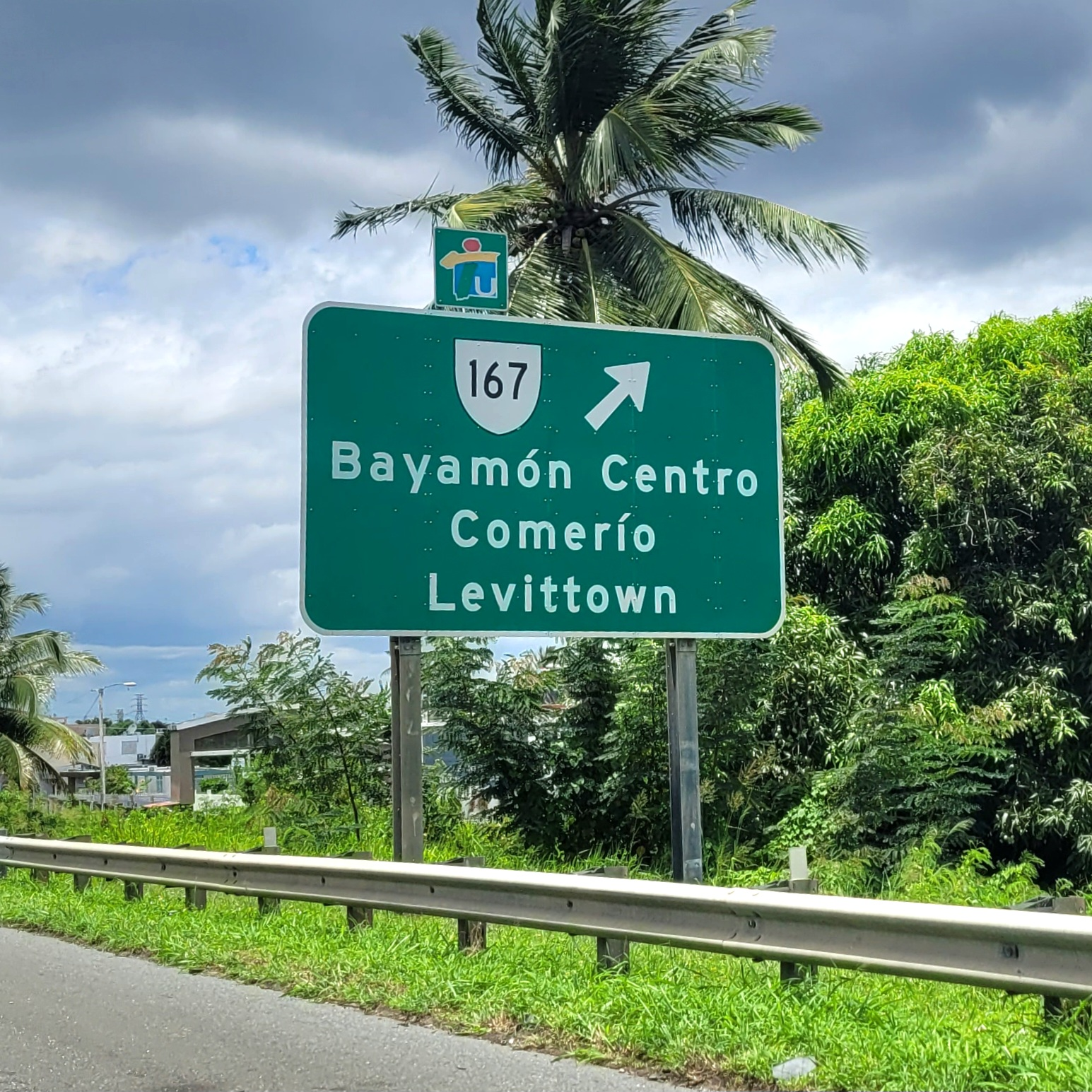
PR-22 east at exit 13 to PR-167 in Bayamón

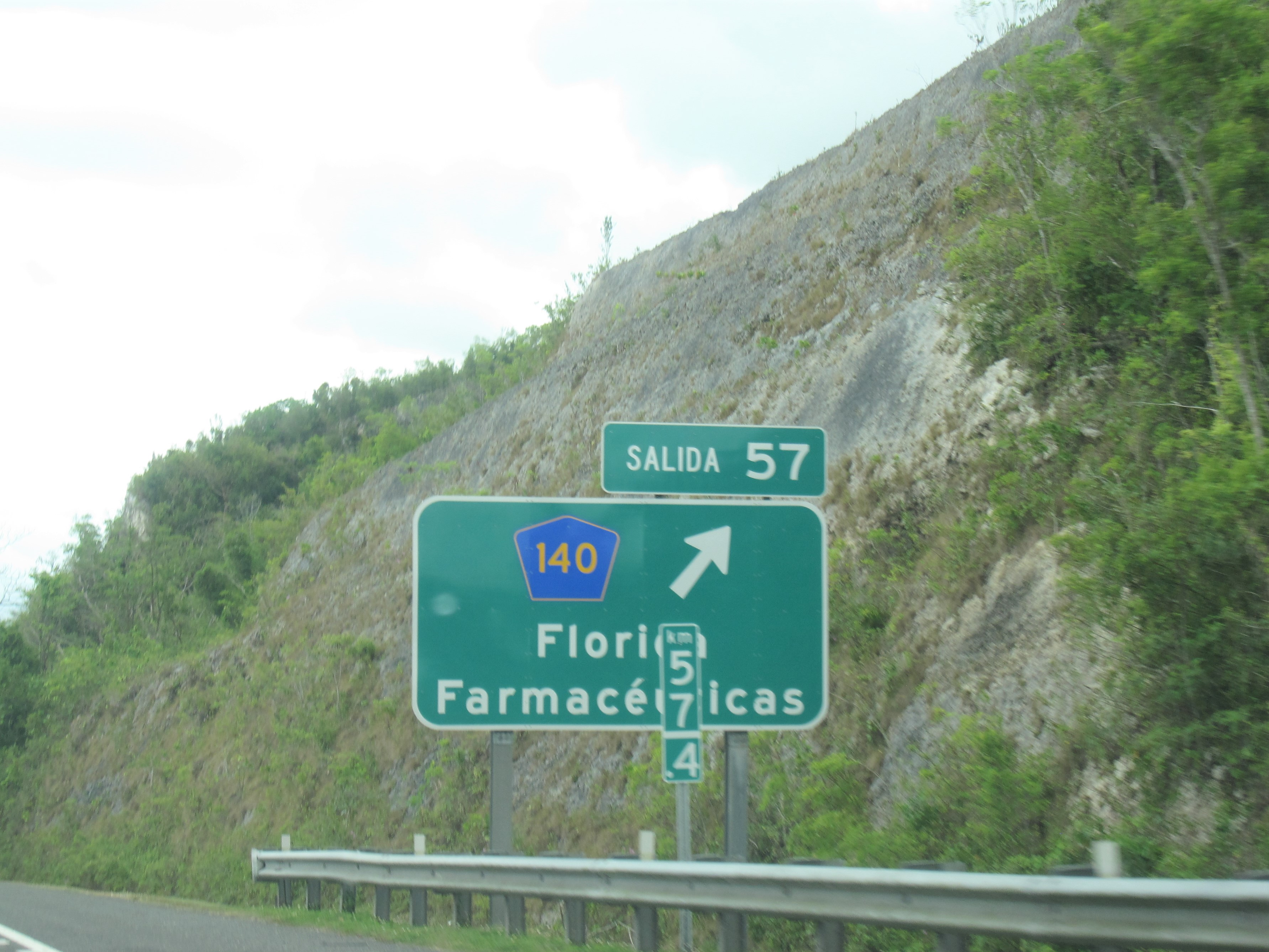
PR-22 east at exit 57 to PR-140 in Barceloneta

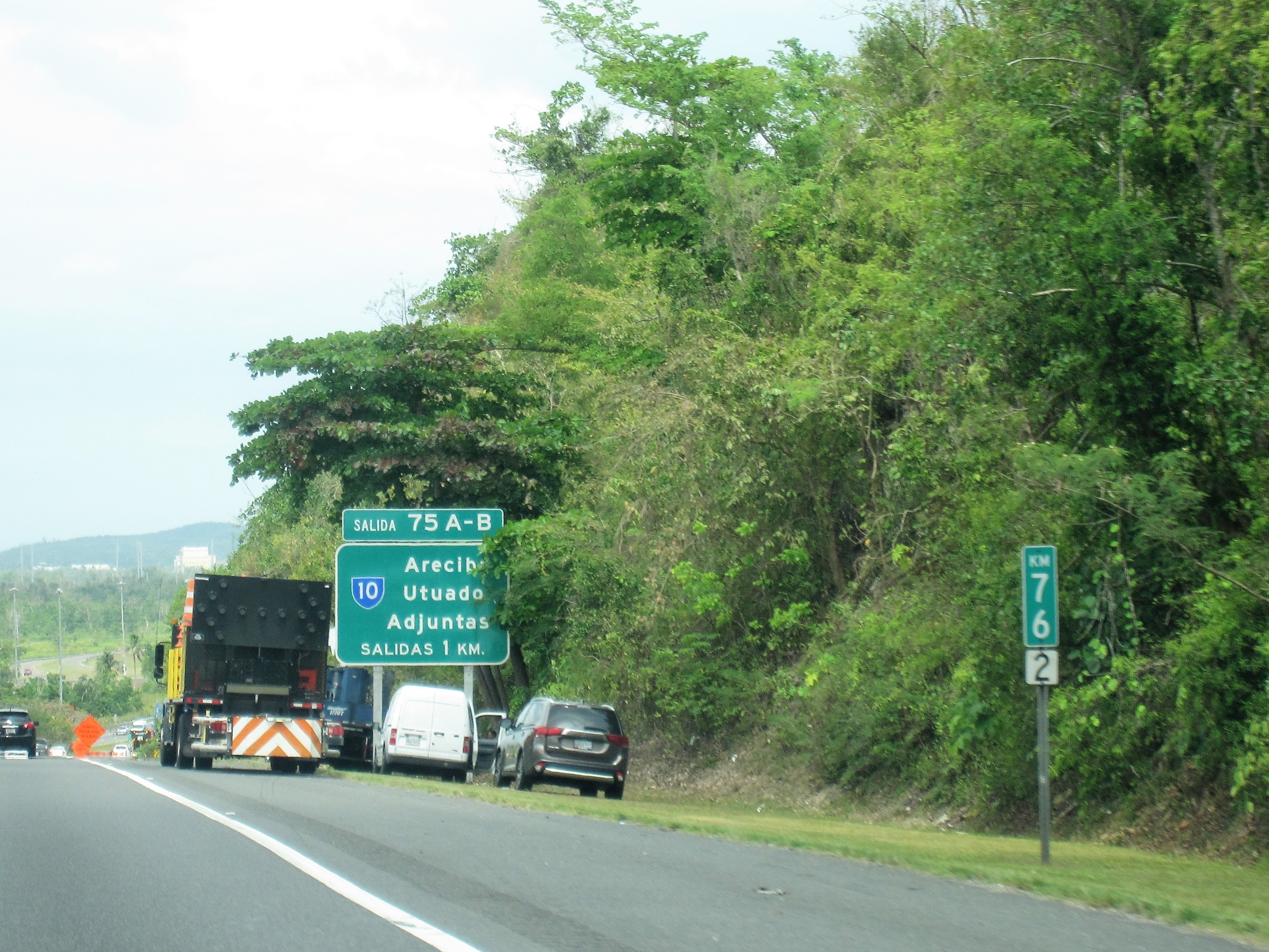
PR-22 east approaching exits 75A-B to PR-10 in Arecibo

Municipality	Location	km	mi	Exit	Destinations	Notes
Hatillo	Carrizales	84.3	52.4	84B	PR-2 west (PRI-2) – Hatillo, Aguadilla, Mayagüez	Western terminus of PR-22. Splits into PR-2; Interstate PR2 continues westbound via PR-2 as an At-grade traffic light expressway.
Hatillo	Carrizales	83.5	51.9	84A	PR-2 east – Arecibo	
Hatillo	Carrizales	82.2	51.1	Hatillo Toll Plaza		
Arecibo	Hato Abajo	78.0– 77.9	48.5– 48.4	77	PR-129 – Arecibo, Lares, San Sebastián	Signed as exits 77A (north) and 77B (south)
Arecibo	Tanamá	75.0– 74.9	46.6– 46.5	75	PR-10 – Arecibo, Utuado, Adjuntas	Signed as exits 75A (north) and 75B (south)
Arecibo	Domingo Ruíz	71.0	44.1	71	To PR-638 / PR-Avenida Músicos Arecibeños – Domingo Ruiz, Bajadero	Access to Antonio (Nery) Juarbe Pol Airport
Arecibo	Factor	64.9	40.3	64	PR-683 to PR-2 – Garrochales, Factor	ETC only; no AutoExpreso replenishment lane
Arecibo	Factor	64.2	39.9	Arecibo Toll Plaza (ETC only; no AutoExpreso replenishment lane)		
Barceloneta	Florida Afuera	56.9	35.4	57	PR-140 (Carretera Benito de Jesús Negrón) – Florida, Farmacéuticas	
Barceloneta	Florida Afuera	55.1	34.2	55	PR-140 (Carretera Benito de Jesús Negrón) – Barceloneta	
Río Grande de Manatí		55.1– 52.7	34.2– 32.7	Puente Juan Ramírez Vélez		
Manatí	Coto Norte	47.7	29.6	48	PR-149 south (Carretera Fernando "Nando" Otero Sánchez) – Manatí Centro, Ciales	
Manatí	Coto Norte	46.4– 46.3	28.8– 28.8	46	PR-686 (Carretera Leisha María Martínez Pagán) – Manati, Tierras Nuevas	Westbound exit and eastbound entrance
Manatí	Coto Norte	45.4	28.2	Manatí Toll Plaza		
Vega Baja	Algarrobo	41.7	25.9	42	PR-137 (Expreso Ángel "Tony" Laureano Martínez) to PR-2 – Morovis, Vega Baja	
Vega Baja	Pugnado Afuera	38.0	23.6	38	PR-Avenida Trío Vegabajeño – Vega Baja	Westbound exit and eastbound entrance
Vega Baja	Río Indio	37.1– 36.5	23.1– 22.7	Puente Paso del Indio		
Vega Baja	Almirante Norte	35.8	22.2	35	PR-160 – Almirante Norte	
Vega Alta	Bajura	32.9	20.4	32	PR-2 – Vega Alta, Vega Baja	
Vega Alta	Sabana	31.9	19.8	31	PR-690 – Cerro Gordo	Westbound exit only; no re-entry
Vega Alta	Sabana	31.4	19.5	Vega Alta Toll Plaza		
Dorado	Higuillar	27.5	17.1	27	PR-694 (Carretera Carmelo Mercado Adorno) to PR-695 (Carretera Pedro Barbosa Román) – Vega Alta, Maguayo, Higuillar	
Dorado	Maguayo	23.8	14.8	24	PR-659 / PR-693 (Avenida Édgar Martínez Salgado) – Dorado, Toa Alta	
Toa Baja	Media Luna	22.4– 22.3	13.9– 13.9	22	PR-165 – Toa Baja, Dorado, Toa Alta, Corozal	Westbound exits are signed as 22A (north) and 22B (south).
Toa Baja	Media Luna	21.8	13.5	Toa Baja Toll Plaza		
Toa Baja	Candelaria	17.4	10.8	17	PR-865 (Carretera Candelaria Arenas) to PR-866 – Campanilla, Candelaria	
Toa Baja	Sabana Seca	15.6	9.7	16	PR-866 – La Arena, Base Naval, Sabana Seca	
Bayamón	Hato Tejas	12.7	7.9	13	PR-167 (Avenida Ramón Luis Rivera) – Bayamón Centro, Comerío, Levittown	Access to Bayamón station
Bayamón–Cataño municipal line	Juan Sánchez–Palmas line	10.9	6.8	11	PR-869 (Carretera Industrial) – Palmas	
Bayamón–Cataño municipal line	Juan Sánchez–Palmas line	10.1	6.3	10	PR-5 south (Expreso Río Hondo) – Bayamón	Only westbound direction. This is a new version (freeway version) of original access exit (Exit 9).
Bayamón–Cataño municipal line	Juan Sánchez–Palmas line	9.7	6.0	9	PR-5 – Bayamón, Cataño	
Guaynabo	Pueblo Viejo	8.0	5.0	Buchanan Toll Plaza		
Guaynabo	Pueblo Viejo	6.9	4.3	7	PR-165 (Avenida El Caño) – Cataño, Zona Portuaria, Fort Buchanan, San Patricio	Exits signed 7A and 7B
Guaynabo	Pueblo Viejo	5.6	3.5	6	PR-2 (Expreso John F. Kennedy) – Caguas, Guaynabo, San Patricio, San Juan, Hato Rey, Santurce	Signed as Exits 6A and 6B. In westbound direction there is an exit (Exit 5) to PR-2 northbound after Exit 2B.
San Juan	Gobernador Piñero	4.6	2.9	5	PR-2 north (Expreso John F. Kennedy) / PR-Avenida José de Diego – Sector Bechara, Puerto Nuevo	PR-2 northbound is accessible from PR-22 westbound, and PR-2 southbound is accessible from Exit 6.
San Juan	Hato Rey Norte	3.0	1.9	3	PR-Avenida Roosevelt / PR-Calle Calaf – Plaza Las Américas	Eastbound exit signed as 2B.
San Juan	Hato Rey Norte	2.6	1.6	2A	PR-18 south (PRI-1 / Expreso Las Américas) – Río Piedras, Cupey, Caguas	
San Juan	Santurce	1.3– 1.2	0.81– 0.75	1	PR-1 to PR-2 south – San Juan, Bayamón, Guaynabo, Hato Rey, Santurce	Signed as Exits 1A and 1B.
San Juan	Santurce	0.9– 0.4	0.56– 0.25	0	PR-25 west (Avenida Juan Ponce de León) / PR-35 east (Avenida Manuel Fernández Juncos) / PR-37 (Avenida De Diego) – Santurce	Exits are signed as Exit 0A, Exit 0B, but Exit 0C in the tunnel are unsigned. These exits are only accessible in eastbound direction. Access to Pavía Santurce and Doctors' Center Hospital-San Juan.
San Juan	Santurce	0.0	0.0	—	PR-26 (PRI-3 / Expreso Román Baldorioty de Castro) – San Juan, Condado Centro, Santurce, Carolina, Airport, Isla Verde	Eastern terminus of Interstate PR2 and PR-22. Splits into PR-26 and Interstate PR3. PR-26 exit 2A
1.000 mi = 1.609 km; 1.000 km = 0.621 mi: Electronic toll collection; Incomplete access; Tolled; Route transition

== See also ==
- Interstate Highways in Puerto Rico
- José de Diego
