= Minillas Tunnel =

Tunnel located in San Juan, Puerto Rico

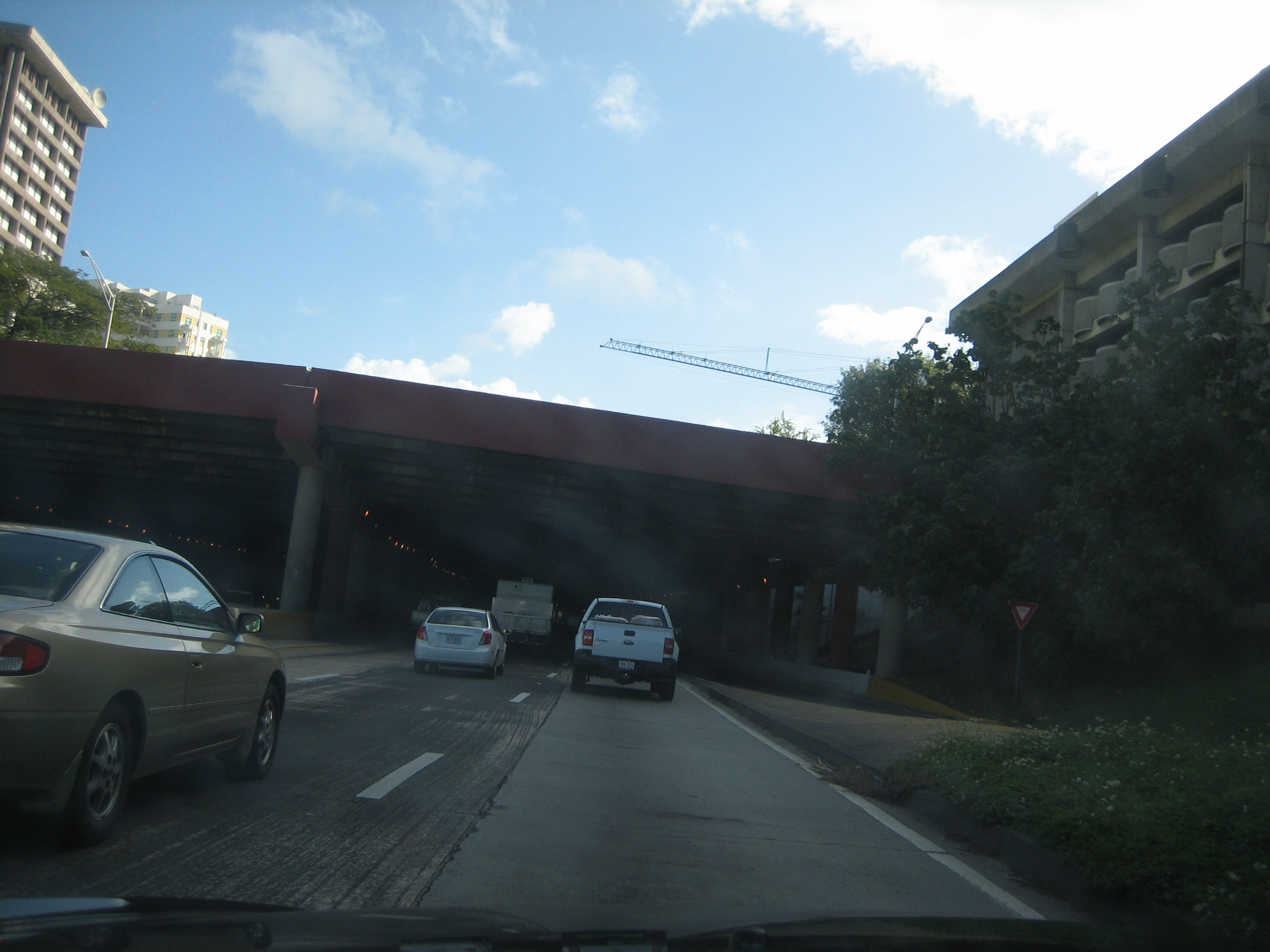
- The entrance of the Minillas Tunnel at the start of PR-22
- Interactive map of Minillas Tunnel

Overview
- Location: San Juan, Puerto Rico
- Route: Puerto Rico Highway 22 (unsigned Interstate PR2)

Operation
- Work began: 1978
- Opened: 1980
- Owner: Department of Transportation and Public Works of Puerto Rico

Technical
- Length: 396 m (1,299 ft)
- No. of lanes: six

The Minillas Tunnel is a road tunnel located in San Juan, Puerto Rico. It starts at the beginning of Puerto Rico Highway 22 (unsigned Interstate PR-2), in the vicinity of Santurce, near Condado. The tunnel is 396 m (1,299 ft) long, and carries six lanes, three in each direction. The tunnel was constructed from 1978 through 1980. In 2012, it carried an annual average daily traffic of 211,700 vehicles/day.

== See also ==
- Minillas
