= Outfront Media =

American outdoor advertising company

Outfront Media, Inc.
- Type: Public
- Traded as: NYSE: OUT; Russell 1000 Component; S&P 600 Component
- Industry: Real estate investment trust, outdoor advertising
- Founded: 1938; 88 years ago
- Headquarters: Chrysler Building, New York, NY, U.S.
- Area served: Americas
- Key people: Nick Brien (CEO); Matthew Siegel (CFO)
- Products: Billboards, transit advertising
- Revenue: ▲US$ 2.5B (2020)
- Number of employees: 2,370 (2020)
- Website: outfront.com

Outfront Media, Inc. (stylized as OUTFRONT/) is an American advertising company which operates billboards, logo signs, and transit displays and focused on outdoor advertising. It operates in the United States. The Americas division is led by chief executive officer Nick Brien. Outfront Media has both billboards and transit displays.

== History ==
Logo used from 2001–2006

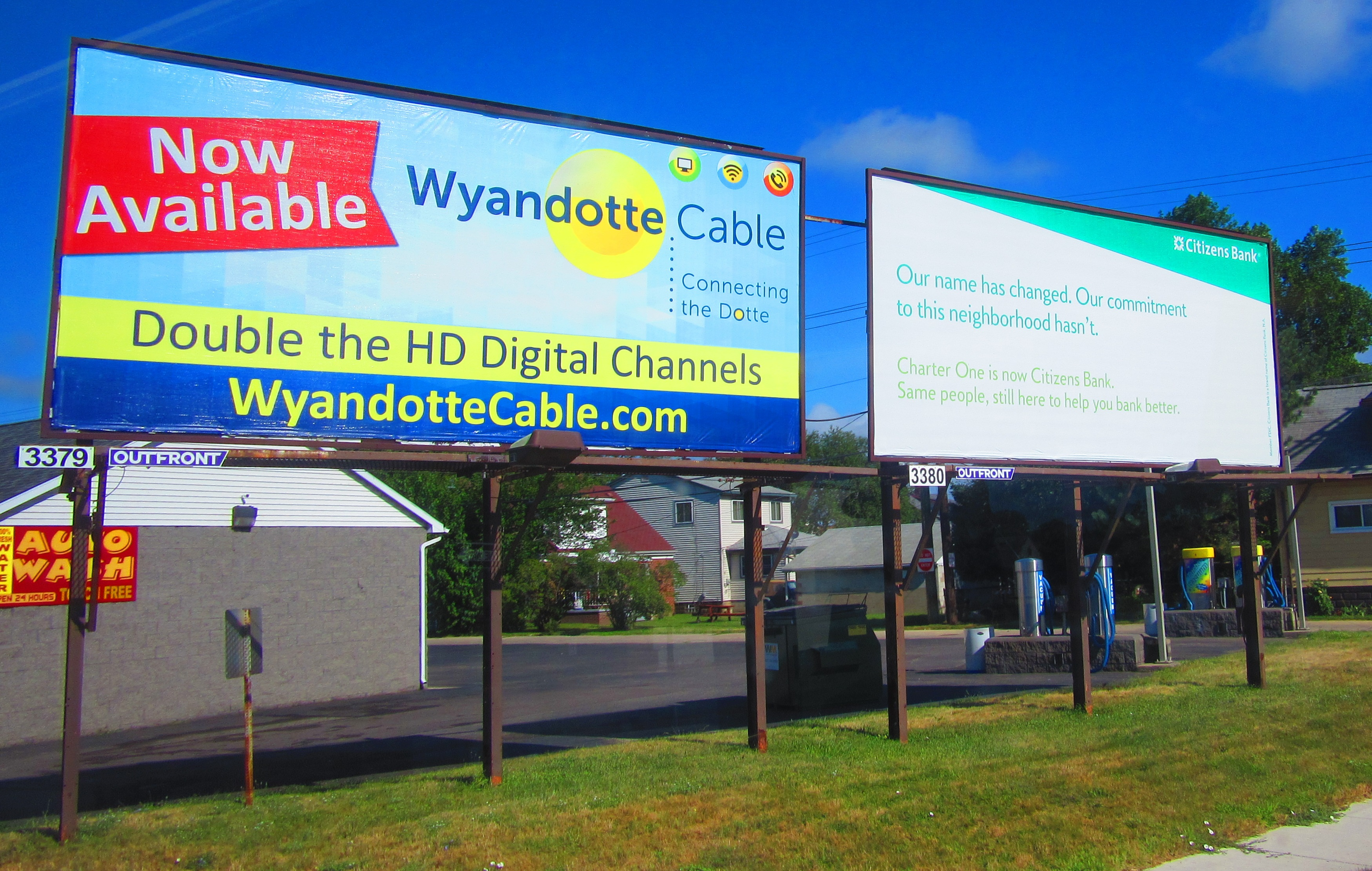
Outfront Media billboards in Wyandotte, Michigan, advertising Wyandotte Municipal Services's cable television service and Citizens Bank

TDI (Transportation Displays Incorporated) was the first predecessor company for transit advertising, publishing advertising for passenger railroad timetables and displays in railroad terminals. TDI was first incorporated in 1938. TDI was sold to IT&T in the early 1970s and then to the Winston Network in the early 1980s, it was later renamed TDI in 1989 led by Bill Apfelbaum. In 1996 the company was sold to Infinity Broadcasting. The transit business and the billboard business merged in 2001 under the name Viacom Outdoor.

Logo used from 2006–2014

The billboard division was originally two separate companies: National Advertising Company (also known as 3M National or National 3M), the outdoor advertising subsidiary of 3M; and Gannett Outdoor, owned by the Gannett Company. In August 1996, Gannett exited the billboard business by selling its outdoor division to Phoenix, Arizona-based Outdoor Systems Advertising. OSI would later acquire 3M National in May 1997, but before that sale was finalized, the United States Justice Department ruled that Outdoor Systems had to sell nearly all of its 3M billboards in ten U.S. cities (all 3M billboards in Phoenix, Arizona; Sacramento, California; New Orleans; Louisville, Kentucky; Denver; Detroit; Kansas City, Missouri and Grand Rapids, Michigan; plus almost all 3M billboards in Atlanta and half of 3M's billboards in Houston) where both Outdoor Systems (OSI) and 3M National already had billboards to Lamar Advertising Company to avoid a monopoly in these cities.

On December 7, 1999, Outdoor Systems (OSI) was bought by Infinity and became Infinity Outdoor. Infinity was absorbed into Viacom in 2001, and became Viacom Outdoor. When Viacom split from CBS Corporation in December 2005, it became CBS Outdoor. CBS owned CBS Outdoor as a division of CBS until March 2014, at which point it was spun off into an independent company. CBS Corporation continued to own 83% of Outfront Media, although this number is expected to decline over time as Outfront Media converts into a real estate investment trust and CBS Corporation divests itself of the outdoor unit. CBS Outdoor shares began trading on the New York Stock Exchange on March 28, 2014. In July 2014, it was announced that CBS Outdoor would acquire the billboard business of Van Wagner Communications for $690 million.

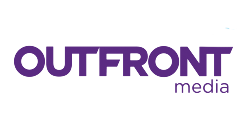
Logo used from 2014–2018 (still used on most American billboards to this day, and on Canadian billboards until 2024)

As of July 17, 2014, CBS Outdoor became a fully independent corporation, operating as a real estate investment trust. The company announced it would rename itself as Outfront Media, Inc., effective November 20, 2014. The company's ticker symbol on the NYSE changed from CBSO to OUT. A rebranding program converted billboards, signage and displays from CBS Outdoor to Outfront logos. In October 2015, Outfront Media refused to post New York City Subway ads involving Thinx underwear for women, on the basis that the word "period" was used in the advertisement copy and was accompanied by images of grapefruits.

In September 2018 ‘Today, I’m Brave,’ based in Los Angeles and the non-profit part of creative agency David&Goliath, put together a fundraising initiative with the purpose of aiding Puerto Rico's recovery from Hurricane Maria. As part of this effort, Outfront donated a billboard that went up on the first anniversary of Hurricane Maria and Hurricane Irma to commemorate and raise funds for hurricane victims. In October 2018, an 18-member coalition of Chicago Southland churches, synagogues and mosques spread the message "One God, Three Faiths" using Outfront billboards. In a CNBC interview, Outfront Media CEO Jeremy Male said that out-of-home media is a popular medium among top tech and consumer companies, and is a growing advertising medium.

== Worldwide ==
=== United States ===
Outfront Media holds advertising contracts including:

- MTA New York City Transit (NYCT) bus and subway, Metro-North Railroad, Long Island Rail Road (these were previously under Titan Outdoor from 2007–2010), New York City
- Washington Metropolitan Area Transit Authority (WMATA), Washington, D.C.
- Los Angeles County Metropolitan Transportation Authority (LACMTA), Los Angeles
- Metropolitan Atlanta Rapid Transit Authority (MARTA), Atlanta
- Valley Metro Regional Public Transportation Authority of greater Phoenix, Arizona, transit shelters and light rail (Valley Metro)
- Detroit Department of Transportation, Suburban Mobility Authority for Regional Transportation and Ann Arbor Area Transportation Authority in Metro Detroit
- Potomac and Rappahannock Transportation Commission (PRTC), Prince William County, Virginia
- Santa Clara Valley Transportation Authority (VTA), Santa Clara County, California, Silicon Valley

=== Canada ===
Outfront Media Canada (Outfront Média in Quebec) was an outdoor representative in Canada. On October 23, 2023, Bell Media signed a deal to buy Outfront Media's Canadian division for $410 million. The deal closed in 2024, when all billboards defaulted to Astral Out of Home. Major products/contracts include:

- Transit shelter contracts in the municipalities of Halifax, Cape Breton, Saint John, Quebec City, Saguenay, Trois-Rivières, Sherbrooke, Montreal, Oakville, Mississauga, Vaughan, Richmond Hill, Markham, Pickering, Newmarket, Hamilton, London, Windsor, Leamington, Sarnia, Barrie, Winnipeg, Calgary, Edmonton, and Vancouver
- In addition Outfront Media Canada represents products including billboards, murals and large format products like Superboards in the top markets across the country.

Outfront Media products are audited and measured by COMB (the Canadian Out-of-Home Measurement Bureau).

== Past names ==
- National Advertising Company (3M National or National 3M)
- Whiteco
- Gannett Outdoor
- Outdoor Systems (OSI)
- Infinity Outdoor
- Viacom Outdoor
- CBS Outdoor
- Outfront Media (Canada)
- Transportation Displays, Inc. (TDI)
- Outedge (Sold to Bell Media)
- Astral Out of Home (acquired by Bell Media in 2013)

== See also ==
- Billboard advertising
- Digital billboard
- Clear Channel Outdoor
- Lamar Advertising Company
