= Metropistas =

Partnership operating some Puerto Rico highways

- Type: privately held company
- Industry: transportation
- Genre: toll road
- Founded: May 19, 2011; 15 years ago
- Headquarters: Guaynabo, Puerto Rico
- Area served: San Juan–Caguas–Guaynabo metropolitan area
- Key people: Gonzalo Alcalde, CEO
- Services: operates PR-5, PR-20, PR-22, PR-52, PR-53, PR-66, and Teodoro Moscoso Bridge
- Revenue: ▲$89.1 million USD
- Owners: Goldman Sachs; Abertis
- Website: www.metropistas.com

Autopistas Metropolitanas de Puerto Rico, LLC English: Puerto Rico Metropolitan Expressways —stylized as metropistas English: Metro Expressways— is the public–private partnership, privately held company, and limited liability company that operates PR-5, PR-20, PR-22, PR-52, PR-53, PR-66, and Teodoro Moscoso Bridge on behalf of the Puerto Rico Highways and Transportation Authority. The company is a consortium between Goldman Sachs and Abertis where Goldman Sachs initially served as majority owner through its Goldman Sachs Infrastructure Partners II infrastructure fund, while Abertis initially served as minority partner and main operator. However, in February 2013 Abertis acquired 6% of Goldman Sach's equity, elevating its position as majority owner with 51% ownership. (Note: EFE (2014; in Spanish) "Abertis compró a dos fondos de inversión gestionados por Goldman Sachs el 6% de Autopistas Metropolitanas de Puerto Rico (Metropistas) por $43.6 millones, con lo que su participación en dicha sociedad se eleva al 51%.")

In late 2018 it was given a BBB rating by Kroll Bond Rating Agency (KBRA) and has a Concession Agreement with the Puerto Rico Highway Transportation Authority for Puerto Rico Highway 5 and Puerto Rico Highway 22.

== See also ==
- List of highways in Puerto Rico
