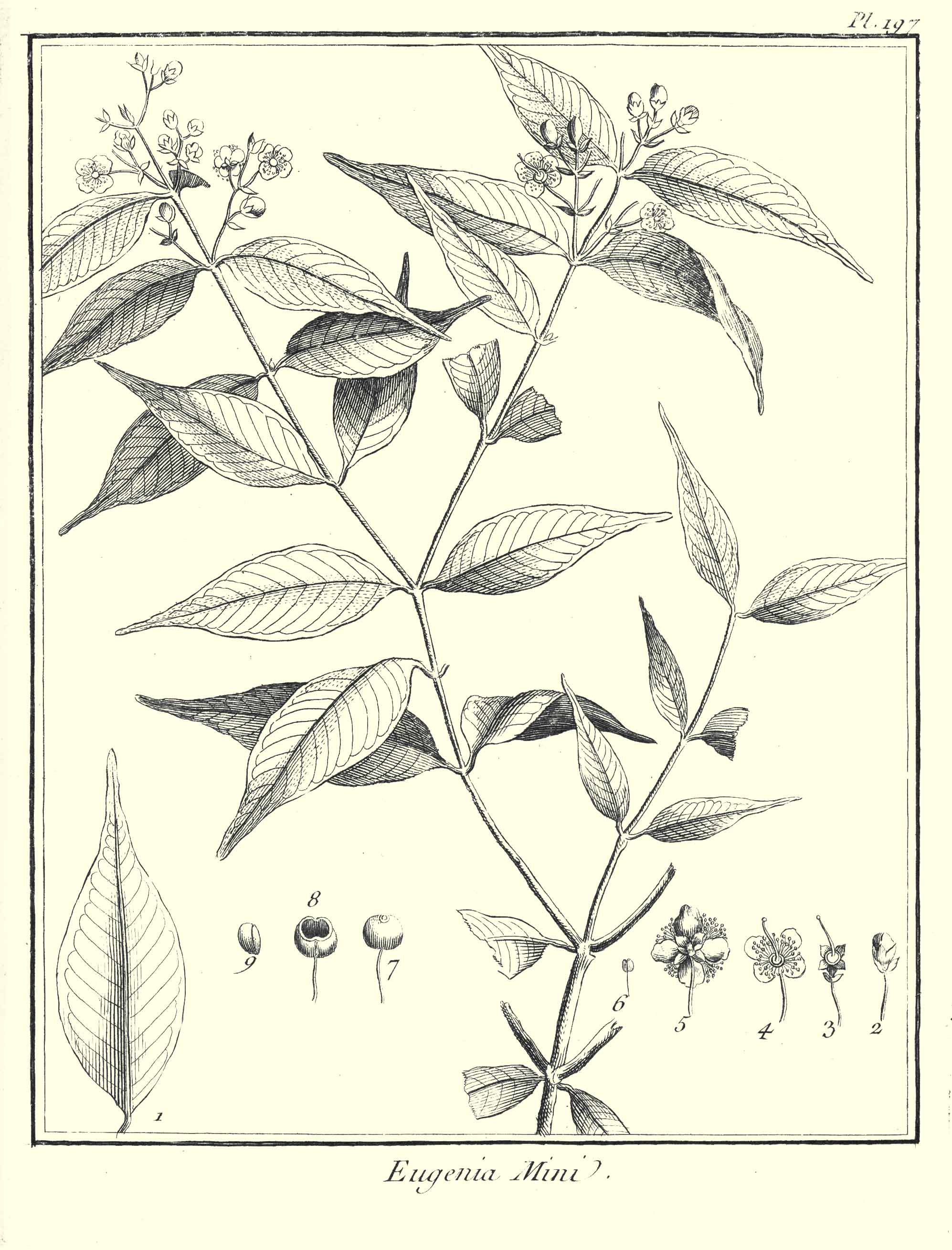
- Eugenia biflora (as synonym E. mini Aubl.)

Conservation status
- Least Concern (IUCN 3.1)

Scientific classification
- Kingdom: Plantae
- Clade: Embryophytes
- Clade: Tracheophytes
- Clade: Angiosperms
- Clade: Eudicots
- Clade: Rosids
- Order: Myrtales
- Family: Myrtaceae
- Genus: Eugenia
- Species: E. biflora

Binomial name
- Eugenia biflora (L.) DC.

Synonyms
- Synonymy: Caryophyllus fruticosus Mill.; Cumetea mini (Aubl.) Raf.; Eugenia acuminatissima O.Berg; Eugenia acutiloba DC.; Eugenia alexandri Krug & Urb.; Eugenia alfaroana Standl.; Eugenia amanuensis Steyerm.; Eugenia australis Colla; Eugenia berteroana (Spreng.) DC.; Eugenia biflora var. hoffmannseggii (O.Berg) Amshoff; Eugenia biflora var. lancea (Poir.) Krug & Urb.; Eugenia biflora var. ludibunda (Bertero ex DC.) Krug & Urb.; Eugenia biflora var. mini (Aubl.) Amshoff; Eugenia biflora var. myriostigma (Sagot) Amshoff; Eugenia biflora var. pallens (Vahl) Krug & Urb.; Eugenia biflora var. virgultosa (Sw.) Krug & Urb.; Eugenia brachythrix Urb.; Eugenia caurensis Steyerm.; Eugenia fieldingii O.Berg; Eugenia freireana O.Berg; Eugenia freireana var. angustifolia O.Berg; Eugenia freireana var. latifolia O.Berg; Eugenia hartii Kiaersk.; Eugenia hoffmannseggii O.Berg; Eugenia hoffmannseggii var. grandifolia O.Berg; Eugenia hoffmannseggii var. parvifolia O.Berg; Eugenia inundata var. acutifolia O.Berg; Eugenia jamaicana Mattos; Eugenia jamaicensis O.Berg; Eugenia lancea Poir.; Eugenia leptophlebia Diels; Eugenia loretensis Diels; Eugenia ludibunda Bertero ex DC.; Eugenia macarensis O.Berg; Eugenia meyeriana O.Berg; Eugenia meyeriana var. depauperata O.Berg; Eugenia meyeriana var. dives O.Berg; Eugenia microcarpos Lam.; Eugenia microcarpos var. mini (Aubl.) Lam.; Eugenia mini Aubl.; Eugenia mini var. microcarpos (Lam.) Pers.; Eugenia modesta var. jamaicensis O.Berg; Eugenia myriostigma Sagot; Eugenia nicholsii Fawc. & Rendle; Eugenia pallens (Vahl) DC.; Eugenia racemosa DC.; Eugenia richardiana O.Berg; Eugenia salicifolia O.Berg; Eugenia sericiflora Benth.; Eugenia virgata Macfad.; Eugenia virgultosa (Sw.) DC.; Eugenia virgultosa var. jamaicensis (O.Berg) Proctor; Eugenia xylopifolia DC.; Eugenia xylopifolia var. brevipes O.Berg; Myrcia erythroxylon var. virescens O.Berg; Myrcia mini (Aubl.) Sweet; Myrcia schomburgkiana O.Berg; Myrcia splendens var. mini (Aubl.) DC.; Myrtus berteroana Spreng.; Myrtus biflora L. (1759) (basionym); Myrtus biflora var. salicifolia Kuntze; Myrtus biflora f. subsericea Kuntze; Myrtus biflora var. yapacani Kuntze; Myrtus lancea (Poir.) Spreng.; Myrtus mini (Aubl.) Spreng.; Myrtus pallens Vahl; Myrtus virgultosa Sw.

= Eugenia biflora =

Species of flowering plant

Eugenia biflora is a species of flowering plant in the family Myrtaceae. It is a shrub or tree native to the tropical Americas, ranging from southeastern Mexico through Central and South America to Bolivia and central Brazil, including Hispaniola, Jamaica, Puerto Rico, and the Cayman, Leeward, and Windward Islands in the Caribbean. It grows in lowland tropical moist forests.

The species has a wide distribution and large population, and is not subject to any major threats. The IUCN Red List assesses it as Least Concern.

The species was first described as Myrtus biflora by Carl Linnaeus in 1759. In 1828 Augustin Pyramus de Candolle placed it in genus Eugenia as E. biflora.
