= Garrochales, Arecibo, Puerto Rico =

Barrio of Puerto Rico

Garrochales
- Barrio
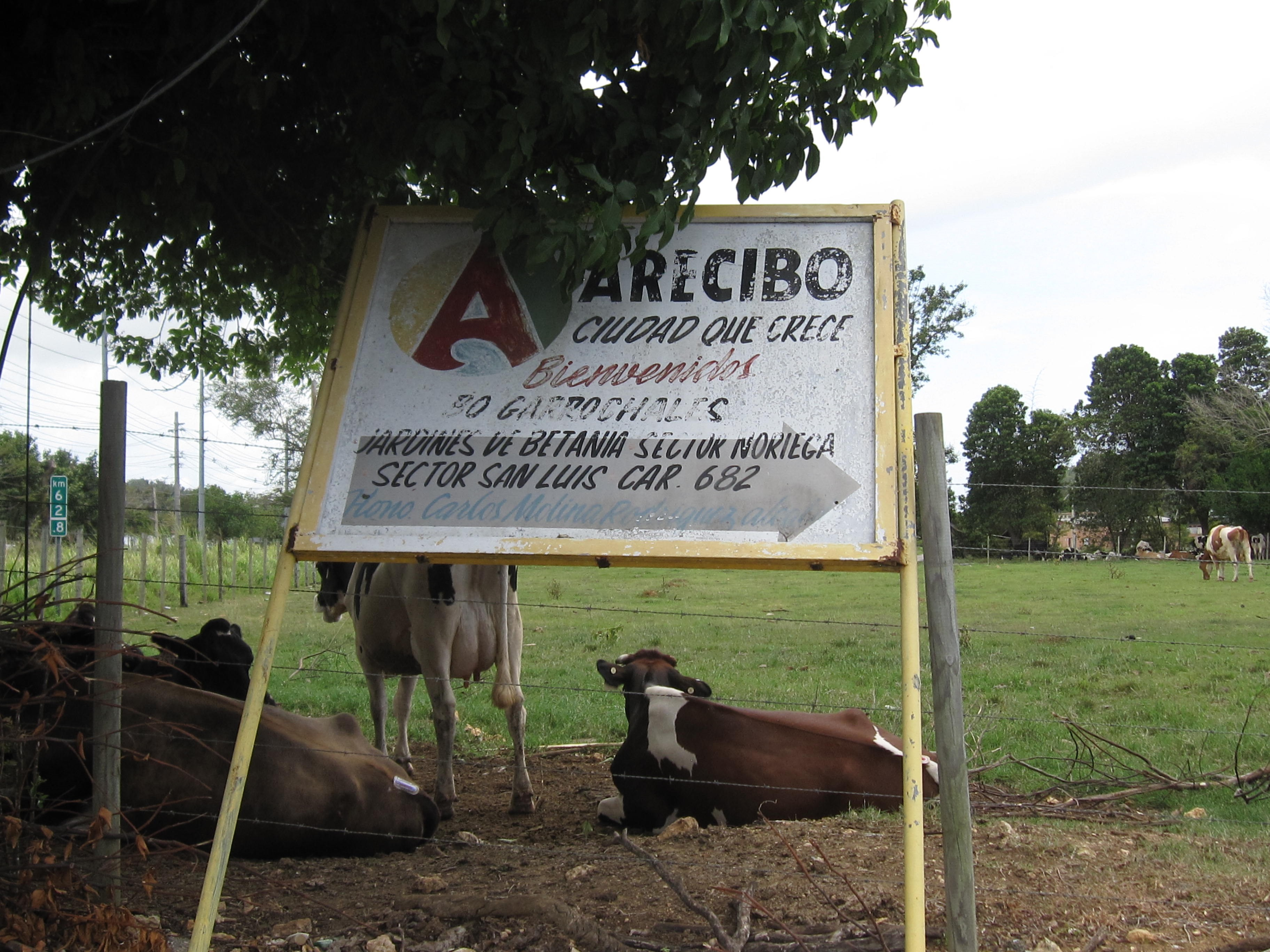
- Cows (dairy is a mainstay industry of Arecibo and nearby Hatillo)

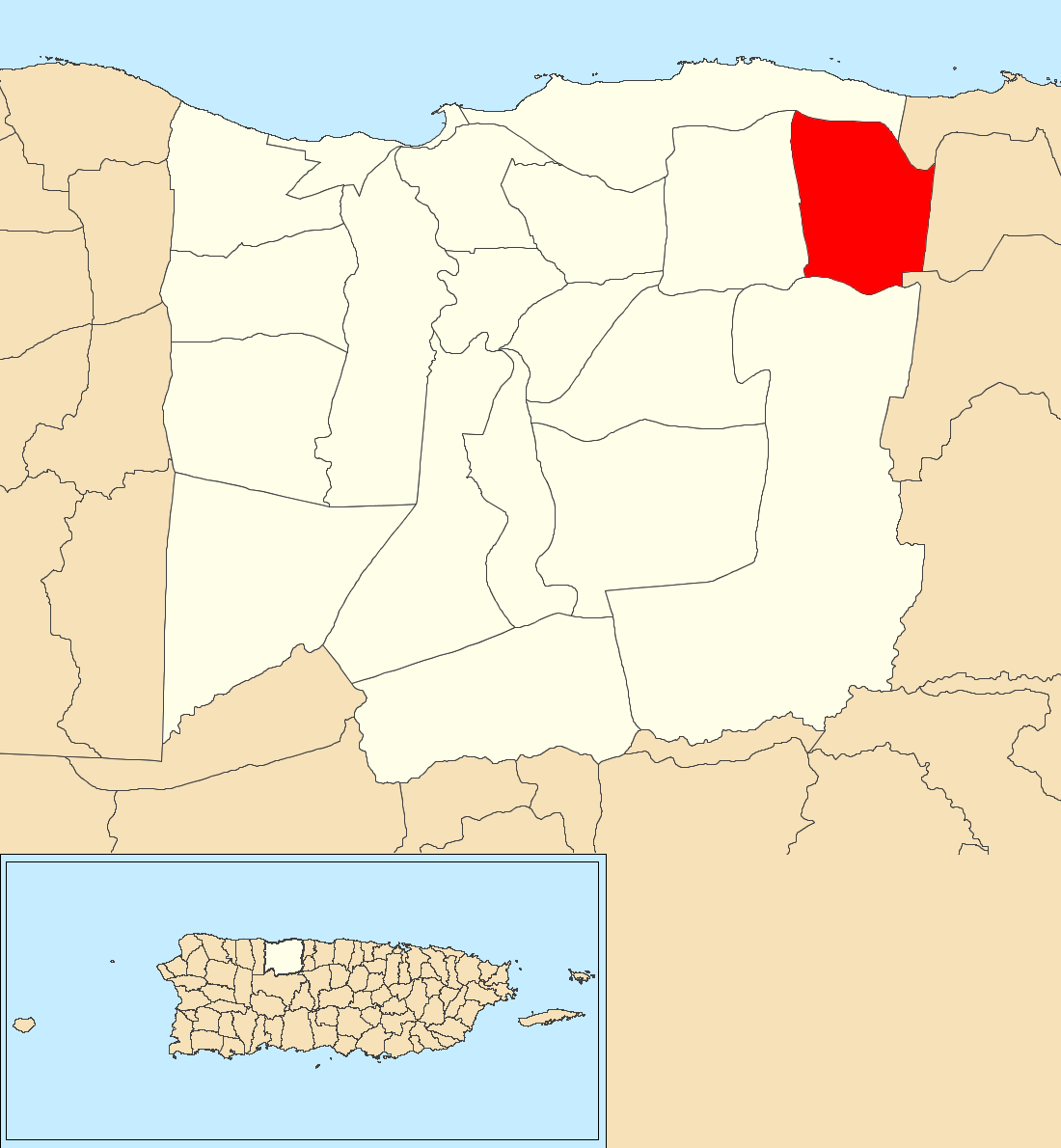
- Location of Garrochales within the municipality of Arecibo shown in red

- Location of Puerto Rico
- Coordinates: 18°27′36″N 66°35′44″W
- Commonwealth: Puerto Rico
- Municipality: Arecibo

Area
  - Total: 5.34 sq mi (13.8 km^{2})
  - Land: 5.32 sq mi (13.8 km^{2})
  - Water: 0.02 sq mi (0.052 km^{2})
- Elevation: 85 ft (26 m)

Population (2010)
  - Total: 2,433
  - Density: 457.3/sq mi (176.6/km^{2})
- Source: 2010 Census
- Time zone: UTC−4 (AST)

Garrochales is a barrio located in the northeastern area of the municipality of Arecibo, Puerto Rico. Its population in 2010 was 2,433.

== Features and sectors ==
Garrochales's borders are Islote barrio and Barceloneta municipality on its north; Barceloneta on its east; Sabana Hoyos barrio on its south; and Factor barrio on its west.

Barrios (which are like minor civil divisions) in turn are further subdivided into smaller local populated place areas/units called sectores (sectors in English). The types of sectores may vary, from normally sector to urbanización to reparto to barriada to residencial, among others.

The following sectors are in Garrochales barrio:

Comunidad San Luis, Sector Bethania, Sector Bosque Cambalache, Sector El Alto, Sector El Salao, Sector Factor II, Sector La PRRA, Sector Noriega, Sector Sabana, Sector Salao, Sector San Luis, Urbanización Haciendas de Garrochales, Urbanización Jardines de Bethania, and Urbanización Villas de Garrochales.

== History and demographics ==
Garrochales was in Spain's gazetteers until Puerto Rico was ceded by Spain in the aftermath of the Spanish–American War under the terms of the Treaty of Paris of 1898 and became an unincorporated territory of the United States. In 1899, the United States Department of War conducted a census of Puerto Rico finding that the population of Garrochales barrio was 950.

Historical population
| Census | Pop. | Note | %± |
|---|---|---|---|
| 1900 | 950 | | — |
| 1910 | 1,338 | | 40.8% |
| 1920 | 979 | | −26.8% |
| 1930 | 1,421 | | 45.1% |
| 1940 | 1,580 | | 11.2% |
| 1950 | 1,585 | | 0.3% |
| 1960 | 1,297 | | −18.2% |
| 1970 | 1,714 | | 32.2% |
| 1980 | 1,965 | | 14.6% |
| 1990 | 2,176 | | 10.7% |
| 2000 | 2,366 | | 8.7% |
| 2010 | 2,433 | | 2.8% |
U.S. Decennial Census; 1899 (shown as 1900) 1910-1930; 1930-1950 1980-2000 2010

The industry of Garrochales is cattle farming and dairy.

== Gallery ==
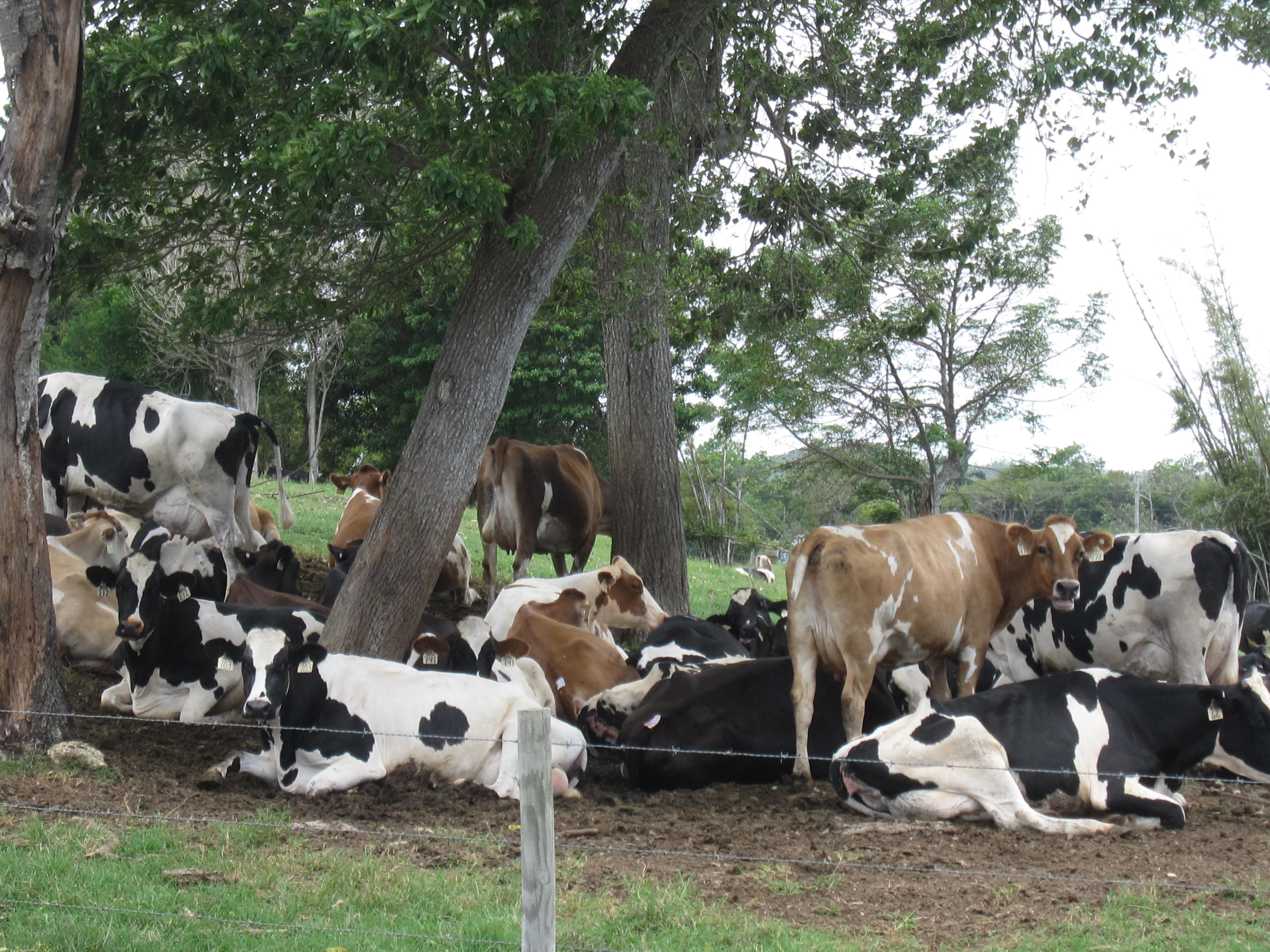
The milk industry of Arecibo on display near Sector Noriega, Jardines de Bethania and Sector San Luis

== See also ==
- List of communities in Puerto Rico
- List of barrios and sectors of Arecibo, Puerto Rico
