= Factor, Arecibo, Puerto Rico =

Barrio of Puerto Rico

Factor
- Barrio
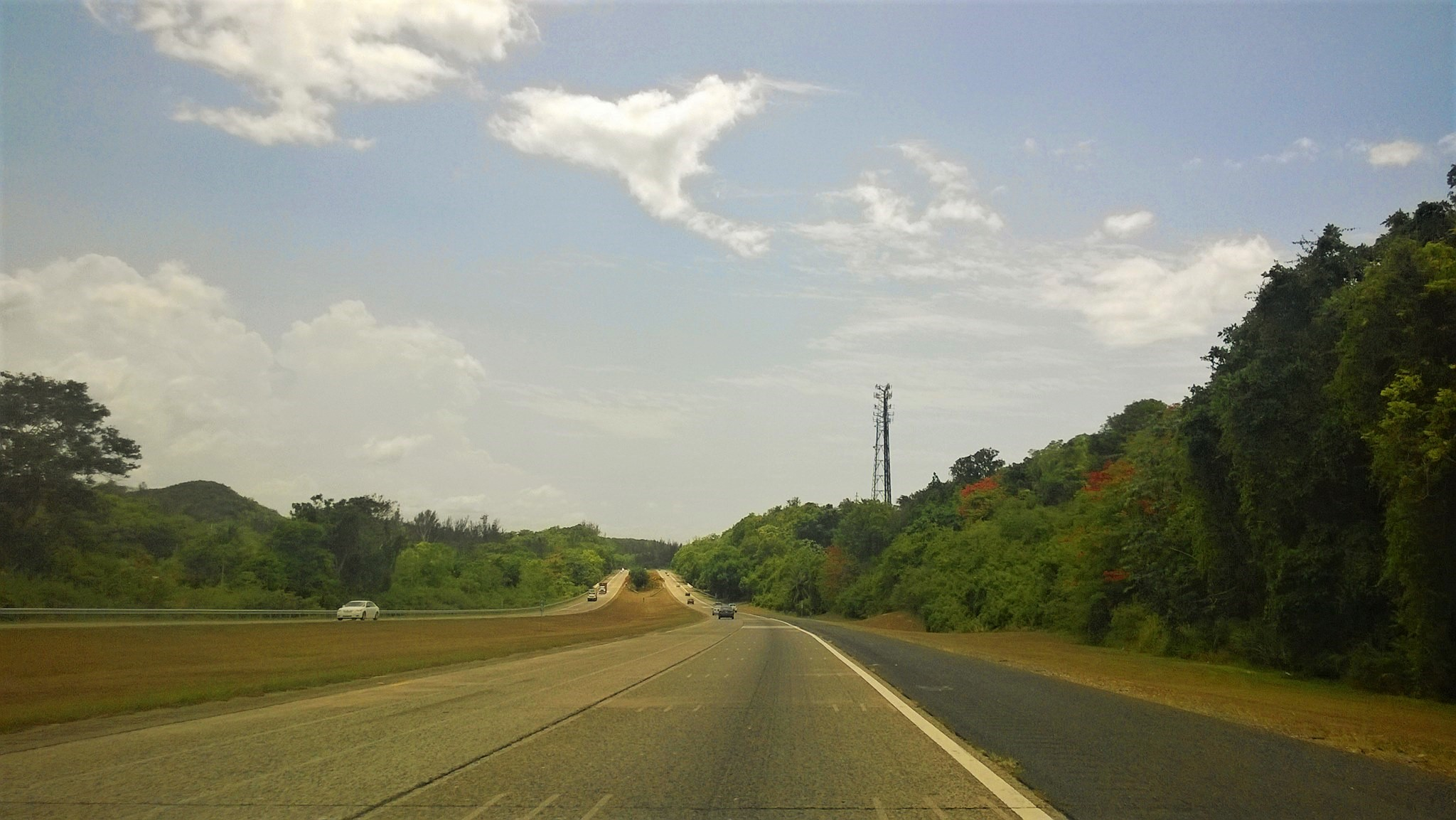
- Puerto Rico Highway 22 in Factor

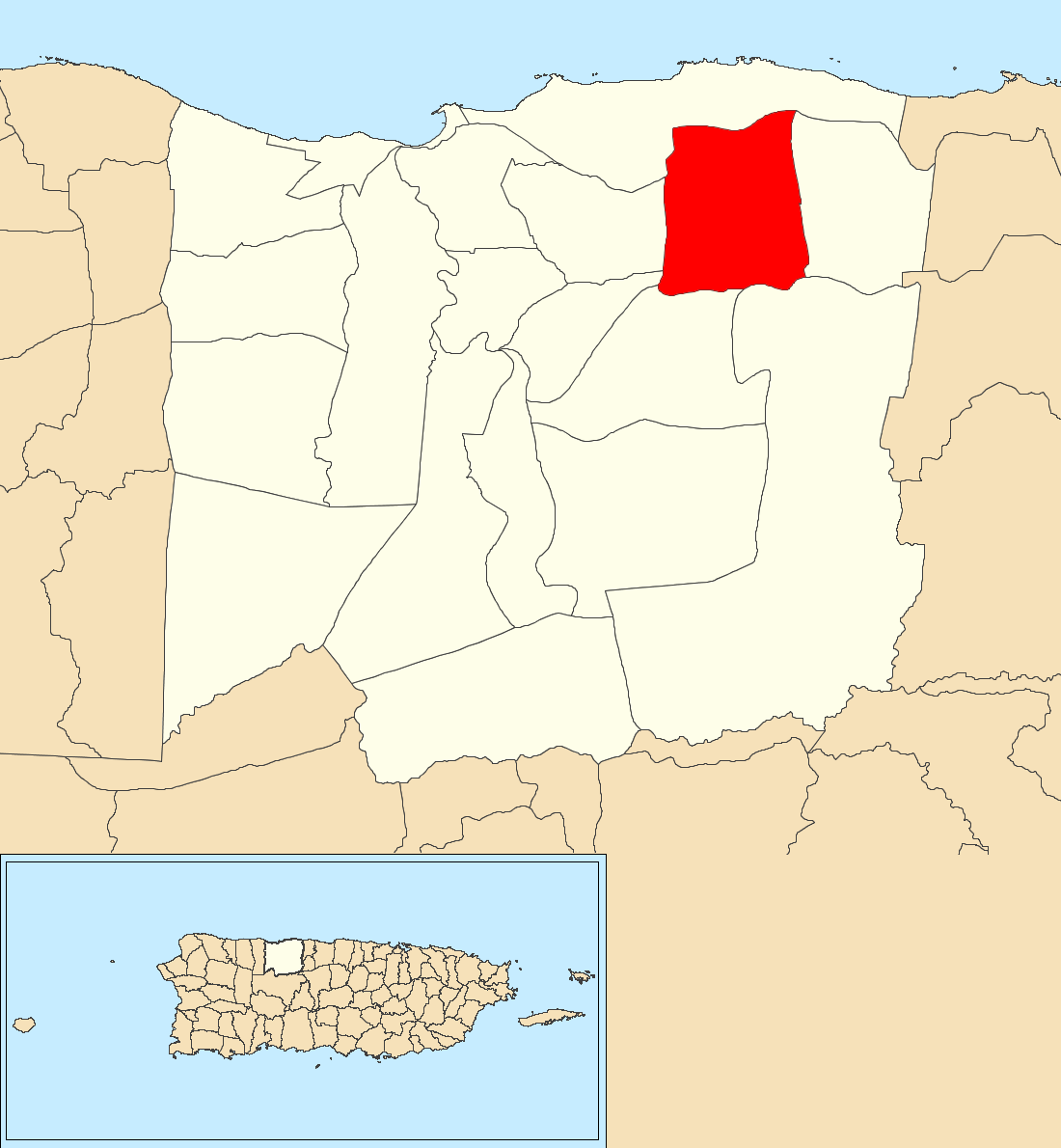
- Location of Factor within the municipality of Arecibo shown in red

- Location of Puerto Rico
- Coordinates: 18°27′29″N 66°38′02″W
- Commonwealth: Puerto Rico
- Municipality: Arecibo

Area
  - Total: 6.05 sq mi (15.7 km^{2})
  - Land: 6.03 sq mi (15.6 km^{2})
  - Water: 0.02 sq mi (0.052 km^{2})
- Elevation: 210 ft (64 m)

Population (2010)
  - Total: 8,001
  - Density: 1,329.1/sq mi (513.2/km^{2})
- Source: 2010 Census
- Time zone: UTC−4 (AST)

Factor is a barrio in the municipality of Arecibo, Puerto Rico. Its population in 2010 was 8,001.

== History ==
Factor was in Spain's gazetteers until Puerto Rico was ceded by Spain in the aftermath of the Spanish–American War under the terms of the Treaty of Paris of 1898 and became an unincorporated territory of the United States. In 1899, the United States Department of War conducted a census of Puerto Rico finding that the population of Factor barrio was 1,072.

Historical population
Census	Pop.	Note	%±
1900	1,072		—
1910	1,139		6.3%
1920	1,553		36.3%
1930	1,549		−0.3%
1940	1,482		−4.3%
1950	2,370		59.9%
1960	2,487		4.9%
1970	2,715		9.2%
1980	3,576		31.7%
1990	4,904		37.1%
2000	6,819		39.0%
2010	8,001		17.3%
U.S. Decennial Census; 1899 (shown as 1900) 1910-1930; 1930-1950 1980-2000 2010

== Sectors ==
Barrios (which are, in contemporary times, roughly comparable to minor civil divisions) in turn are further subdivided into smaller local populated place areas/units called sectores (sectors in English). The types of sectores may vary, from normally sector to urbanización to reparto to barriada to residencial, among others.

The following sectors are in Factor barrio:

Calle Los Méndez, Calle Los Rivera, Comunidad Ánimas, Comunidad Factor I, Hacienda El Paraíso, Reparto Pastrana, Sector 50 Cuerdas, Sector Ánimas Sur, Sector Ánimas, Sector Cercadillo, Sector El Palmar, Sector Factor I, Sector La PRRA, Sector Las Arenas, Sector Las Flores, Sector Polilla, Urbanización Campos, Urbanización Estancias de Arecibo, Urbanización Jardines Factor, Urbanización Los Jardines, Urbanización Paseos de la Reina, Urbanización Paseos Reales, Urbanización Puerta del Este, and Urbanización Vistamar Estate.

== See also ==
- List of communities in Puerto Rico
- List of barrios and sectors of Arecibo, Puerto Rico
