= Digital billboard =

Electronic advertising display

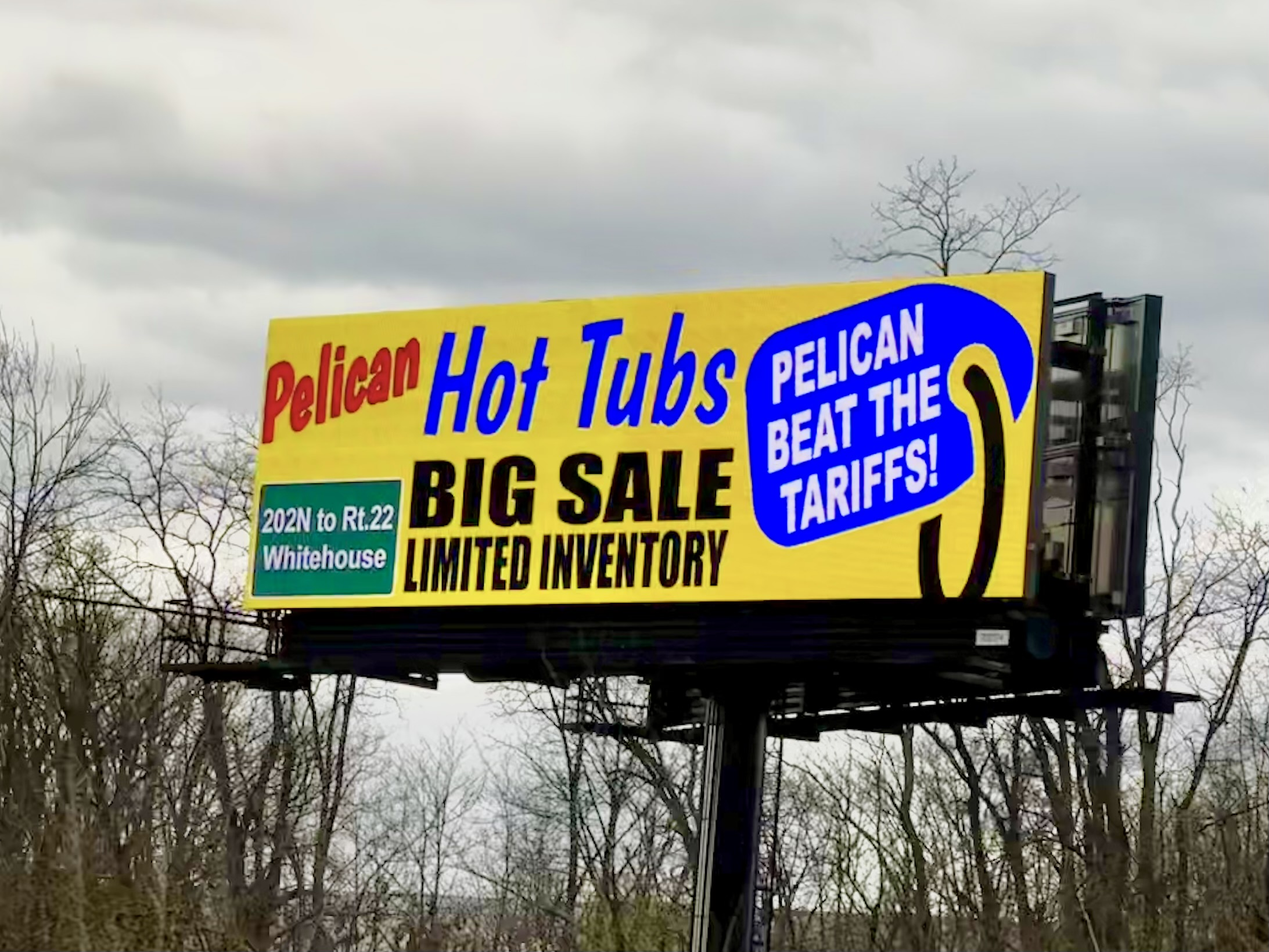
Digital billboard for a hot tub company in New Jersey

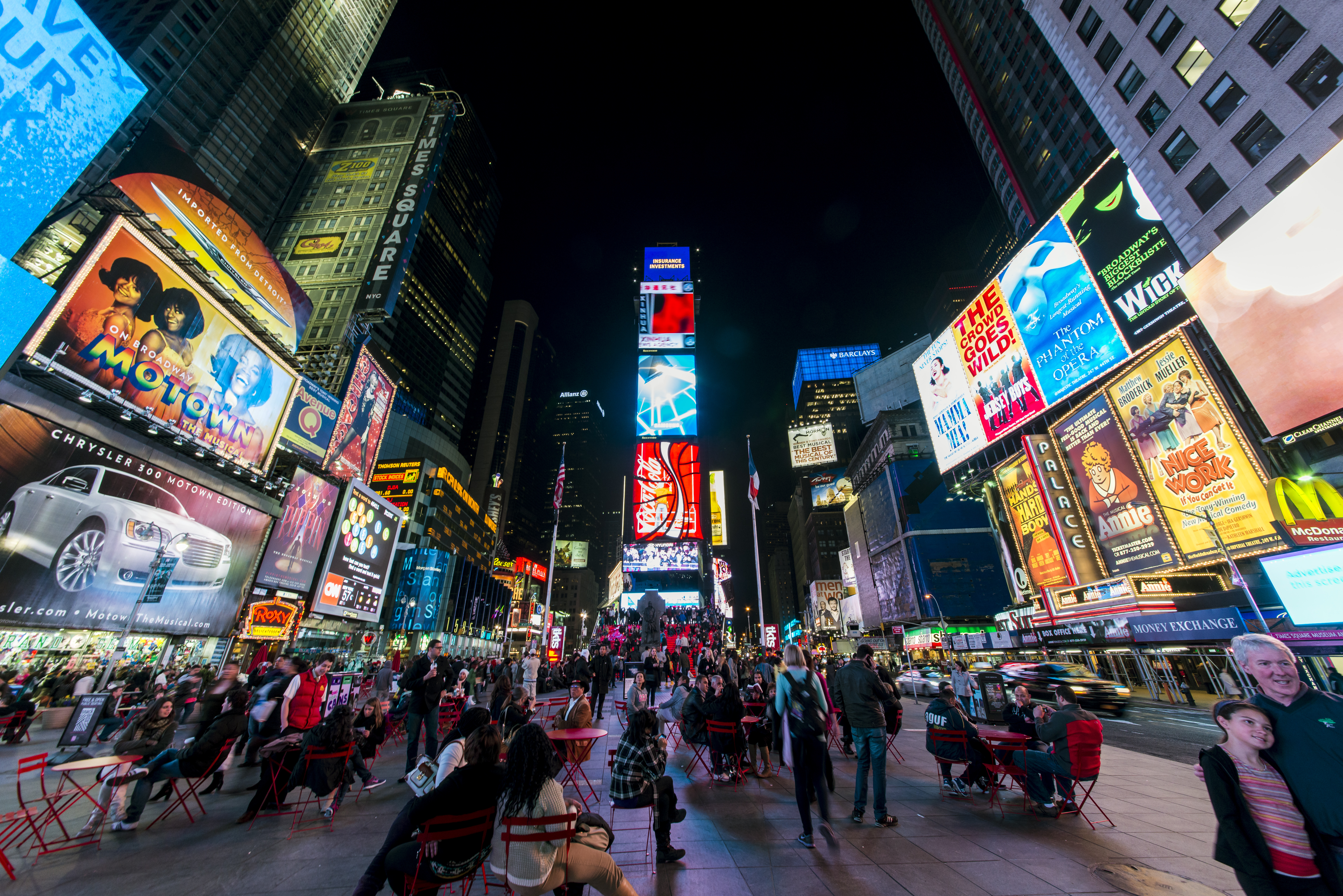
Digital billboards abound in Times Square, Manhattan.

A digital billboard or a digital bulletin is a billboard that displays digital images that are changed by a computer every few seconds. Digital billboards are primarily used for advertising, but they can also serve public service purposes. These are positioned on highly visible, heavy traffic locations such as expressways and major roadways.

== History ==
The first proper billboards were invented in the 1830s by Jared Bell in America, who wanted to advertise a circus and so put up a large and colourful billboard in 1835. P.T. Barnum saw the benefits of this advertising medium, and also followed suit. In 2005, the first digital billboards were installed.

== Safety concerns ==
There have been concerns regarding road safety when digital billboards are present. The Federal Highway Administration (FHWA) conducted a study in 2001 to review the effects of electronic billboards (EBBs) on crash rates. According to the FHWA, it appeared that there was no effective technique or method appropriate for evaluating the safety effects of EBBs on driver attention or distraction at that time. More recent and extensive studies have affirmed the negative impact of digital billboards on driver attention.

Today 46 states have passed laws permitting digital billboards, compared to approximately 33 in 2007. As of July 1, 2016, the OAAA reports that there are approximately 6,700 digital billboards installed in the U.S., and there are now over 1,000 localities allowing digital billboards.
