= Cuevas =

Cuevas or Cueva (Spanish for "cave(s)") may refer to:

== Places ==
- Cueva de Ágreda, a municipality located in the province of Soria, Castile and León, Spain
- Cuevas Bajas, a town and municipality in the province of Málaga, part of the autonomous community of Andalusia in southern Spain
- Cuevas de Almudén, a town in the province of Teruel, Aragón, Spain
- Cuevas del Almanzora, a municipality of Almería province, in the autonomous community of Andalusia, Spain
- Cuevas del Becerro, a town and municipality in the province of Málaga, part of the autonomous community of Andalusia in southern Spain
- Cuevas del Valle, a municipality in the province of Ávila, Castile and León, Spain
- Cuevas de Provanco, a municipality in the province of Segovia, Castile and León, Spain
- Cuevas de San Clemente, a municipality in the province of Burgos, Castile and León, Spain
- Cuevas de San Marcos, a town and municipality in the province of Málaga
- Cuevas de Vera, a town in south-eastern Spain, on the right bank of the river Almanzora
- Cuevas Labradas, a town in the province of Teruel, Aragón, Spain

== Caves ==
- Cueva de La Pasiega, a cave in the Spanish municipality of Puente Viesgo
- Cueva de las Manos, a cave in Santa Cruz Province, Argentina
- Cueva de los Casares, a cave in Guadalajara, Spain
- La Cueva del Indio, a cave in Puerto Rico, site of petroglyphs
- Cueva de los Verdes, a cave in the Canary Islands
- Cuevas de El Castillo or the Cave of El Castillo, an archaeological site within the complex of the Caverns of Monte Castillo
- Cuevas de Sorbas, limestone caves in Sorbas, Almeria, Spain

== Other uses ==
- Cueva people, an extinct indigenous people of Panama exterminated in the 16th century
- Cueva language, the language formerly spoken by the Cueva
- La Cueva High School, a public high school located in northeast Albuquerque, New Mexico
- Salamanca, cave that appears in numerous Hispanic American legends.

== People with the surname ==
=== Athletes ===
- Casandra Cuevas (born 1997), Mexican footballer
- Christian Cueva (born 1991), Peruvian football (soccer) player
- Cristián Cuevas (born 1995), Chilean footballer
- José "Pipino" Cuevas, Mexican boxer
- Josh Cuevas (born 2003), American football player
- Juan Cuevas, an Argentinian football (soccer) forward
- Lía Cueva, Mexican diver
- Mía Cueva, Mexican diver
- Nelson Cuevas, Paraguayan football (soccer) player
- Pablo Cuevas, Uruguayan tennis player
- William Cuevas, Venezuelan professional baseball pitcher

=== Artists ===
- Aida Cuevas, Mexican ranchera singer
- Carlos Cuevas, Spanish actor
- Earl A. Cuevas, Poet Laureate of Mississippi
- George de Cuevas, Chilean-born ballet impresario and choreographer
- José Luis Cuevas, Mexican painter and sculptor
- Juan Martín Cueva, Ecuadorian documentary film director
- Juan de la Cueva, Spanish dramatist and poet
- Beto Cuevas, the former lead singer of the now-defunct Chilean rock band, La Ley
- Manuel Cuevas, a costume designer for Rock and Roll and Country and Western singers
- Minerva Cuevas, a Mexican conceptual artist
- Patricio Cueva Jaramillo, Ecuadorian painter and journalist
- Sal Cuevas, bassist for Ray Barreto and the Fania All-Stars
- Sofía Cancino de Cuevas (1897–1982), Mexican composer, pianist, opera promoter, singer and symphonic conductor

=== Politicians ===
- Alfonso de la Cueva, marqués de Bedmar, Spanish diplomat and bishop
- Nora Cuevas (born 1959), Chilean public politician
- Carlos Cueva Tamaríz, Ecuadorian politician, lawyer and professor
- Fernando Cordero Cueva, Ecuadorian politician and architect
- Gabriela Cuevas Barron, Mexican politician affiliated to the National Action Party (PAN)
- Francisco Fernández de la Cueva, 10th Duke of Alburquerque, Viceroy of New Spain
- Luis Carvajal y de la Cueva, Portuguese-born Sephardi gobernador of Nuevo León
- Arlene Stringer-Cuevas (1933-2020), American politician

=== Other ===
- Altamiro de la Cueva, fictional character in a Spanish comic
- Andres Cuevas, Australian engineer
- Elvira Cuevas, Puerto Rican ecologist
- María Luisa Cuevas Rodríguez, Spanish chess master
- Keb Cuevas, Filipino environmentalist

== See also ==
- Las Cuevas (disambiguation)
