= Birth of the New World =

2016 statue by Zurab Tsereteli in Puerto Rico

- Nacimiento del Nuevo Mundo; La estatua de Colón
- Birth of the New World (Christopher Columbus monument) in Arecibo, Puerto Rico
- Interactive map of Birth of the New World
- Location: Arecibo, Puerto Rico
- Coordinates: 18.490106°N 66.626741°W
- Designer: Zurab Tsereteli
- Type: Statue
- Material: Bronze
- Height: 360 feet (110 m)
- Beginning date: 1991
- Completion date: Dedicated 2016

The Birth of the New World (Spanish: Nacimiento del Nuevo Mundo, colloquially known as La estatua de Colón, lit. Columbus's Statue) is a 361 foot (110 m) bronze sculpture located on the Atlantic coastline of Arecibo, Puerto Rico. When completed in 2016, it became the tallest sculpture in North America, (as well as the tallest not only in the United States, but in the Western Hemisphere in general) surpassing Mexico's Guerrero Chimalli (which measures 197 feet or 60 meters in height including its base), and the fourth tallest worldwide, after the Statue of Unity in India (597 ft; 182 m), the Spring Temple Buddha in China (420 ft; 130 m), and the Laykyun Sekkya in Myanmar (380 ft; 120 m). After being imported to Puerto Rico, there were plans for it to be erected in Cataño. After being moved to Mayagüez and facing further delays, Birth of the New World was assembled at its current location.

== History ==
Originally designed by Georgian sculptor Zurab Tsereteli as a monument to commemorate the 500th anniversary of Christopher Columbus's first voyage, Birth of the New World was constructed in 1991. Known for his monumental statues, Tsereteli passed away at the age of 91 on April 22, 2025 in his home outside of Moscow. The statue prominently depicts Columbus controlling an anachronistic depiction of a steering wheel, with a backdrop featuring the Niña, Pinta and Santa María traversing the Atlantic Ocean. Made of 2,750 bronze and steel pieces and weighing more than 1,300,000 pounds (650 short tons; 590 tonnes), the monument's 360 ft (110 m) height made it the tallest in the Western Hemisphere during the last decade of the 20th century, dwarfing the Statue of Liberty and the Monumento a la Virgen de la Paz.

Tsereteli offered Birth of the New World to the cities of Baltimore, Fort Lauderdale, Miami Beach, New York City and Columbus, Ohio, but none of those cities accepted it, considering it an eyesore due to its disproportionate features or because its size would affect their skylines. Amid its long search for a home, the statue gathered the derisive nicknames of "Chris Kong", "Robo-Columbus", and "From Russia with Ugh" while searching for a base. Despite the hindrances, the monument was featured on a Russian stamp. A smaller and modified version, named The Birth of a New Man and meant to be the European link of a two-part composition along with Birth of the New World, was adopted by Seville, Spain, and dedicated there in 1995.

=== Search for a location ===
==== New York City ====
In 1991, New York City was the first to be offered the statue. Tsereteli proposed erecting the statue on Roosevelt Island. However, this plan was met with concerns of its size, as it would visually dwarf the Statue of Liberty, and would itself be dwarfed itself by the skyscrapers of the city's skyline that sat in close proximity to Roosevelt Island. Plans for it to be located in New York City were briefly resurrected in 1997 when then-real estate developer Donald Trump proposed that the statue be at his development of rail yards, but this was nixed by city leadership including mayor Rudy Giuliani.

==== Miami Beach ====
In 1992, the Miami area was offered the statue, after financier and investor Bennett S. LeBow sought to see it erected at South Pointe in Miami Beach, near the Government Cut entrance of the Port of Miami. Supporters argued that it had the potential to become an icon for the City of Miami. The sculpture attracted local criticism, including for the fact that the design included a depiction of a ship's wheel, despite the fact that this device would not supplant the use of tillers for over 250 years after Columbus's first voyage to the Americas. Native American activist groups also expressed concern over a statue that celebrated a man whom they regarded as a rapist and murderer. Plans to erect it in Miami ultimately failed due to the large costs associated with erecting the statue.

==== Fort Lauderdale ====
In 1992, as plans to locate it in Miami were fizzling out, Fort Lauderdale, Florida City Commissioner Gary Keno expressed interest in locating it in his city. The head of the sculpture was shipped to the city that year, in hopes of stoking support for erecting the statue there. Keno found little support for displaying the head in a city park. The head would ultimately remain in a warehouse there for six years.

Native American activist groups again expressed concern.

==== Columbus, Ohio ====
In 1993, the city of Columbus, Ohio was offered the statue. Governor George V. Voinovich expressed interest, sending a letter of intent. Proponents argued that it could become an icon for the city, and would be a tourist generator. The costs associated with erecting the statue, again, posed an issue. Mayor Greg Lashutka refused to spend any city funds on erecting the statue. Despite his support for the statue, Governor Voinovich stated that no state money was available to erect the statue. This would mean that citizens groups would be required to raise as much as $25 million for the statue to be erected in Columbus. Additionally, Native American activist groups again raised concern. The statue also met criticism for its massive size and criticisms that it would appear gaudy.

==== St. Petersburg, Florida ====
In 1995, Tsereteli sought to convince the city of St. Petersburg, Florida to become the home of his statue. However, his overtures were met with large disinterest by the city.

==== Baltimore ====
In 1997, there was an effort to locate the statue in Baltimore's Inner Harbor. Locations floated for the statue to be located in the Inner Harbor included Fort Carroll and the site of a former Allied Chemical plant on the east side of the Inner Harbor. Joseph DiCara, whose construction management firm would be responsible for assembling the statue if it were built in Baltimore, advocated for it to be erected in the city. Some other local businessmen, local Italian American community leaders, and politicians also lent their support. Supporters touted its potential as a tourist attraction. Mayor Kurt Schmoke was initially interested in the prospect of erecting the statue. However, his office also expressed concern over the city lacking resources to help finance its erection. Ivan Kazansky, the head of Moscow's Union of Sculptures, advised Baltimore against letting Tsereteli "ruin" their harbor. Additionally, concerns again arose over its size.

==== Cataño, Puerto Rico ====
In 1998, Edwin "Amolao" Rivera Sierra, mayor of the municipality of Cataño in Puerto Rico, decided to acquire the monument. Despite being donated by Tsereteli, the cost of importing the statue was 2.4 million dollars, all of which was taken from the public treasury with the approval of governor Pedro Rosselló. Rivera Sierra insisted that the municipal treasury would not lose a single cent on the project, and planned to erect the monument near the entrance of Cataño Bay. The unassembled pieces of the statue were relocated to an adjacent recreational park upon arriving on 12 November 1998. In its original plan, construction would have begun in 1999, with the dedication taking place in October 2000. However, the project caused immediate controversy; several homes would have to be destroyed to make way for it and the cost of its assembly was deemed excessive. The Oficina del Contralor (Office of the Comptroller) opened an investigation into the transaction and found that the 1.6 million dollars in taxes that were due when the statue entered the port were not paid. The auditor also investigated the use of public funds to cover the travel expenses of Rivera Sierra when personally meeting Tsereteli in Russia.

The monument also would have been high enough that concerns were raised that it would interfere with air traffic to nearby Luis Muñoz Marín International Airport. Ultimately, the Puerto Rico Port Authority denied Cataño the permits required to advance, citing "security concerns". The central government decided to stop providing any funding for the project. The unassembled pieces remained stored near Cataño Bay for several years. Rivera Sierra's successor, Wilson Soto, declared that the municipality would not invest any public funds in the project. By this time, some of the pieces were beginning to show signs of rusting, and storing the pieces was costing $1.6 million in taxes per year, not including the salaries of several security guards. The municipality also lost an estimated income of $200,000 that the recreational park would have provided were it open to the public. The total cost of the project was re-estimated due to the necessity of replacing several parts and some of the supporting steel structures, fixing exposure damage and the additional need for a sandblasting procedure. In early 2005, Tsereteli began searching for developers that would take over the project. However, these efforts were interrupted by Soto, who considered that simply assembling the statue was not enough to attract tourism. He suggested that the entire area would need to be developed. The size of the project caused potential developers to lose interest.

On 16 August 2008, the municipality confirmed that Birth of a New World had been transferred to Holland Group Port Investment (HGPI), a private group that was involved in the development of the Mayagüez port. Soto justified the action by claiming that simply storing the pieces was costing the public treasury 4 million dollars, and that Cataño could not afford a project that would exceed $100 million. The private entity transferred the pieces to its facilities in Mayagüez, announcing its intention to assemble the statue near the coastline in time for the 2010 Central American and Caribbean Games that were being held in that municipality. HGPI devised a plan to attract an estimated 500,000 tourists to with Birth of a New World as its cornerstone. A regional plan would include the establishment of a museum of history near the statue. The possibility of establishing a cruise route between Mayagüez and Seville was also explored. Once there, a Russian team examined the condition of the pieces and ensured that it could still be assembled.

==== Finding a home in Arecibo, Puerto Rico ====
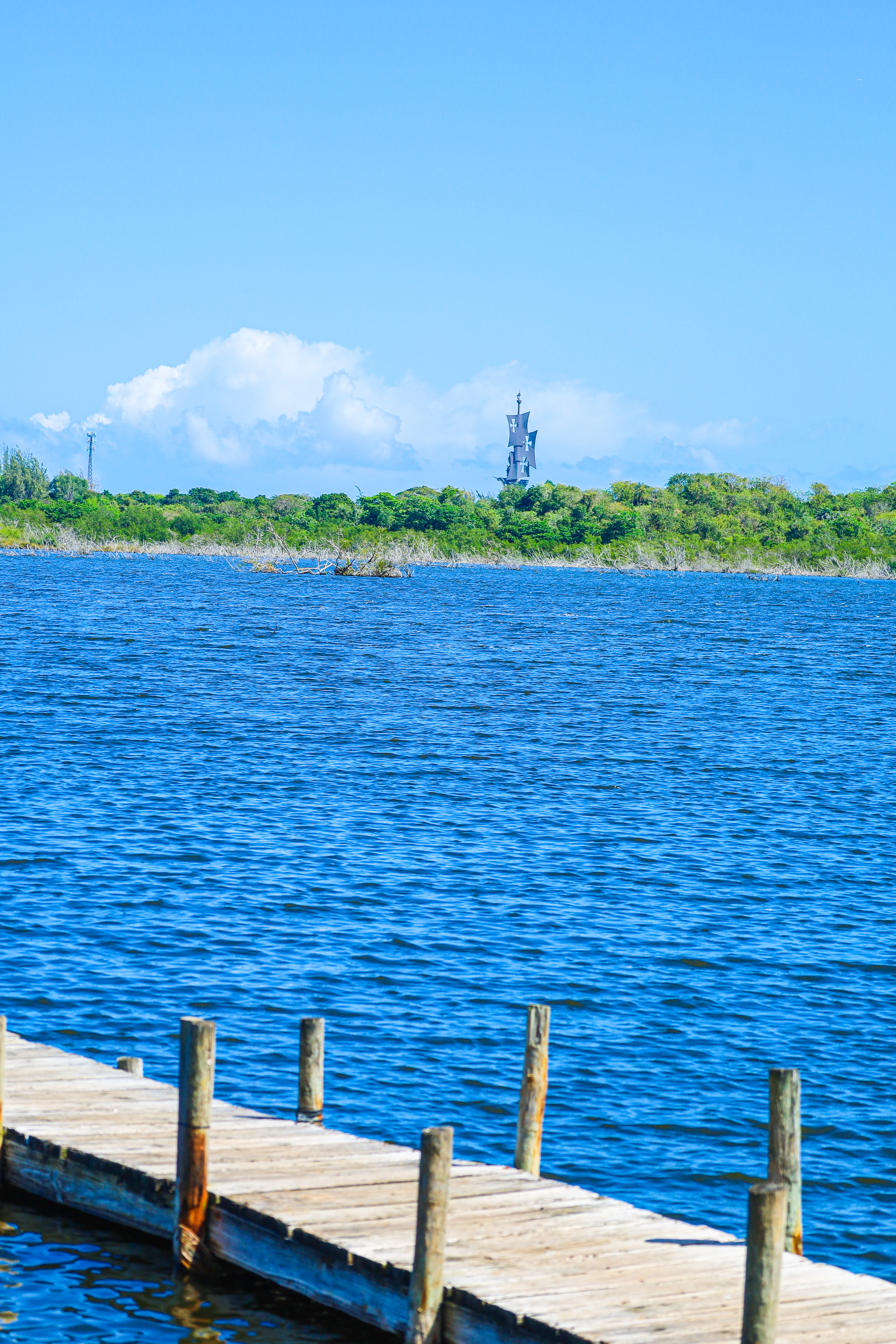
The statue from Caño Tiburones.

HGPI was unable to fulfill its plan in time, citing disinterest by the municipal government, and the statue was reassigned for a different project. Arecibo became a frontrunner, and Mayor Lemuel Soto began the permit process for a project that would combine the statue with other attractions, such as the Arecibo Observatory. However, the municipality faced competition; Representative David Bonilla Cortés requested that the statue be assembled on Desecheo Island and the newly elected mayor of Cataño, José Rosario, proposed using the statue as part of an eco park that would be constructed in the swampy region of Ciénaga las Cucharillas. San Juan also tentatively considered the project, but lost interest due to the condition of the pieces. Ultimately, Tsereteli decided that it was "too late" to consider other venues and settled for Arecibo. However, once there the monument faced more controversy, this time by activists that condemned Columbus' role in opening the door to the European genocide of indigenous peoples and by groups that opposed its impact in the maritime-terrestrial zone. Eventually, the Luis Fortuño administration began processing the respective permits.

In 2012, Rosario denounced the Puerto Rico Department of Treasury for imposing nearly $3 million in retroactive taxes for the original transaction and unfinished projects related to it, resulting in an embargo of the municipality's income. In June 2012, the first pieces began arriving at Barrio Islote in Arecibo. Birth of the New World became the main attraction of a tourist project called Columbus Theme Park (later renamed Terravista ParkLand) developed by Pan American Grain, which the administration expected would produce 4.6 million dollars in income per year and recruit 900 new employees. The assembly investment was now estimated at $98 million, with only the reclassification of the zone preventing the project's advance. This process was completed by January 2013. On 11 February 2014, a contemporary-Taíno movement, named Movimiento Indígena Jíbaro Boricua, joined other anti-Columbus factions in protest the impending assembly of the monument.

The monument survived the passing of Cat. 5 Hurricane Maria in September 2017 without structural damage. However, the adjacent infrastructure was heavily affected. The remodeling of the beach house (which is expected to host the visitor center), as well as the construction of new roads, parking and a plaza were all halted. Reforestation efforts in the area were completely reverted after the winds decimated the flora. These developments forced architect Roberto Alsina to delay the timetable and reconsider strategies, this while working to undo the damage to the area that would host the Terravista ParkLand.

=== Tsereteli et al. v. González Freyre et al. ===
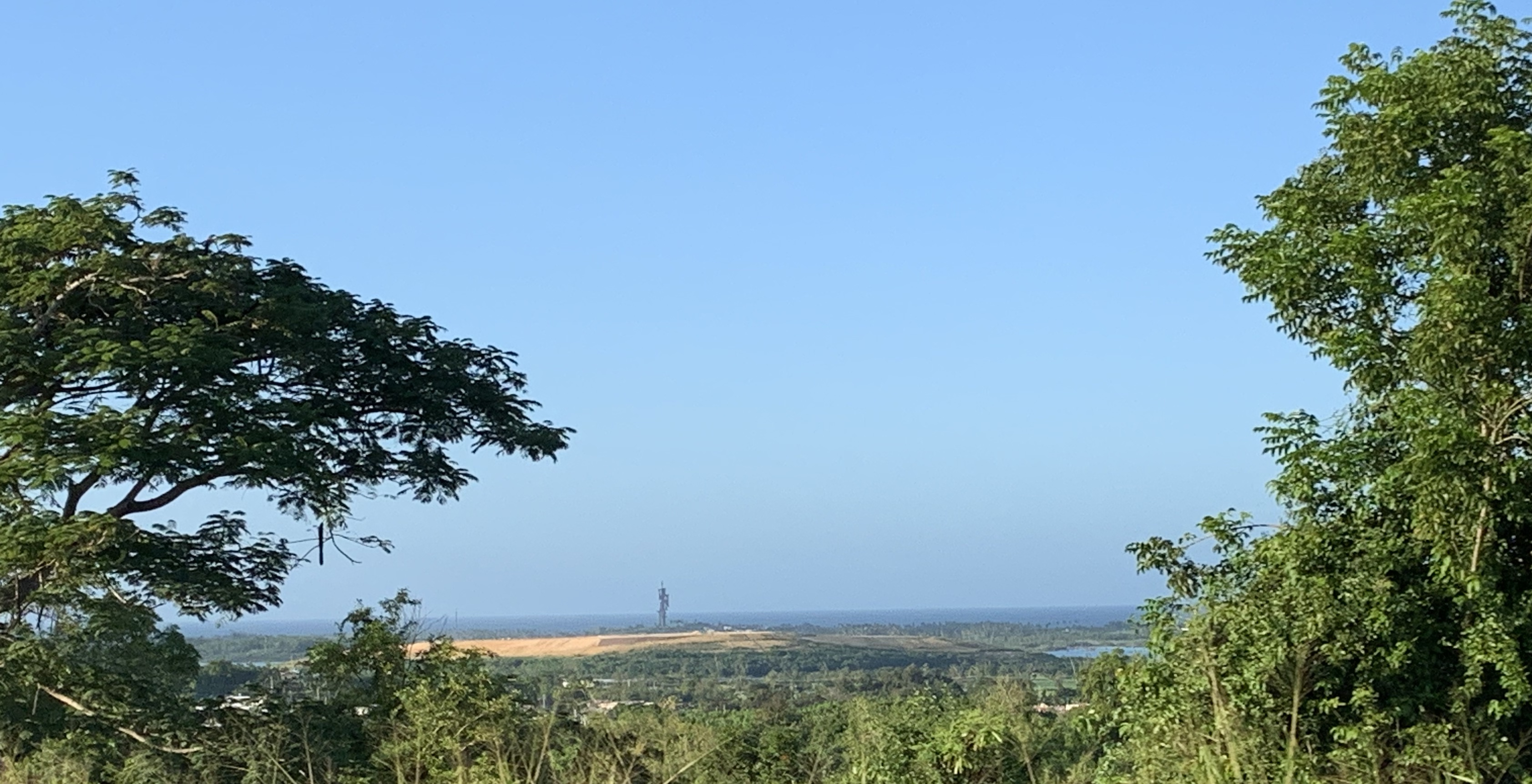
Status of land development as of December 2019.

On 14 March 2019, Tsereteli sued González Freyre, Pan American Grain and Columbus Park Corporation, claiming that previous agreements had not been fulfilled as the sculptor's corporation – Birth of New World LLC – had not been refunded an investment of $17 million (for transferring it between Mayagüez and Arecibo) or received ownership of the terrains. This conflict prevented plans from fully opening to the public and prompted the municipality to change dates for the formal inauguration on multiple occasions. Tsereteli was stated to be content with the visibility gained by the monument and unconcerned by the possibility of it remaining closed off for the time being.

During a year, beginning when a contract was signed in November 2013, both sides discussed the transfer of between 766 and 866 yards (700 and 792 m) of the plot to an entity of the author's choosing. However, González Freyre claims that Tsereteli did not discuss the matter again until he issued a warning in late 2018, after more than a year of no communication, and that the Russian artist did not heed attempts to mediate. The monument is assembled but the development of the Terravista ParkLand had yet to begin following the hurricane delays and is expected to take up to five years. In 2021, both sides worked on a settlement to continue the project as a joint venture.

== Economic impact ==
Prior to the inauguration, an economic study by consulting firm Estudios Técnicos, estimated that the statue would attract at least 300,000 tourists per year to the municipality, with additional income from taxes related to the project. Shortly after its assembly was completed, the Puerto Rico Tourism Company labelled Birth of the New World a potential anchor attraction for the north region. In 2019, then-mayor Carlos Molina stated that the increased traffic of people interested in seeing the monument had been the main motivator behind the opening of several new businesses in the municipality. He considered that Birth of the New World became “a tourist attraction for the local and foreign visitor”. He quantified the economic impact as of 2020 at 1,000 new jobs, 100 businesses and 500 property acquisitions. The volume of people stopping along Puerto Rico Highway 22 (unsigned Interstate PR2) to see the monument motivated a legislative bill to build a lookout and rest area.

In 2021, Ernesto González Rodríguez, town hall secretary of Carlos Ramírez (who succeeded Molina), acknowledged that Columbus is a controversial topic but noted that the tourism that the monument attracts is beneficial to the town's coffers. Despite logistic issues involving the traffic to the area and an international trend of removing statues depicting Columbus, Birth of the New World was considered the main attraction in the area following the collapse of the Arecibo Observatory and the municipal administration opposed the demolition demanded by activists. Restaurants and bars have been the most benefited from the increased clientele.

== See also ==
- List of the tallest statues in the United States
- List of tallest statues
- Peter the Great Statue, a similar statue in Moscow
