= Peter the Great Statue =

Monument in Moscow, Russia

- Interactive map of Peter the Great Statue
- Location: Moscow, Russia
- Coordinates: 55°44′19″N 37°36′30″E
- Designer: Zurab Tsereteli
- Opening date: 1997

The Peter the Great Statue is a 98-metre-high (322 ft) monument to Peter the Great, located at the western confluence of the Moskva River and the Vodootvodny Canal in central Moscow, Russia. It was designed by the Georgian designer Zurab Tsereteli to commemorate 300 years of the Russian Navy, which Peter the Great established. Erected in 1997, the sculpture weighs around 1000 tons and contains 600 tons of stainless steel, bronze and copper.

== History ==
Since its inception, the statue has courted controversy. In November 2008, it was voted the tenth ugliest building in the world by Virtual Tourist. In 2010, it was included in a list of the world's ugliest statues by Foreign Policy magazine. Lonely Planet commented: "Questions of taste aside, Muscovites were sceptical about the whole idea: why pay tribute to Peter the Great, who loathed Moscow and moved the capital to St Petersburg?"

The designer Zurab Tsereteli is known as a friend and favorite of Moscow's former Mayor Yury Luzhkov, and the artist received a number of municipal art commissions under his patronage, such as the Cathedral of Christ the Savior, the Manege Square ensemble and the War Memorial Complex on Poklonnaya Gora. In October 2010, following Luzhkov's departure from office, Moscow authorities, reportedly keen to get rid of the Peter the Great Statue, offered to relocate it to Saint Petersburg, but this offer was refused by the city. Authorities in Arkhangelsk and Petrozavodsk have offered to accept the monument.

The statue is allegedly based on a design originally intended to commemorate the 500th anniversary of the first voyage of Christopher Columbus in 1992. When an American customer for the project could not be found, it was re-purposed with a Russian theme. Tsereteli denies this story.

A separate, equally colossal statue of Columbus, known as Birth of the New World, by the same designer was constructed in Puerto Rico in 2016, after being rejected by various continental US cities. The statue was unveiled in the city of Arecibo on 14 June 2016. A somewhat smaller but similar sculpture by Tsereteli, Birth of a New Man, was deposited in Seville.
