= Las Cuevas =

Las Cuevas (Spanish for the caves) may refer to:

== Places ==
Argentina

- Las Cuevas, Mendoza, municipality in Mendoza Province, Argentina
- Las Cuevas, Entre Ríos, municipality in Entre Ríos Province, Argentina
- Las Cuevas, Chubut, near Puerto Madryn, Chubut Province, Argentinian Patagonia

Belize

- Las Cuevas, Belize

Bolivia

- Las Cuevas, Bolivia

Mexico

- Las Cuevas, Tamaulipas

Spain

- Navares de las Cuevas, municipality in the province of Segovia, Castile and León
- Las Cuevas, Anguiano, village in the municipality of Anguiano, autonomous community of La Rioja
- Las Cuevas, Málaga, village in the municipality of Málaga, Andalusia

Trinidad and Tobago

- Las Cuevas, Trinidad and Tobago

== People ==
- Armand de Las Cuevas (1968–2018), a retired French racing cyclist
- Miguel de las Cuevas (born 1986), a Spanish football (soccer) player

== Other ==
- Las Cuevas War, a brief armed conflict between a force of Texas Rangers commanded by Capt. Leander McNelly and an irregular force of Mexican militia

== See also ==
- Cuevas (disambiguation)
