= Noralma Vera Arrata =

Ecuadorian prima ballerina (born 1936)

- Born: Noralma Beatriz Vera Arrata; August 28, 1936 (age 89); Guayaquil, Ecuador
- Occupations: Prima ballerina, Choreographer
- Spouse: Patricio Cueva Jaramillo

Noralma Vera Arrata (born 28 August 1936) is a former Ecuadorian prima ballerina and choreographer.

Vera Arrata was born in Guayaquil, Ecuador where she grew up as the only daughter among three sons of the distinguished politician and former Culture minister Alfredo Vera Vera and his wife, Baltita Arrata Macias. She comes from a prominent intellectual family in the country. Her brother, Alfredo Vera Arrata, is a former Education minister and Minister of Interior of Ecuador. Her uncle was the writer Pedro Jorge Vera. Noralma Vera married 1959 the painter Patricio Cueva Jaramillo in Ecuador in order to departure with him to Cuba. Her father-in-law was the politician Carlos Cueva Tamaríz.

== Education and career ==
She began to dance in 1945 in Guayaquil. On February 21, 1957 she traveled to London due to a scholarship to perfectionate her dancing at The Royal Ballet. By then, Vera was already a prominent figure in her home country and her departure was well publicitied in the media. She danced 1958 in Paris under Gzovsky and Jeanine Charrat. 1960 she went to Cuba with her husband, where she worked with Alicia Alonso until 1968 when she returned to her home country.

In 1968 she presented Affirmation, a ballet with music by Carlos Chávez. Her interest for modern dance took her to introduce the Graham technique for contemporary dance in Ecuador, which she had learned in 1972 at the Martha Gram Dance School in New York City. The Ecuadorian National Ballet Company was created on 7 June 1976 in Quito and Noralma Vera, by then Director of the National Dance Institute, was elected as part of the Directors Board. Vera founded in 1978 her own ballet company and academy in her home city. After retiring from active dancing, Vera worked as a diplomat in Mexico and Cuba.

== Awards ==
- Distinción al Mérito Artístico (1955)
- Premio Latinoamericano de Ballet (1956)
- Reconocimiento al Mérito Artístico, Subsecretaria de Cultura (1994)

== Trivia ==
It is said that her father invented the name Noralma for her. Today many women in the country are named Noralma after her.

== See also ==
- List of Ecuadorians
