= Alfredo Vera Arrata =

Ecuadorian politician

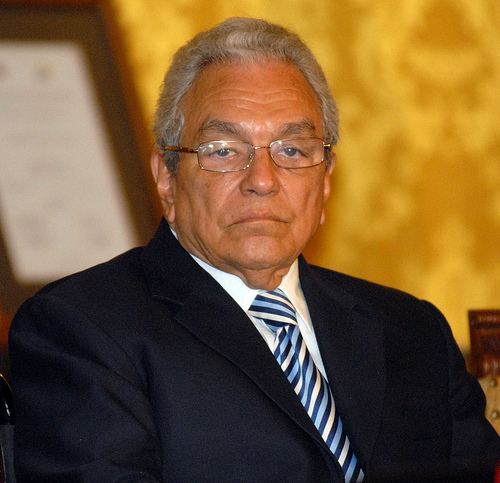

Alfredo Vera Arrata (Guayaquil, 1935) was the Minister of Interior of Ecuador from January 2011 to June 2011.

== Personal and early life ==
Born to the politician and lawyer Alfredo Vera Vera and his wife, Baltita Arrata Macías, Alfredo Vera Arrata was born in Guayaquil as the second of four children. During his childhood he contagioned poliomyelitis and as a consequence of his illness he was unable to do sports and was forced to wear special shoes. Nevertheless, he grew up as any other child in the neighborhood. Although middle class, he comes from a prominent intellectual family. His sister is the former ballet dancer and Ecuadorian prima ballerina Noralma Vera Arrata and his uncle the writer Pedro Jorge Vera.

== Education ==
Alfredo Vera attended in his home city to the then prestigious High School Colegio Nacional Aguirre Abad. Subsequently, he studied architecture in the university of Guayaquil and got the degree of architect with a major in urban planning in 1970.

== Professional life ==
For 15 years Vera Arrata worked as architecture professor at the University of Guayaquil. At the same time, he worked as an urban planner at the consulting firm CONSUR.

Since 1976 he works at the Guayasamin Foundation as a leading executive due to his family ties to Oswaldo Guayasamín (Vera Arrata is married to his daughter Saskia). He brought forward the materialisation of the La Capilla del Hombre ("The Chapel of Man") and furthermore, the development of painture in Ecuador.

=== Political life ===
Already as a student, and partially due to his family upbringing, Alfredo Vera had a big interest for politics and even got to be vice president of the National Students Association (FEUE) in Guayaquil. In addition, he was also a leader of the Movimiento Unión Revolucionaria de Juventudes Ecuatorianas, a leftwing revolucionary student association. He paid this with liberty and exile: In 1963 he left Ecuador and went to other Latin Américan countries, among them Chile and Cuba. The dictatorial regime imprisoned him for a year after returning illegally to Ecuador.

Since 1984 he is a member of the Party of the Democratic Left under which he served in 1986 as congressman for the province of Guayas and as education minister from 1988 to 1991. In 1992 he served as a member of Congress, in 1998 as a member of the Constituent assembly for Pichincha and as member of Quito's city council. 2008 he served as National Anti-Corruption Secretary under President Rafael Correa. Also during the presidency of Mr. Correa he served at the Ministry of The Interior for almost six months in 2011.

Political offices
Preceded by Iván Gallegos Domínguez	Secretary of Education; 1988-1991	Succeeded by Raúl Vallejo
Preceded by José Luis Cortázar	National Anticorruption Secretary of Ecuador; 2007– present	Incumbent

== Publications ==
- Historia de un Triste Banano (1970)
- Investigación Social en la Arquitectura (1974)
- El Lleve de la Perimetral (1987)
- El Contrajuicio (1991)
- Enigmas de la Educación (1998)
- Larga Crónica de la Constituyente por Dentro (1999)

== See also ==
- Noralma Vera Arrata
- Party of the Democratic Left
