= Juan Martín Cueva =

Ecuadorian film director

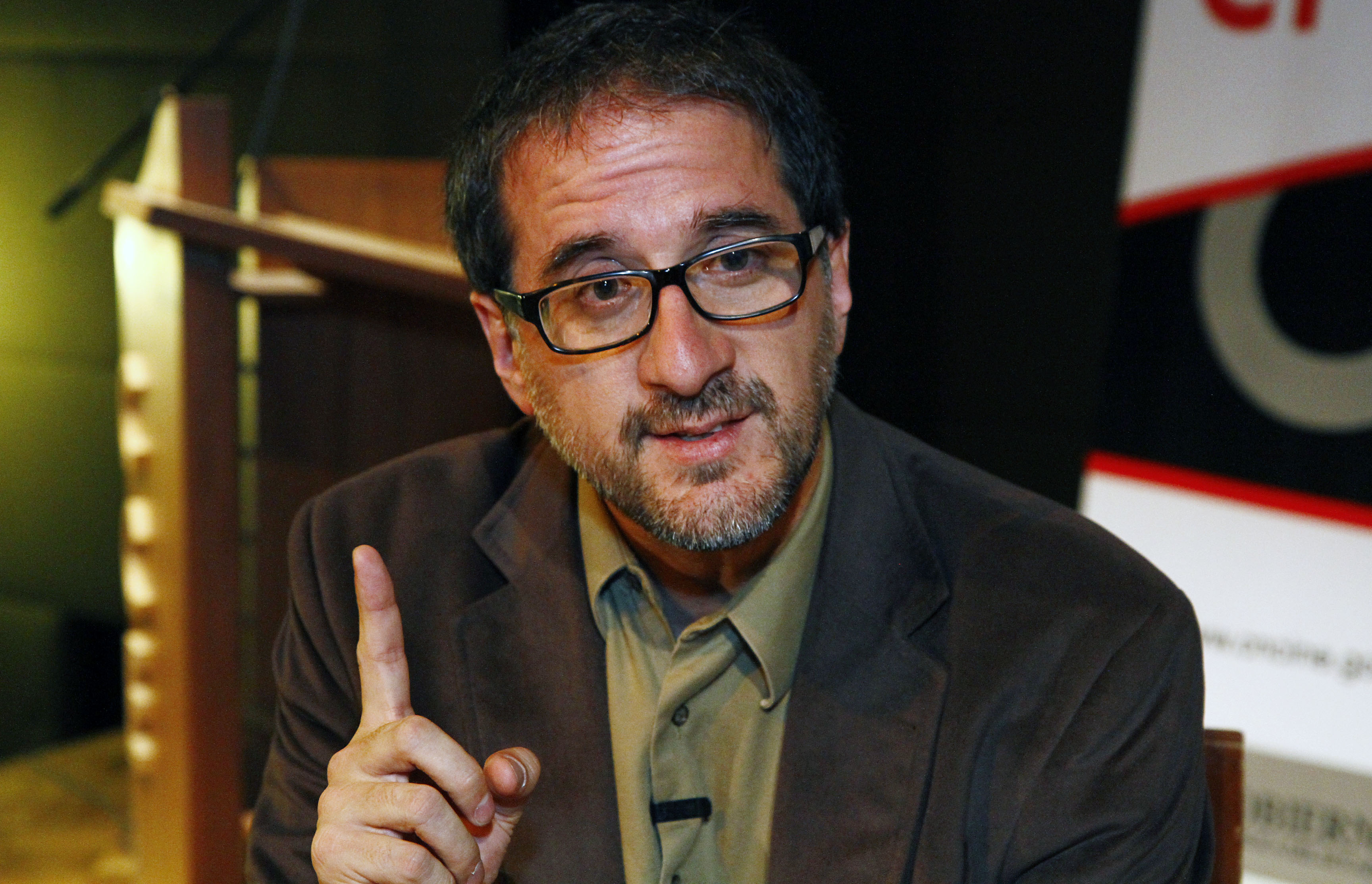
- Juan Martín Cueva in a 2015 interview
- Born: October 9, 1966 (age 58); Paris, France
- Occupation: film director

Juan Martín Cueva Armijos (born October 9, 1966) is an Ecuadorian documentary film director and the director of the film festival Cero Latitud in Quito. His documentary film Where the poles meet won the Best Documentary at the IX Festival Internacional de Cine de Valdivia in Chile and at the Brouillon d’un reve de la Scam in Paris in 1999.

Cueva was born in France, the first son of the diplomat and archaeologist Juan Cueva and his wife Magdalena Armijos. His paternal grandfather was the politician Carlos Cueva Tamaríz, his uncle the painter Patricio Cueva Jaramillo and his cousin Fernando Cordero Cueva is the current (2011) president of the Ecuadorian Congress.

Cueva spent his early childhood in many rural towns in Ecuador as his father worked as an archaeologist. The family moved later to Paris, where his father studied at the Sorbonne University and was later appointed Ambassador of Ecuador at the UNESCO. Cueva learned therefore French from an early age and later studied cinematography at the Institut National Superior des Arts du spectacle in Belgium.

His documentaries have appeared at many Film Festivals in Ecuador and abroad, such as Lateinamerikanische Filmtage 2008 in Munich and Chicago International Documentary Film Festival.

He has also taught in many Ecuadorian universities such as the Universidad de las Américas, Escuela de Cine y Actuación INCIN and the Universidad San Francisco de Quito.

== Films ==
- Este maldito país (2008)
- El lugar donde se juntan los polos (2002) - Best Documentary Film at the Festival Internacional de Cine de Valdiviam, Best Screenplay at the Festival Latinoamericano de Rosario, Prize of the Festival Sur Realidades Bogotá, Premio del 4to Festival de Cine Pobre Mexico and Prize Brouillon d’un reve de la SCAM Paris
- Ningún ser humano es ilegal (2001)
- Marineros (1997)
