= Zurab Tsereteli =

Georgian artist (1934–2025)

- ზურაბ წერეთელი Зураб Церетели
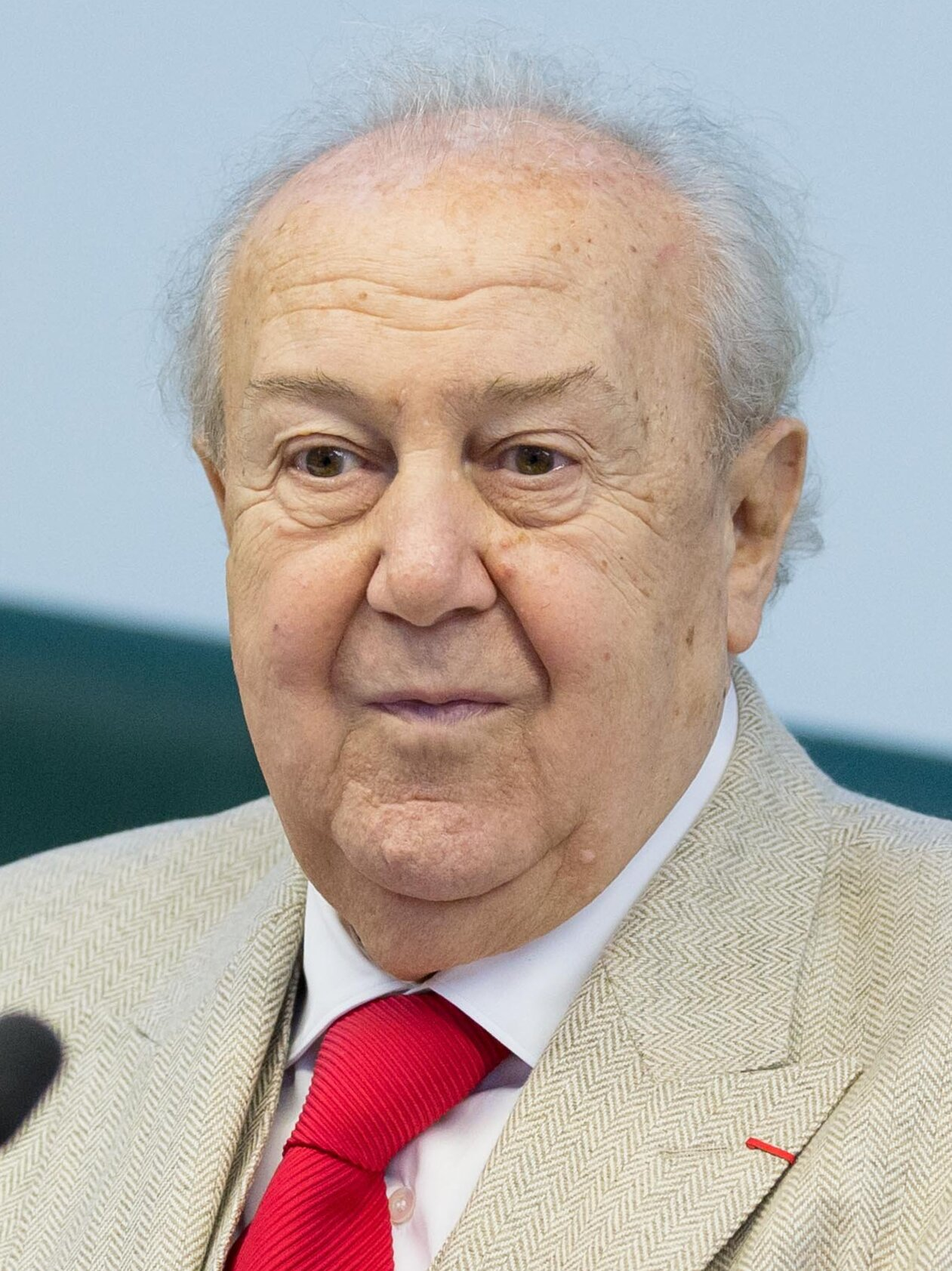
- Tsereteli in 2014
- Born: Zurab Konstantinovich Tsereteli; 4 January 1934; Tbilisi, Georgian SSR, Transcaucasian SFSR, Soviet Union
- Died: 22 April 2025 (aged 91); Peredelkino, Moscow Oblast, Russia
- Notable work: Peter the Great Statue; Birth of the New World; Tear of Grief
- Awards

Plaque bearing Tsereteli's name

Zurab Konstantinovich Tsereteli (Georgian: ზურაბ კონსტანტინეს ძე წერეთელი, romanized: zurab k'onst'ant'ines dze ts'ereteli; 4 January 1934 – 22 April 2025) was a Georgian painter, sculptor and architect known for large-scale and at times controversial monuments. Tsereteli served as the President of the Russian Academy of Arts from 1997 until his death.

== Life and career ==
Zurab Konstantinovich Tsereteli was born in Tbilisi on 4 January 1934. Tsereteli studied at Tbilisi State Academy of Arts and graduated from there in 1958. He was married to Inessa Andronikashvili.

Between the years 1960 and 1963, Tsereteli worked as a staff artist as the Georgian Academy of Sciences and participated in research expeditions, which in turn served to influence his work.

In 1964, he made his first trip abroad to France. He stayed in Paris for three months, during which time visited Pablo Picasso in his studio. This experience served to greatly shape his later creative production. At a later stage he also became acquainted with Marc Chagall, and as well as the work of Impressionist and Post-Impressionist artists, the influence of whom can also be seen in the Tsereteli's work.

In the 1970s, Tsereteli also designed several Soviet embassies and consulates over the world. In 1978–79, Tsereteli was invited to teach painting as a visiting professor at the College at Brockport, State University of New York.

In 1980, Tsereteli was appointed the chief designer for the XXII Summer Olympic Games in Moscow. In 1981, he became a professor at his alma mater, the Tbilisi Academy of Arts. In 1990, Good Defeats Evil, Tsereteli's interpretation of St. George slaying the dragon as an allegory for world peace in the modern age, was unveiled at the United Nations Headquarters in New York City.

In the 1990s, Tsereteli continued to work on public commissions for the city of Moscow, which many insist was due to his personal friendship with mayor Yuri Luzhkov. The most significant of these projects include: the reconstruction of Cathedral of Christ the Savior, Manege Square, the War Memorial Complex on Poklonnaya Gora, the Moscow Zoo, as well as the 98m tall Peter the Great, monument erected in 1996–97, which has elicited mixed feelings among the citizens of Moscow.

The Birth of the New Man was inaugurated in Seville, Spain in 1995, in celebration of the European discovery of the New World by Christopher Columbus.

Tsereteli was elected the President of the Russian Academy of Arts. He founded the Moscow Museum of Modern Art in 1999, becoming the first state museum in the country entirely dedicated to modern and contemporary art.

In 2001, the Gallery of Arts of Tsereteli was opened in Moscow. In 2006, Tsereteli unveiled his monument To the Struggle Against World Terrorism, or The Tear of Grief, in Bayonne, New Jersey. It was donated to the United States as an official gift by Russia in the aftermath of 9/11 attacks to show support and solidarity for the American people. In 2005, Holocaust was donated by Russia to Israel and opened in Jerusalem.

In 2009–10, he was elected a Member of the European Academy of Sciences and Arts (Austria), given the title of Chevalier of the National Order of the Legion of Honor by France, as well as a 1st Rank Order "For Services to the Motherland" by the Russian Federation. In 2011, he received two awards from the Roman Academy of Fine Arts: the "For Life in Art" Prize and the International Giuseppe Sciacca Award for significant contribution to the arts.

In 2012, Tsereteli founded the Museum of Modern Art in Tbilisi, Georgia.

In March 2016, Tsereteli was appointed a UNESCO Goodwill Ambassador.

Tsereteli continued his service as President of the Russian Academy of Arts, organised regular exhibitions by Georgian and international artists at the Museum of Modern Art in Tbilisi, and continued to produce artwork.

On 6 December 2020, Tsereteli was honored the highest state order of Serbia for his contribution of the interior decoration of the Church of Saint Sava in Belgrade, for which the Russian Academy has been the main contractor.

Tsereteli died from a cardiac arrest in his residence in Peredelkino, Moscow Oblast, on 22 April 2025, at the age of 91.

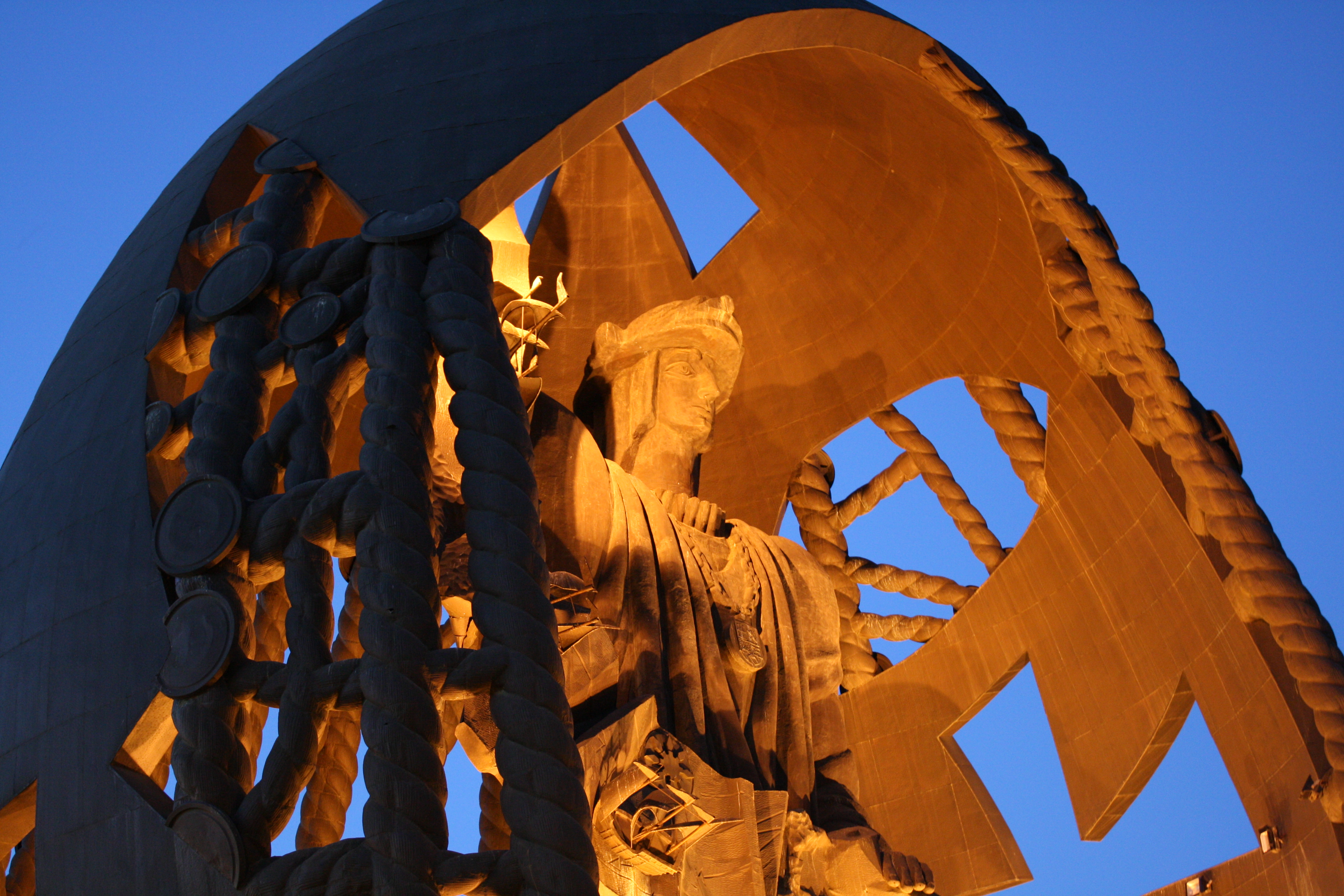
The Birth of a New Man in Seville

== Criticism ==
Critics note the excessive expressiveness and excessive pathos invested in the images of the heroes of Tsereteli's works. They also note the naivety of the sculptural groups on Manezhnaya Square and the mistakes made in the design of Cathedral of Christ the Saviour. Tsereteli's works fit into the aesthetics of postmodernism: eclecticism, kitsch, provocation, and playing with scale.

From the early 1990s, Tsereteli had been supported by Moscow mayor Yuri Luzhkov and effectively became the city's chief muralist. Tsereteli's Moscow works were criticized by city residents and experts, who ranked the sculptor among the expressors of the infamous "Luzhkov style of architecture." The Peter the Great Statue, erected in 1997, sparked especially heated debate.

== Awards ==
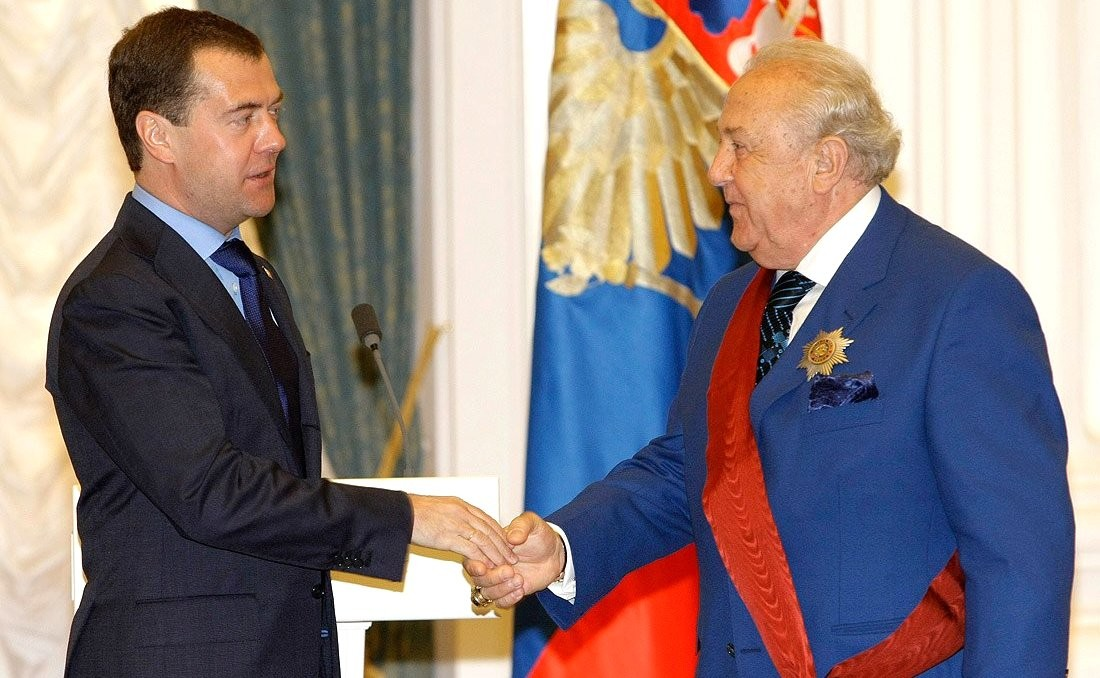
With Dmitry Medvedev, July 2010

Award
Award	Year
Lenin Prize	1976
People's Artist of the Georgian Soviet Socialist Republic	1978
USSR State Prize	1978
People's Artist of the USSR	1979
USSR State Prize	1983
Hero of Socialist Labor	1991
People's Artist of Russia	1993
Knight of the Order of Friendship of Peoples	1994
State Prize of Russia	1996
Order of the Legion of Honor	2010

== Sources ==
- UNESCO participation
- Moscow news: Zurab Disney Or Walt Tsereteli?
- Artnet Magazine, July 10, 2006
- moscow-life.com
