= Islote, Arecibo, Puerto Rico =

Barrio of Puerto Rico

Islote
- Barrio
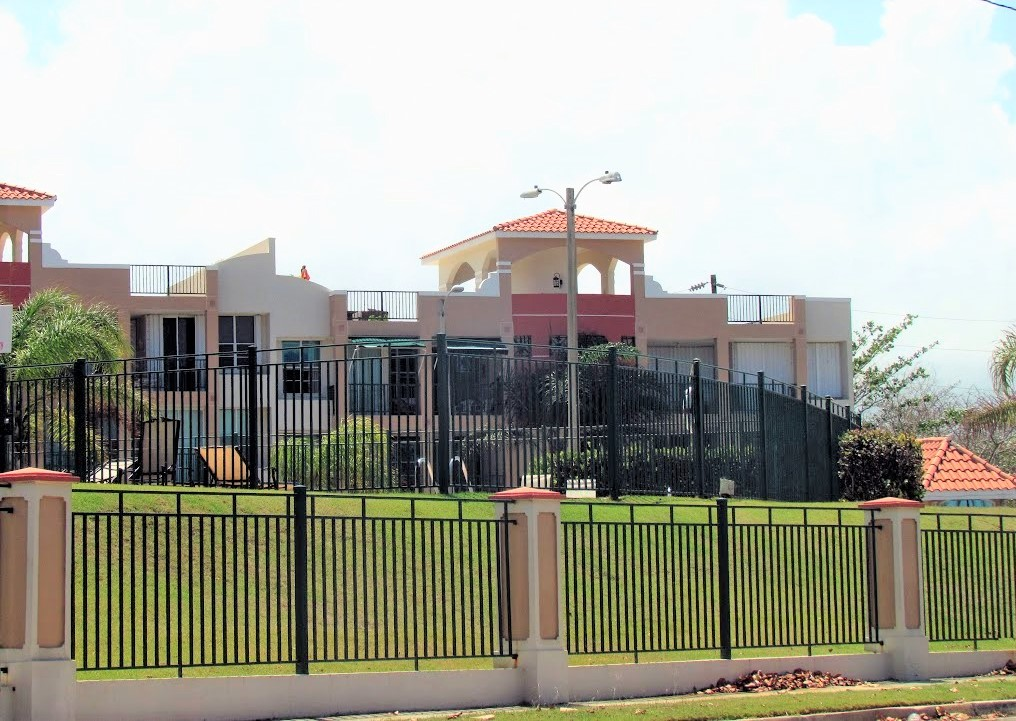
- Townhouses behind wrought iron fences in Islote

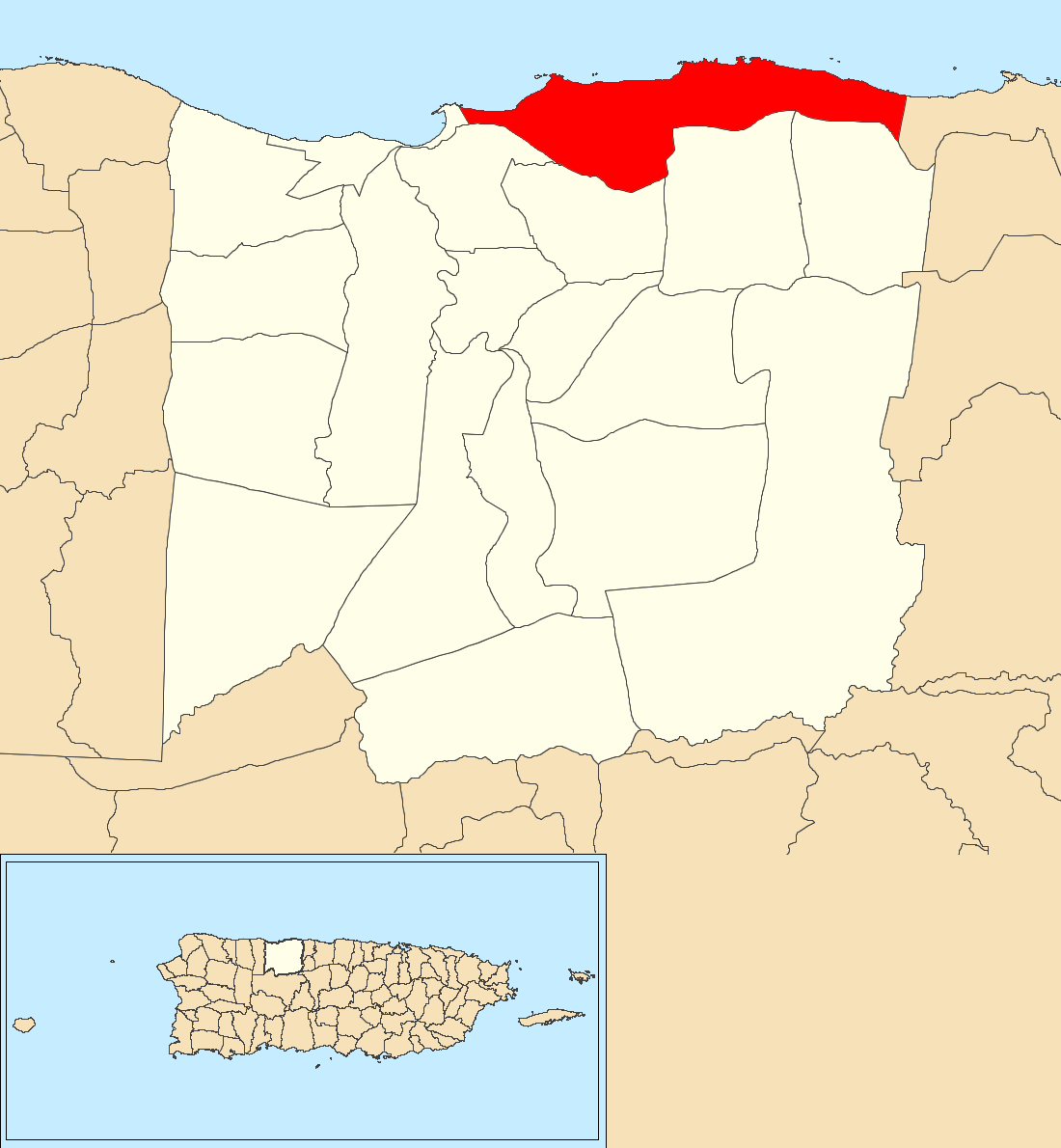
- Location of Islote within the municipality of Arecibo shown in red

- Location of Puerto Rico
- Coordinates: 18°28′54″N 66°38′50″W
- Commonwealth: Puerto Rico
- Municipality: Arecibo

Area
  - Total: 9.63 sq mi (24.9 km^{2})
  - Land: 7.28 sq mi (18.9 km^{2})
  - Water: 2.35 sq mi (6.1 km^{2})
- Elevation: 23 ft (7.0 m)

Population (2010)
  - Total: 5,665
  - Density: 778.2/sq mi (300.5/km^{2})
- Source: 2010 Census
- Time zone: UTC−4 (AST)

Islote is a barrio in the municipality of Arecibo, Puerto Rico. Its population in 2010 was 5,665. "Birth of a New World", a giant sculpture of the explorer Christopher Columbus on a ship, is located in Islote.

== History ==
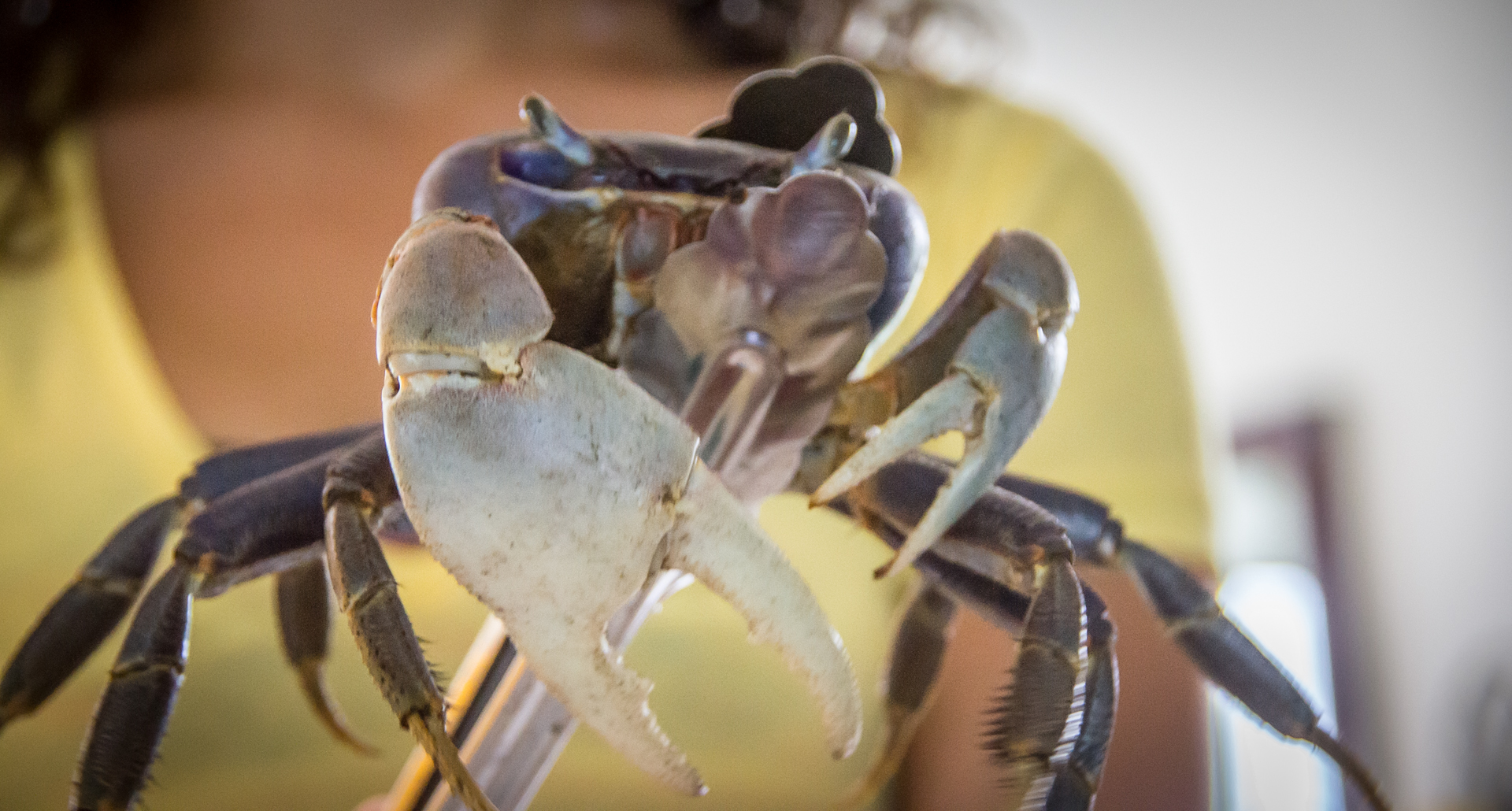
Crab in Islote

Islote was in Spain's gazetteers until Puerto Rico was ceded by Spain in the aftermath of the Spanish–American War under the terms of the Treaty of Paris of 1898 and became an unincorporated territory of the United States. In 1899, the United States Department of War conducted a census of Puerto Rico finding that the population of Islote barrio was 2,498.

Historical population
Census	Pop.	Note	%±
1900	2,498		—
1910	2,908		16.4%
1920	2,917		0.3%
1930	3,106		6.5%
1940	3,562		14.7%
1950	3,110		−12.7%
1960	2,660		−14.5%
1970	2,445		−8.1%
1980	4,458		82.3%
1990	5,785		29.8%
2000	6,080		5.1%
2010	5,665		−6.8%
U.S. Decennial Census; 1899 (shown as 1900) 1910-1930; 1930-1950 1980-2000 2010

== Sectors ==
Barrios (which are, in contemporary times, roughly comparable to minor civil divisions) in turn are further subdivided into smaller local populated place areas/units called sectores (sectors in English). The types of sectores may vary, from normally sector to urbanización to reparto to barriada to residencial, among others.

The following sectors are in Islote barrio:

Callejón del Cristo (Callejón del Diablo), Callejón Francés Apartamentos Oceanía, Comunidad Islote I y II, Comunidad Jarealito, Comunidad Vigía, Condominios Atlántica, Sector Boán, Sector Caracoles, Sector Cueva del Indio, Sector El Callejón, Sector La Vía, Sector Melilla, Sector Pasaje, Sector Piquiña, Sector Rincón Chiquito, Sector Rincón Grande, Sector Vívora, Urbanización Brisas de Palma Roja, Urbanización Brisas del Mar I y II, Urbanización Corales del Mar, Urbanización Costa de Oro, Urbanización Costa del Atlántico, Urbanización Costas del Mar, and Urbanización Reparto Maritza.

== Birth of a New World ==
Birth of the New World, a 360 foot (110 m) bronze sculpture of Christopher Columbus and a ship is located on the Atlantic coastline, in Islote.

== Gallery ==
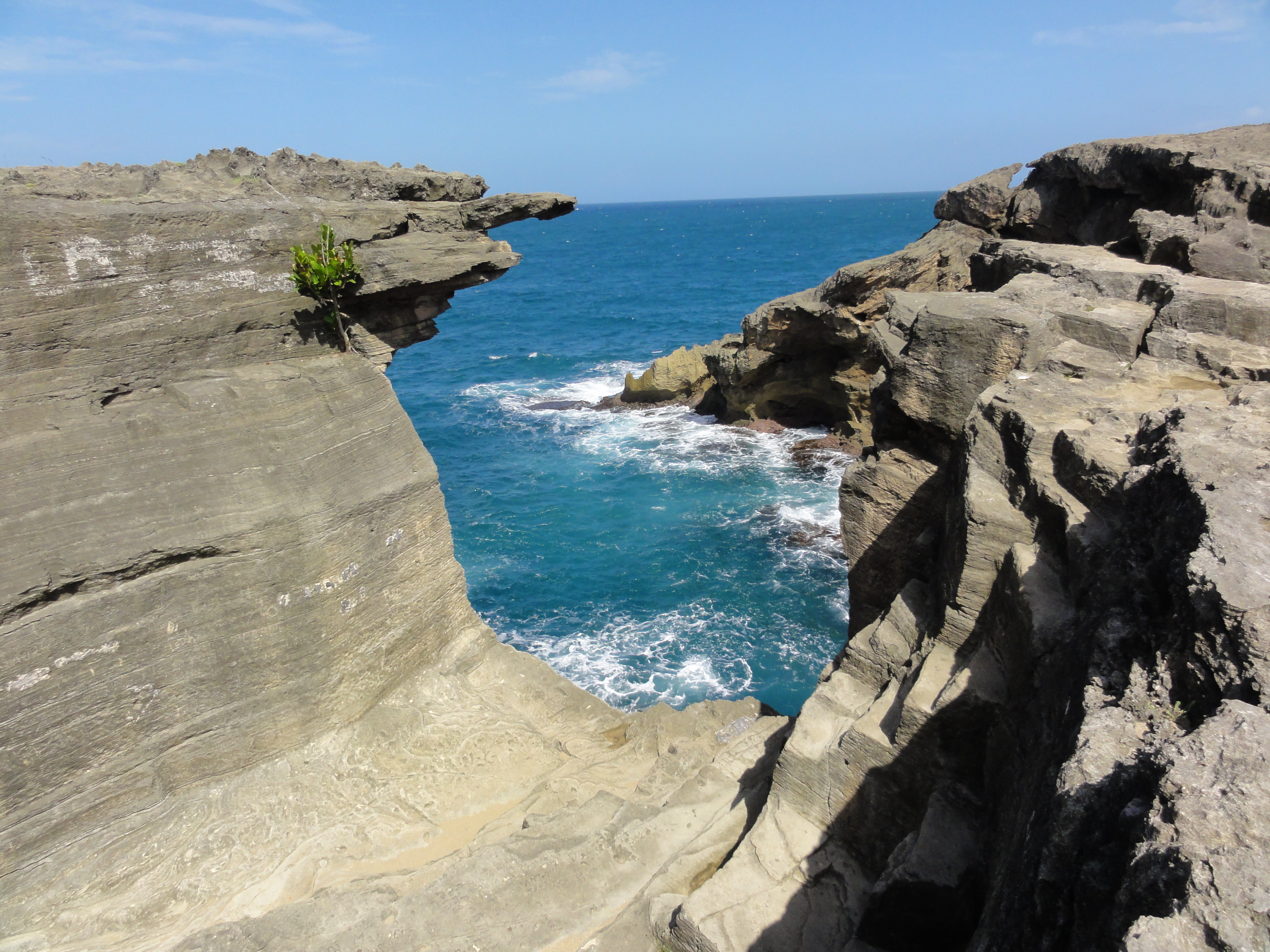
Cueva del Indio

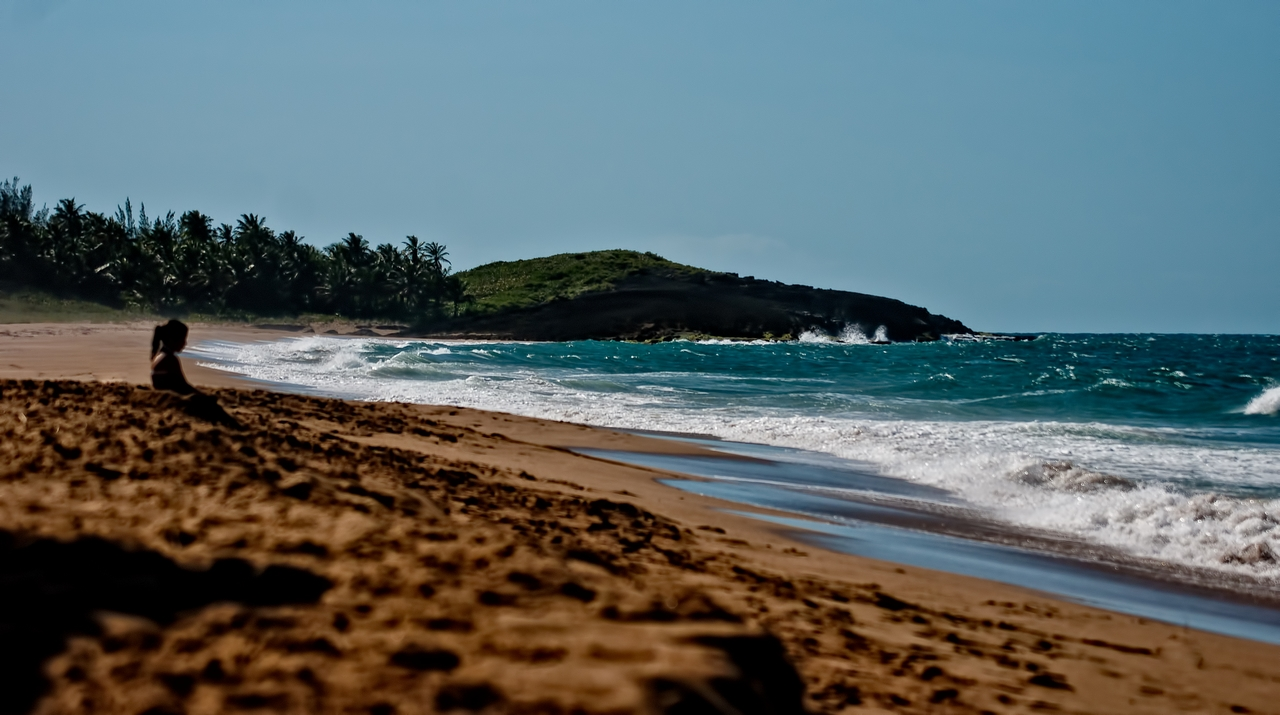
Hallows Beach in Islote

Surfing at Hallows Beach in Arecibo

== See also ==
- List of communities in Puerto Rico
- List of barrios and sectors of Arecibo, Puerto Rico
