= Cueva del Indio (Arecibo) =

Cave on the coast of Islote, Arecibo, Puerto Rico

Coordinates: 18°29′34″N 66°38′30″W

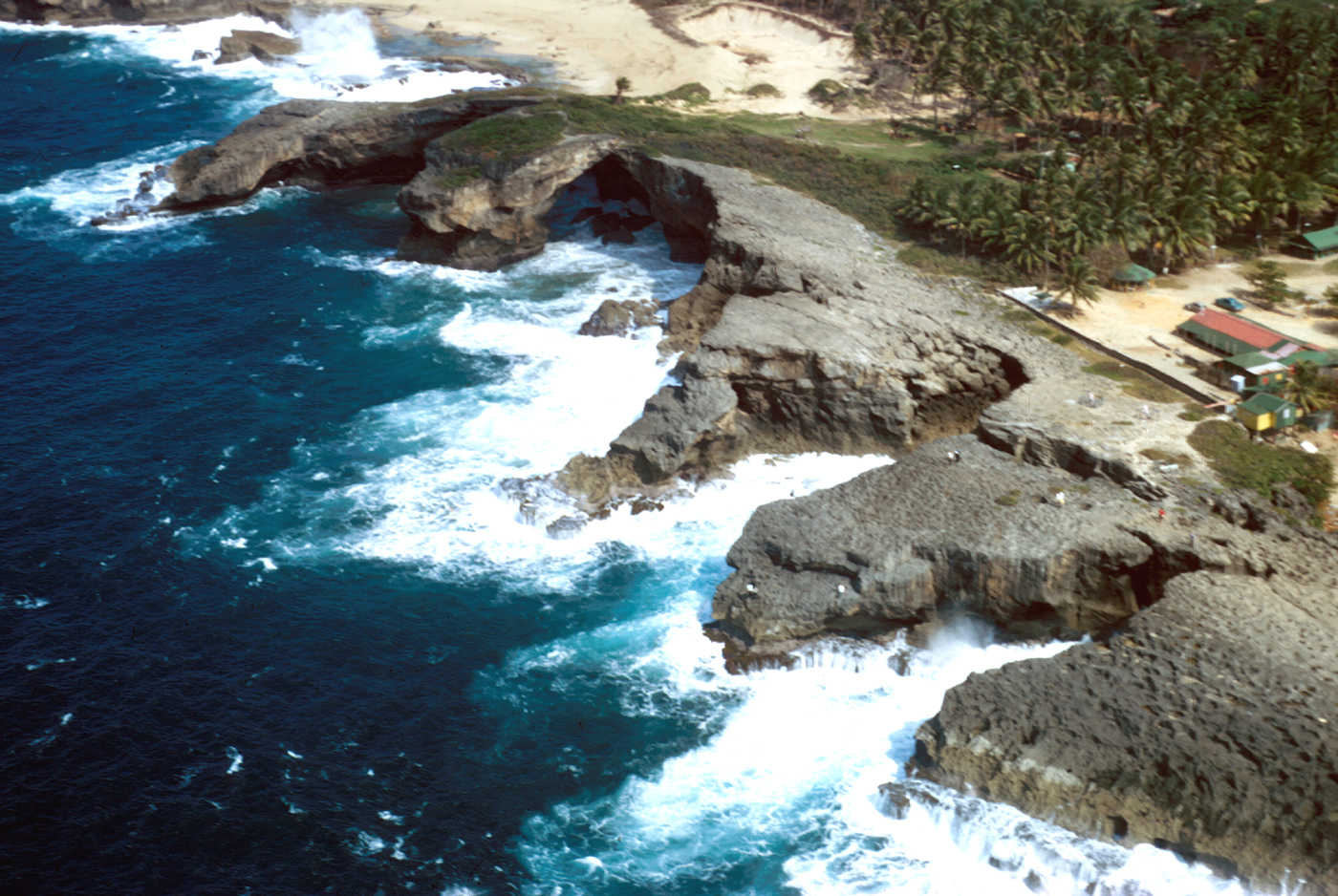
Aerial view of Cueva del Indio

Cueva del Indio (Spanish for "cave of the Indian") is a seaside cave located along limestone cliffs in Islote, Arecibo along Puerto Rico's Atlantic coast. The cave and its surroundings are protected by the Puerto Rico Department of Natural and Environmental Resources (DRNA) as the Cueva del Indio Nature Reserve. The cave gets its name after the numerous petroglyphs created by the Taínos.

== Ecology ==
The marine areas off Cueva del Indio are also protected as part of Cueva del Indio Nature Reserve, particularly the turtlegrass (Thalassia testudinum) meadows which is important for the West Indian manatee and numerous other animal species.

The coastline of Cueva del Indio is notable for its abundance of seabirds, swallows and shorebirds, and, as a component of the Caño Tiburones conservation zone, it was recognized as an Important Bird Area by BirdLife International in 2007.

== Gallery ==
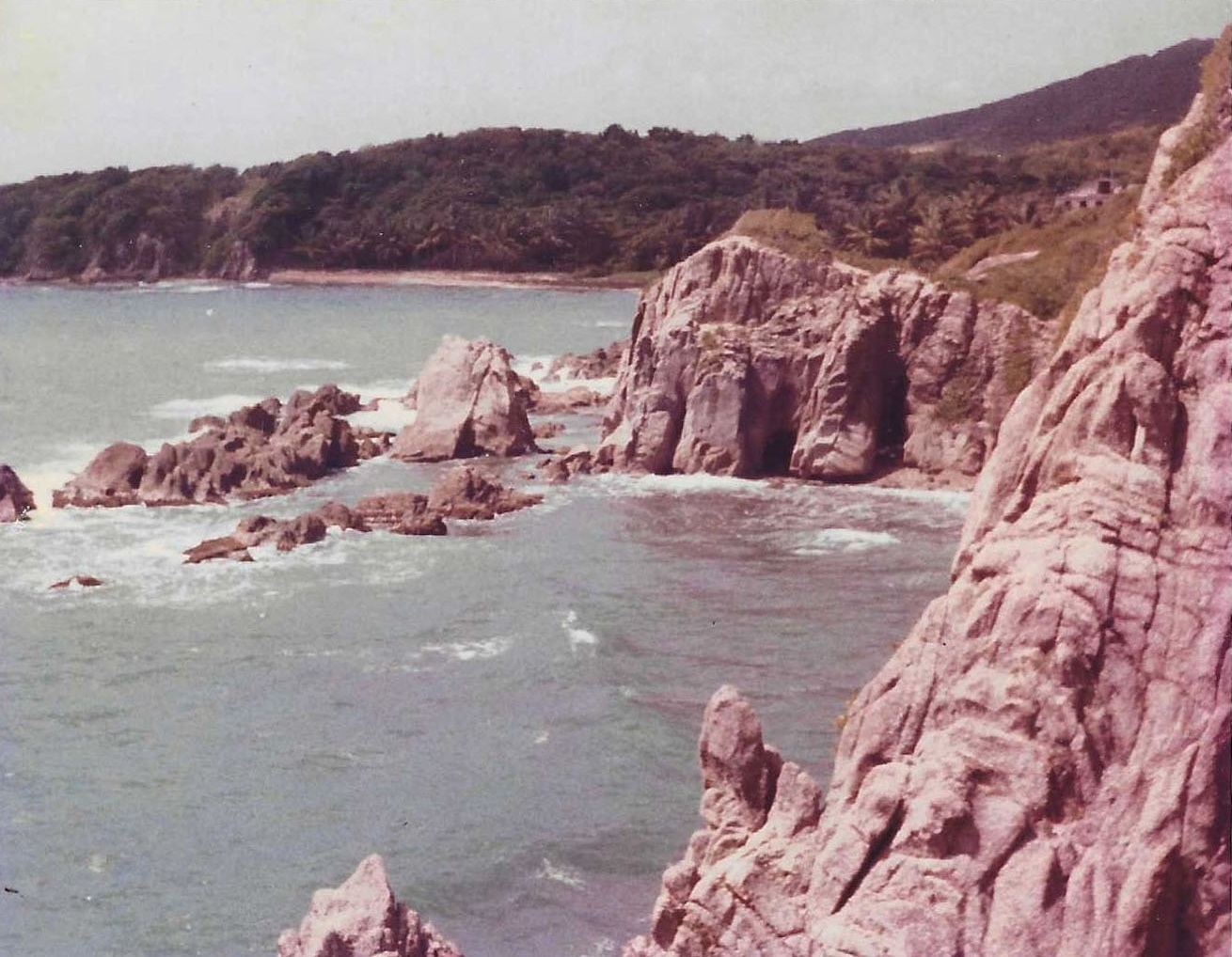

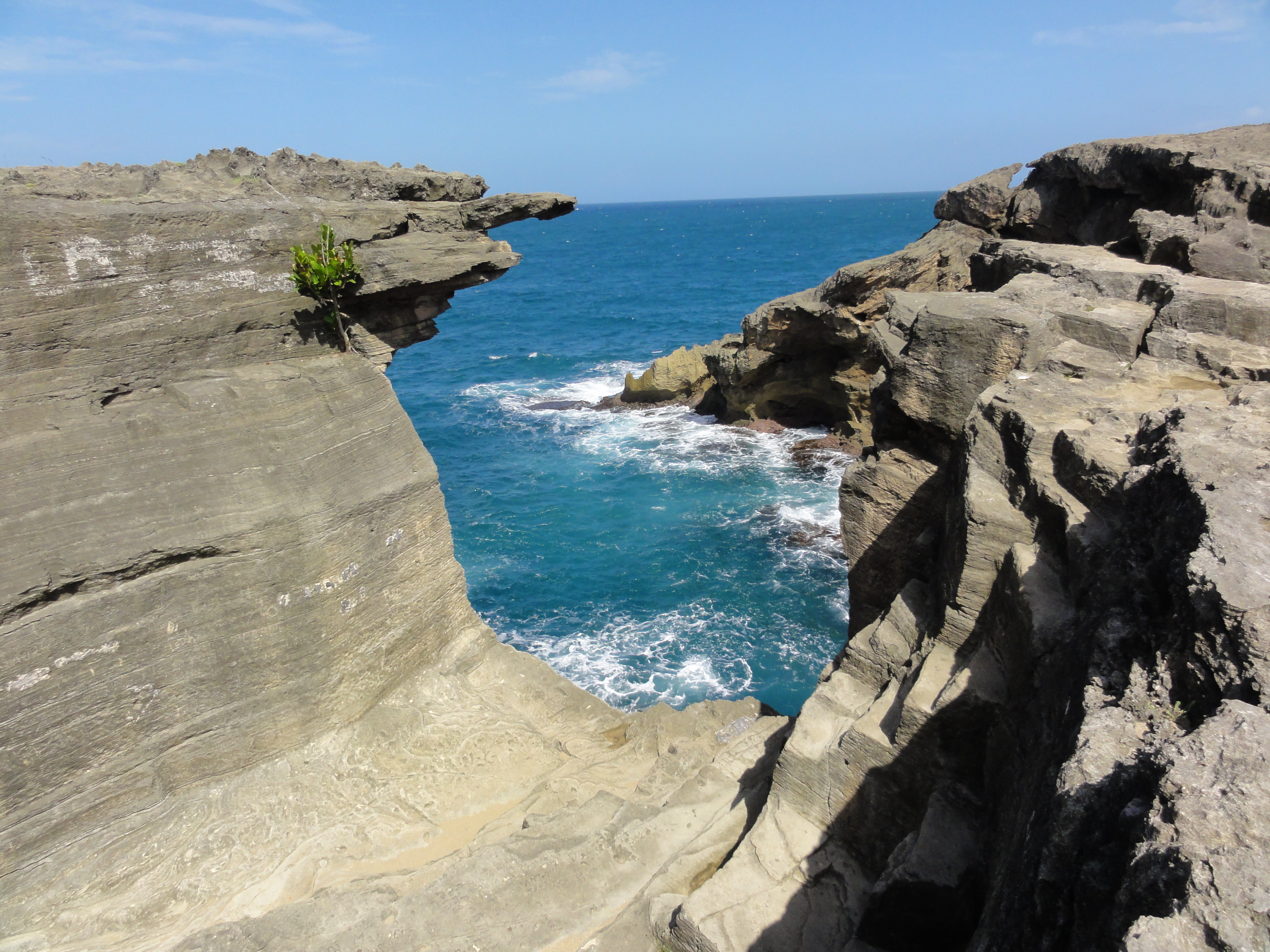
