= Birth of a New Man =

Monument in Seville

- Nacimiento de un hombre nuevo
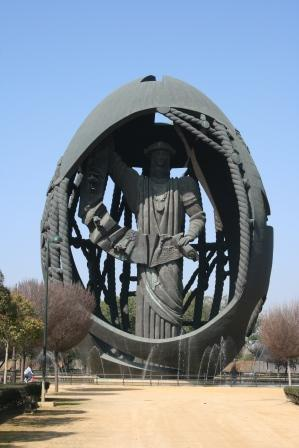
- 37°25′39″N 5°59′34″W
- Location: Seville, Spain
- Designer: Zurab Tsereteli
- Material: Bronze
- Height: 42–45 m
- Weight: 476 t

Birth of a New Man (Spanish: Nacimiento de un Hombre Nuevo), popularly known as el huevo de Colón ("the Columbus' egg"), is a monument in Seville, Spain. It is a work by Zurab Tsereteli, consisting of a colossal statue representing Christopher Columbus partially enfolded by an egg-like shell.

It was a gift from the city of Moscow to Seville on the occasion of the 500th anniversary of the arrival of Columbus in the Caribbean in 1492. The reported height of the sculptural work ranges from 42 to 45 metres (138 to 148 ft), while the individual figure is 32 metres (105 ft) high, thus ranking as the largest statue in Spain, ahead of the Cristo del Otero.

Located at the Park of San Jerónimo, it was inaugurated by Elena de Borbón and Jaime de Marichalar in 1995.

== See also ==
- Birth of the New World
