= Cuevas del Valle =

- municipality
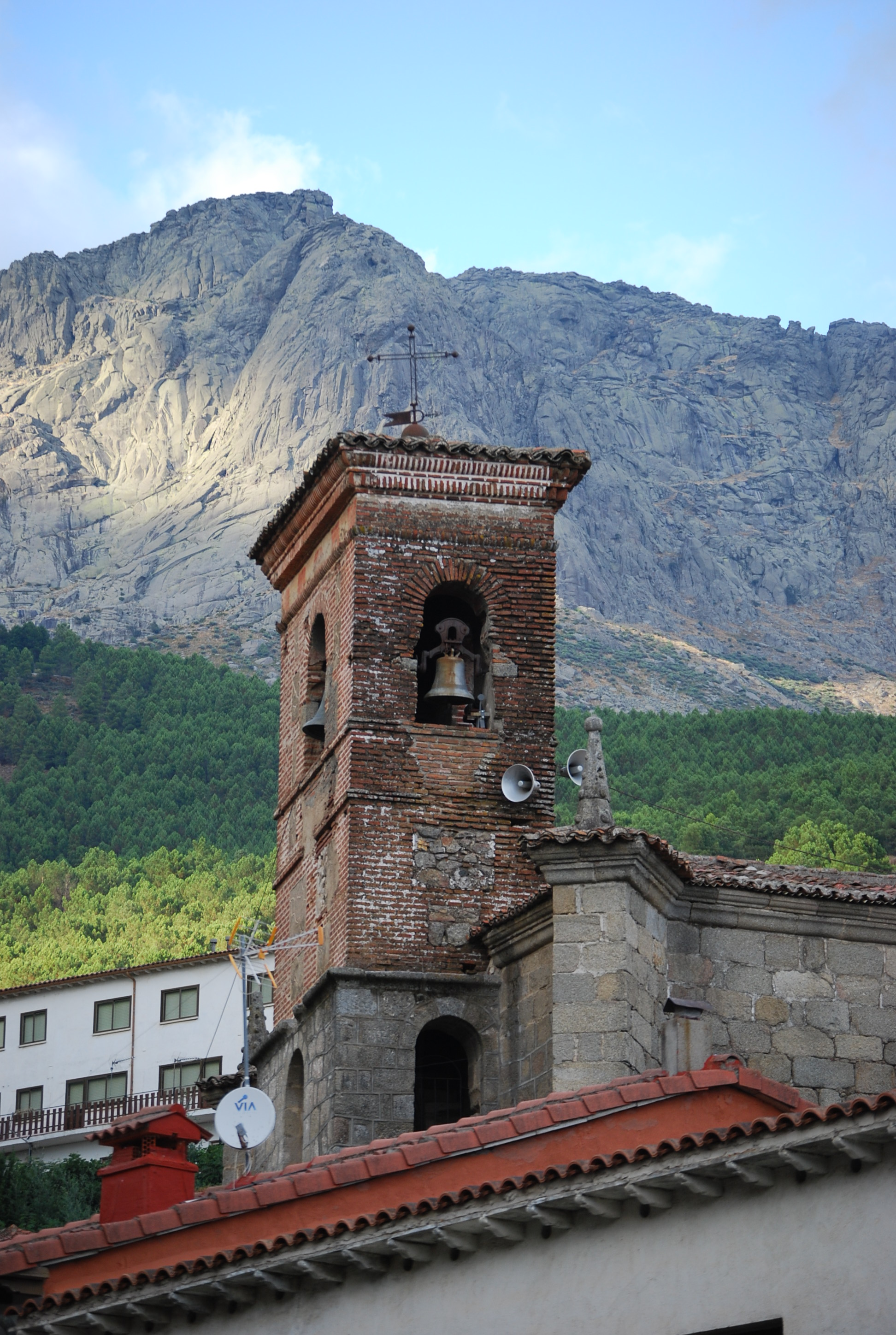
- Tower of the church of Cuevas del Valle, in the background the Sierra de Gredos

- Flag Coat of arms

- Location in Spain. Cuevas del Valle (Spain)
- Coordinates: 40°17′37″N 5°00′32″W
- Country: Spain
- Autonomous community: Castile and León
- Province: Ávila

Area
  - Total: 19 km^{2} (7.3 sq mi)

Population (2025-01-01)
  - Total: 506
  - Density: 27/km^{2} (69/sq mi)
- Time zone: UTC+1 (CET)
  - Summer (DST): UTC+2 (CEST)
- Website: Official website

Cuevas del Valle is a municipality located in the province of Ávila, Castile and León, Spain.

== Population ==
Historical population
Year	Pop.	±% p.a.
2023	508	—
2024	517	+1.77%
2025	506	−2.13%
Source: INE
