= Carlos Cueva Tamariz =

Ecuadorian politician, lawyer and professor

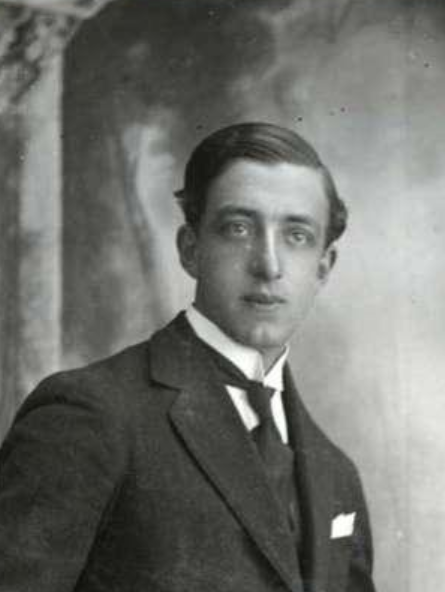

Carlos Cueva Tamariz (November 5, 1898 – April 8, 1991) was an Ecuadorian politician, lawyer and university professor.

== Early life ==
Carlos Cueva was born on November 5, 1898, the first son of Agustín Cueva Muñoz and his wife Domitila Tamariz Larrea in Cuenca. His father was a journalist and politician that later worked at the Azuay Province's Government and at the City Hall of Cuenca.

The family moved to Milagro when he was three, where his father worked as book keeper. 1904 the family returned to Cuenca and Cueva was educated at the catholic elementary school "San José de los HH.CC." Later he went to the "Colegio Seminario" High School until it closed on 1912. Finally, on 1916 he graduated from High School at the "Benigno Malo" after attending one year with a scholarship the Agriculture School of Córdoba.

Cueva attended the University of Cuenca, where he graduated as a lawyer on 1922. As a student, he presided the first Federación de Estudantes Universitarios, the Ecuadorian University Students Association.

== Political and academic life ==
Cueva was appointed on 1917, while still being a college student, as a teacher at the elementary school "Luis Cordero". This was very important for him, then his father had died and he had to support his younger brothers.

His first political function was as Councillor of Cuenca, an office he would have many times in the future. 1924 he was elected as a Congressman for the Azuay Province. In 1925 he was elected for a second period as a Councillor of Cuenca and on the same year he was appointed school principal of his old high school. Three years later he changed as a Director to the Board of Education of Azuay until 1932.

There was a calling for elections for a new constitution on 1928 and Cueva Tamaríz won a sit at the Constitutional Convention 1929.

He was elected as a Congressman on 1931 for the third time and 1932 he co-founded the Ecuadorian Socialist Party. The same year Cueva was appointed Secretary of the Interior under President Luis Larrea Alba, but he rejected to continue in charge under President Alfredo Baquerizo that followed him. He was nevertheless reelected as Director of the Educational Board of Azuay on the same year.

Cueva was appointed a professor at his alma mater on 1935, where he taught Law History and Labour Law. Three years later he was elected as a Congressman for the fourth time after he rejected being proposed as President of Ecuador for the Socialist Party. The reason was that Cueva thought that a Socialist President would be overthrown and there would be again a dictatorship in the country.

1943 he left the Socialist Party and became a member of the Acción Democrática Ecuatoriana Party. One year later he was elected as a Congressman for the fifth time and as such he directed the Constitutional Convention of 1945. He wrote Article 148 about worker's rights. The same year he was appointed Rector of the University of Cuenca.

As Councillor of Cuenca he did on 1945 the telephone wiring in Cuenca and the next year he founded the Casa de la Cultura Núcleo del Azuay, which he also directed until 1970.

He was Secretary of Education under President Galo Plaza Lasso in 1951 and 1964 he was a member of the Ecuadorian Delegation to the United Nations General Assembly. Two years later he was again proposed as President of Ecuador, but he rejected it again and Clemente Yerovi was then elected. 1966 he won a sit at the elections for the Constitutional Convention of 1966 and a year later he was appointed as Ambassador of Ecuador at the United Nations. 1975 he was appointed once more as rector of the University of Cuenca and was 1979 honored with an appointment for life.

== Personal life ==
He married Rosa Esther Jaramillo Montesinos in 1922, a native of Cuenca as well. They became seven children: Mariano, Patricio, Juan, Cecilia, Alicia, Beatriz y María. His daughter-in-law was the prima ballerina Noralma Vera Arrata. His grandson Fernando Cordero Cueva was mayor of Cuenca (1996–2004), dean at the University of Cuenca, congressman and a former president of the Ecuadorian National Assembly. His grandson Juan Martín Cueva is a documentary film director.

== Trivia ==
- There were three services after his dead (Universidad de Cuenca, Casa de la Cultura Núcleo del Azuay and City Hall) because of the prestige he had among the people.
- He was part of all Constitutional Conventions in Ecuador between 1928 and 1967.
- He donated his personal library to the University of Cuenca.
- The theater of the city of Cuenca is named after him, also a main avenue and a monument in the same city.
- In Guayaquil the Carlos Cueva Tamariz road is in Urdesa Central
- His son Juan, also a diplomat, was also Ambassador of Ecuador at a United Nations Organization, the Unesco.
- There are two schools named after him in Guayas Province and Azuay Province.
- The University of Cuenca published the book A cien años de su nacimiento on 1998.
- Ecuador published a postage stamp on his honor on 1998.

== Publications ==
- Essay (1936): Alrededor de la situación internacional
- Book (1954): Jurisprudencia ecuatoriana del trabajo
- Essay (1964): El Estado patrono
- Anthology (1964): En torno a la Universidad
