= Elvira Cuevas =

Puerto Rican ecologist

- Born: August 20, 1950 (age 76); San Juan, Puerto Rico, U.S.
- Education: University of Puerto Rico, Río Piedras Campus (B.S., M.S.); Venezuelan Institute for Scientific Research (Ph.D.)
- Children: 1
- Awards: Guggenheim Fellowship (2000)
- Scientific career
- Fields: Tropical ecology, ecophysiology
- Workplaces: University of Puerto Rico, Río Piedras Campus
- Thesis: Crecimiento de raices finas y su relacion con los procesos de descomposicion de materia organica y liberacion de nutrientes en bosques del alto Rio Negro en el territorio federal Amazonas (1983)

Elvira Cuevas Viera is a Puerto Rican ecologist. She is a professor in the department of biology at University of Puerto Rico, Río Piedras Campus where she serves as director of the Center for Applied Tropical Ecology and Conservation.

== Early life and education ==
Cuevas was born on August 20, 1950, in San Juan, Puerto Rico. She became interested in science at a young age and originally planned to go into medicine. She switched gears and decided to move to focus on ecology after taking an ecology course under Herminio Lugo Lugo at the University of Puerto Rico, Río Piedras Campus (UPR-RP). She graduated with a bachelor's and master's degrees in biology at UPR-RP. Her 1975 master's thesis was titled Changes in selected water quality parameters as influenced by land use patterns in the Espiritu Santo drainage basin. Cuevas completed a Ph.D. in ecology at the Venezuelan Institute for Scientific Research (IVIC) in 1984. She was the first graduate in the field of ecology at IVIC in Venezuela. Her dissertation was titled Crecimiento de raices finas y su relacion con los procesos de descomposicion de materia organica y liberacion de nutrientes en bosques del alto Rio Negro en el territorio federal Amazonas. She was a postdoctoral fellow with the International Institute of Tropical Forestry.

== Career ==
Cuevas lived and worked in Venezuela for 25 years. In 2001, she joined the faculty at UPR-RP where she is a professor in the department of biology. She is the director of the Center for Applied Tropical Ecology and Conservation at UPR-RP. In May 2004, Cuevas became an adjunct faculty member in the department of management and conservation of natural resources in the faculty of veterinary and zootechnology at the Universidad Autónoma de Yucatán.

=== Research ===
Cuevas researches ecosystem ecology, the processes and function of ecosystems, plant-soil interactions, nutrient cycling, and the carbon cycle. She also investigates the eco-hydrology of semi-arid systems and urban wetlands. Cuevas researches the ecophysiological responses of plants to climate change, climate variability, and heavy metal pollution in urban wetlands. She uses natural stable isotope technology to identify sources of water and carbon in the soil and evaluate plants' responses to water and nutrient availability. Cuevas measures rainfall, amount of moisture in soil and soil temperatures to research how plants interact with their environment.

== Awards and honors ==
In 2000, Cuevas was awarded a Guggenheim Fellowship to study plant sciences. In 2019, she became the first Puerto Rican woman named to the Latin American Academy of Science.

== Personal life ==
Cuevas is married and has a son. Both her husband and son are scientists.

== Selected publications ==
Cuevas' most cited publications include:

- Tiessen, H., Cuevas, E., & Chacon, P. (1994). The role of soil organic matter in sustaining soil fertility. Nature, 371(6500), 783–785.
- Martinelli, L. A., Piccolo, M. C., Townsend, A. R., Vitousek, P. M., Cuevas, E., McDowell, W., ... & Treseder, K. (1999). Nitrogen stable isotopic composition of leaves and soil: tropical versus temperate forests. Biogeochemistry, 46(1–3), 45–65.
- Tanner, E. V. J., Vitousek, P. A., & Cuevas, E. (1998). Experimental investigation of nutrient limitation of forest growth on wet tropical mountains. Ecology, 79(1), 10–22.
- Myers, R. J. K., Palm, C. A., Cuevas, E., Gunatilleke, I. U. N., & Brossard, M. (1994). The synchronisation of nutrient mineralisation and plant nutrient demand.
- Cuevas, E., & Medina, E. (1988). Nutrient dynamics within Amazonian forests. Oecologia, 76(2), 222–235.
