= Navares de las Cuevas =

- Municipality
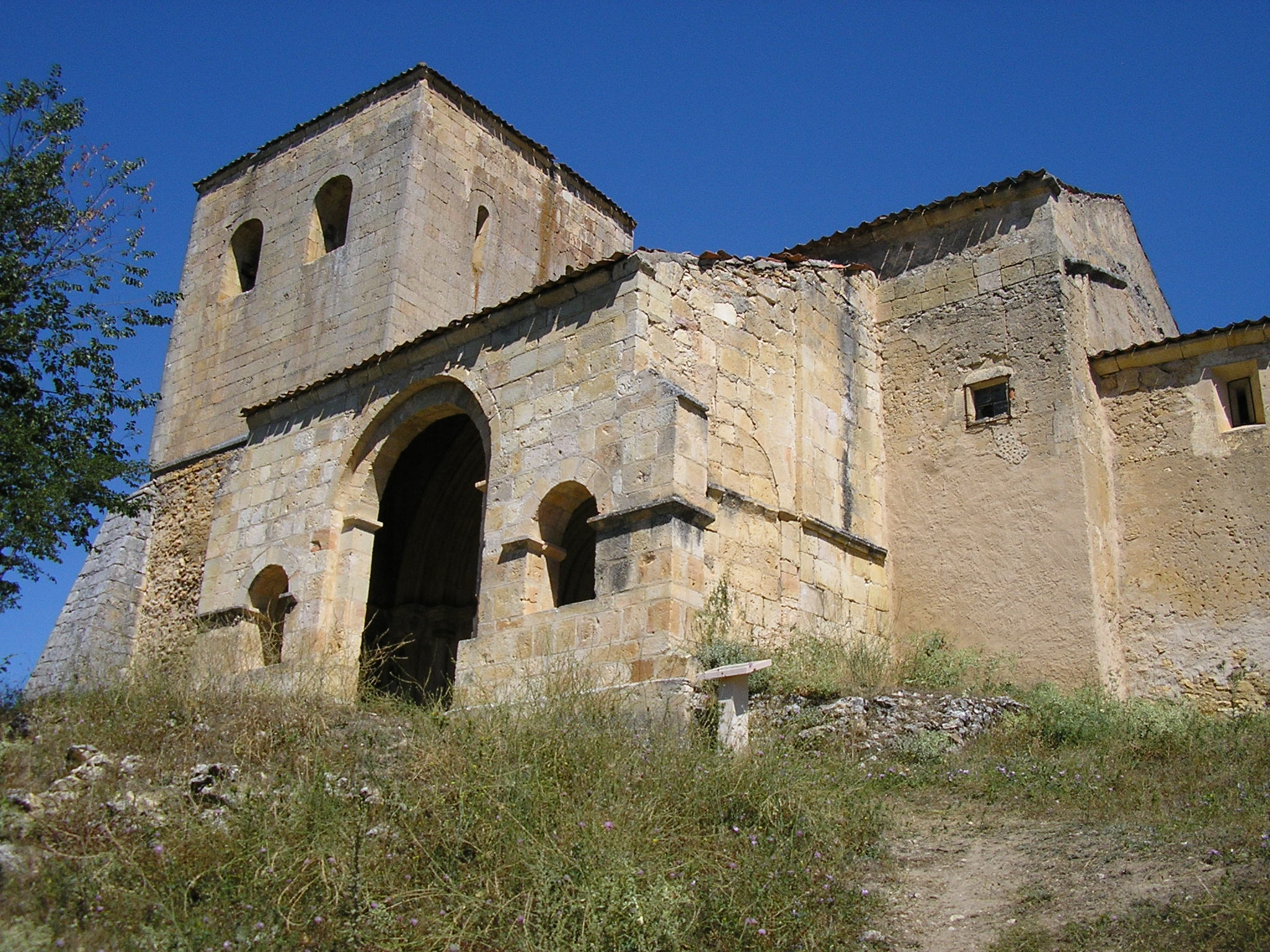
- Navares de las Cuevas - Hermitage of the Virgen del Barrio

- Location in Spain. Navares de las Cuevas (Spain)
- Coordinates: 41°24′51″N 3°45′02″W
- Country: Spain
- Autonomous community: Castile and León
- Province: Segovia
- Municipality: Navares de las Cuevas

Area
  - Total: 18 km^{2} (6.9 sq mi)

Population (2025-01-01)
  - Total: 22
  - Density: 1.2/km^{2} (3.2/sq mi)
- Time zone: UTC+1 (CET)
  - Summer (DST): UTC+2 (CEST)
- Website: Official website

Navares de las Cuevas is a municipality located in the province of Segovia, Castile and León, Spain. According to the 2004 census (INE), the municipality has a population of 31 inhabitants.

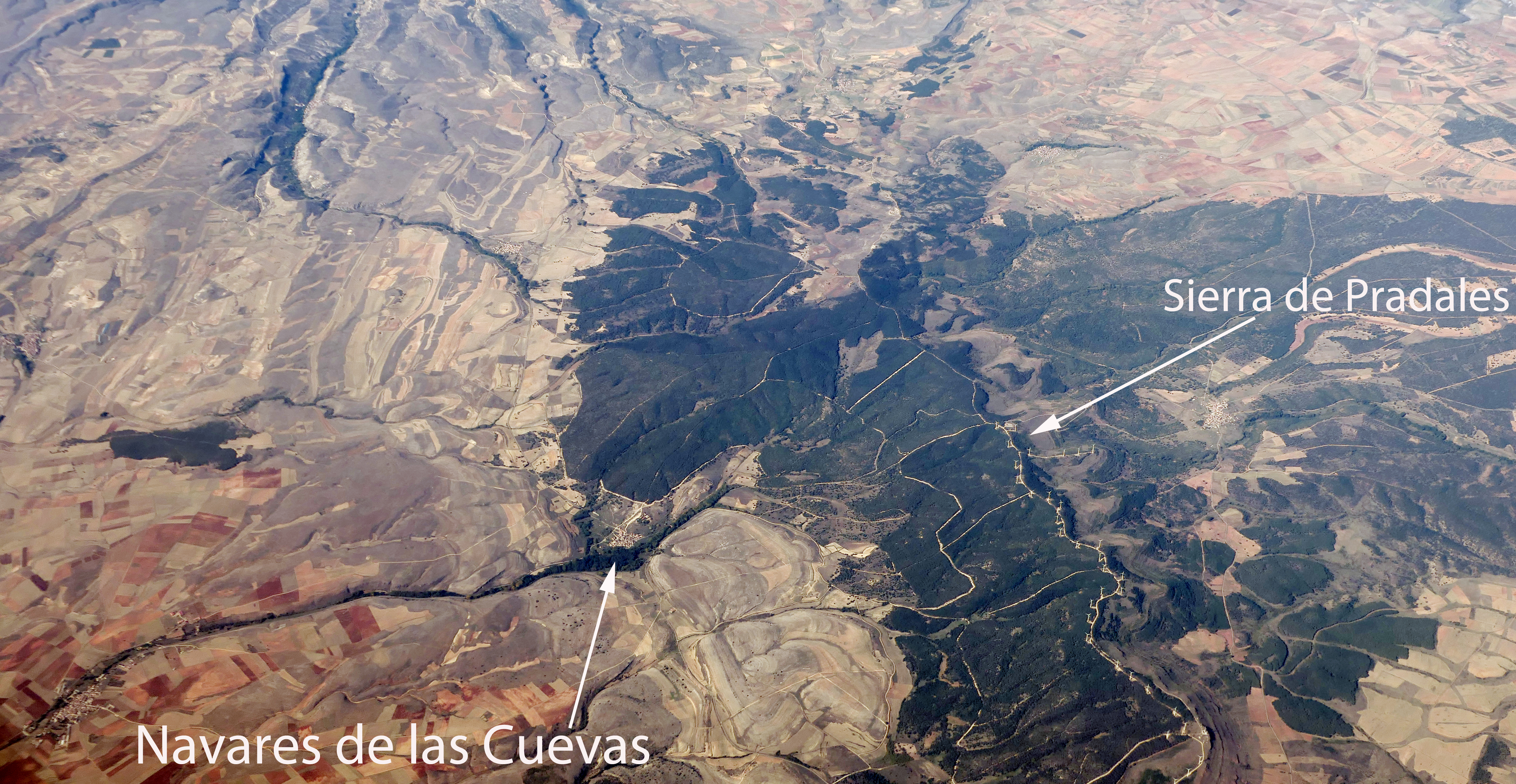
An aerial view of Navares de las Cuevas and the Sierra de Pradales.
