= Cuevas de Provanco =

- Municipality
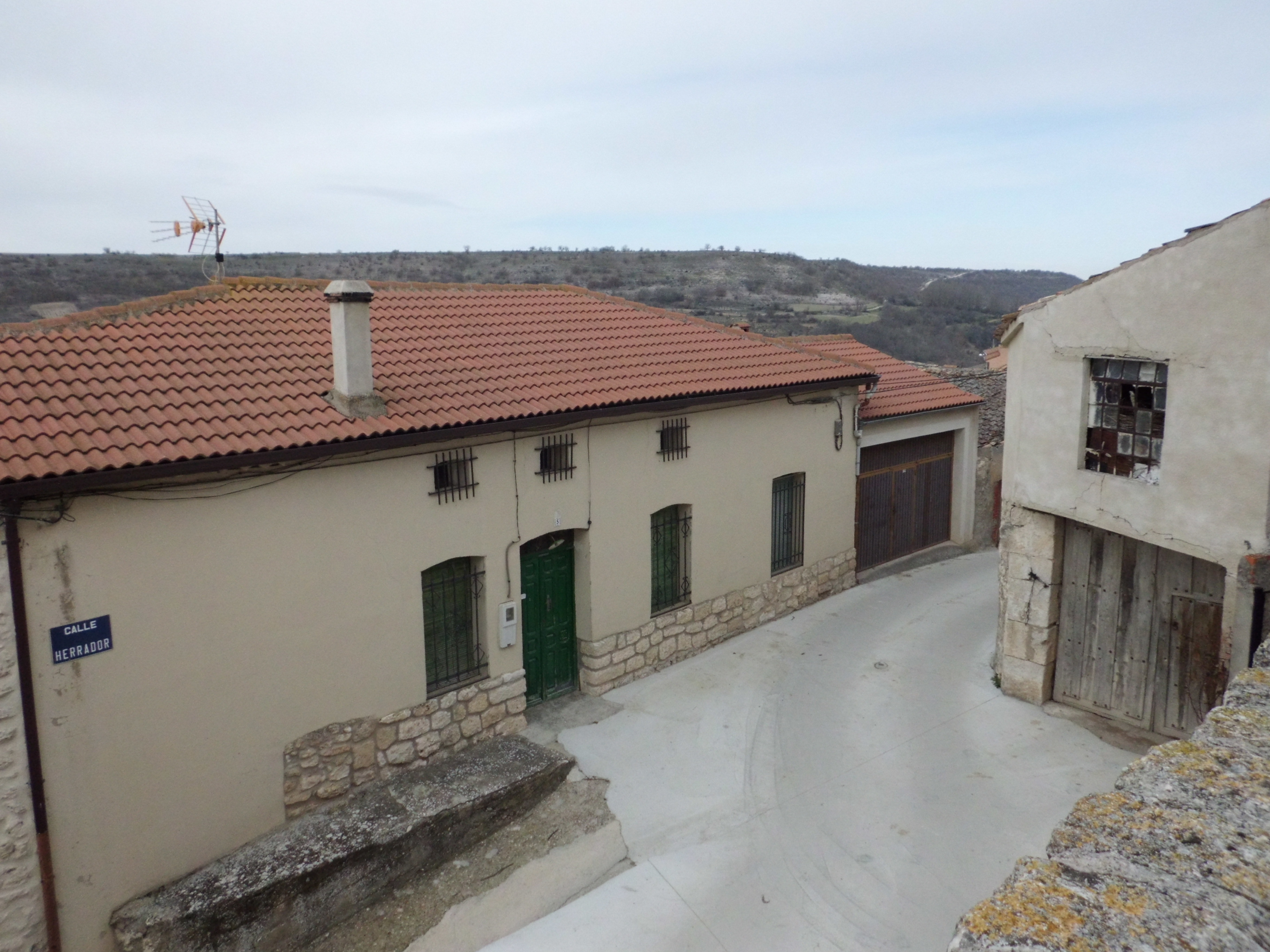
- View of the street of Cuevas de Provanco from the lou church

- Location in Spain. Cuevas de Provanco (Spain)
- Coordinates: 41°32′32″N 3°57′44″W
- Country: Spain
- Autonomous community: Castile and León
- Province: Segovia
- Municipality: Cuevas de Provanco

Area
  - Total: 38 km^{2} (15 sq mi)

Population (2025-01-01)
  - Total: 131
  - Density: 3.4/km^{2} (8.9/sq mi)
- Time zone: UTC+1 (CET)
  - Summer (DST): UTC+2 (CEST)
- Website: Official website

Cuevas de Provanco is a municipality located in the province of Segovia, Castile and León, Spain. According to the 2004 census (INE), the municipality has a population of 179 inhabitants.
