= Patricio Cueva Jaramillo =

- Born: 28 December 1928; Cuenca, Ecuador
- Died: 19 May 2010 (aged 81)
- Education: Economics and political science
- Known for: Painting, journalism
- Spouse: Noralma Vera Arrata (divorced)
- Parents: Carlos Cueva Tamaríz (father); Rosa Esther Jaramillo Montesinos (mother)
- Relatives: Juan Cueva Jaramillo (brother)

Patricio Cueva Jaramillo (28 December 1928 – 19 May 2010) was a Latin American painter and journalist.

Cueva was born in Cuenca. He was the second son of Carlos Cueva Tamaríz (1898–1991) and his wife Rosa Esther Jaramillo Montesinos. Cueva's family was middle-class; nevertheless his father was a distinguished politician and professor at the University of Cuenca. His youngest brother, Juan Cueva Jaramillo, was also a politician and diplomat.

He studied economics and political science in Paris and Prague in the late 1940s and early 1950s and later married and divorced the Ecuadorian ballet dancer Noralma Vera Arrata. He worked in Cuba as a journalist at the Granma where he met the young Gabriel García Marquez.

As a painter, the ecuadorian landscape was his most recurrent theme. His latest exhibition was in Quito, in the cultural centre of the Alliance française in July 2007. Although a close friend of the painter Eduardo Kingman and his brother Nicolas, Cueva's work is not influenced by Kingman's famous Expressionist hands. They worked together at the Caspicara Gallery in Quito.

== See also ==
- La Hora
