= Hato Arriba, Arecibo, Puerto Rico =

Barrio of Puerto Rico

Hato Arriba
- Barrio
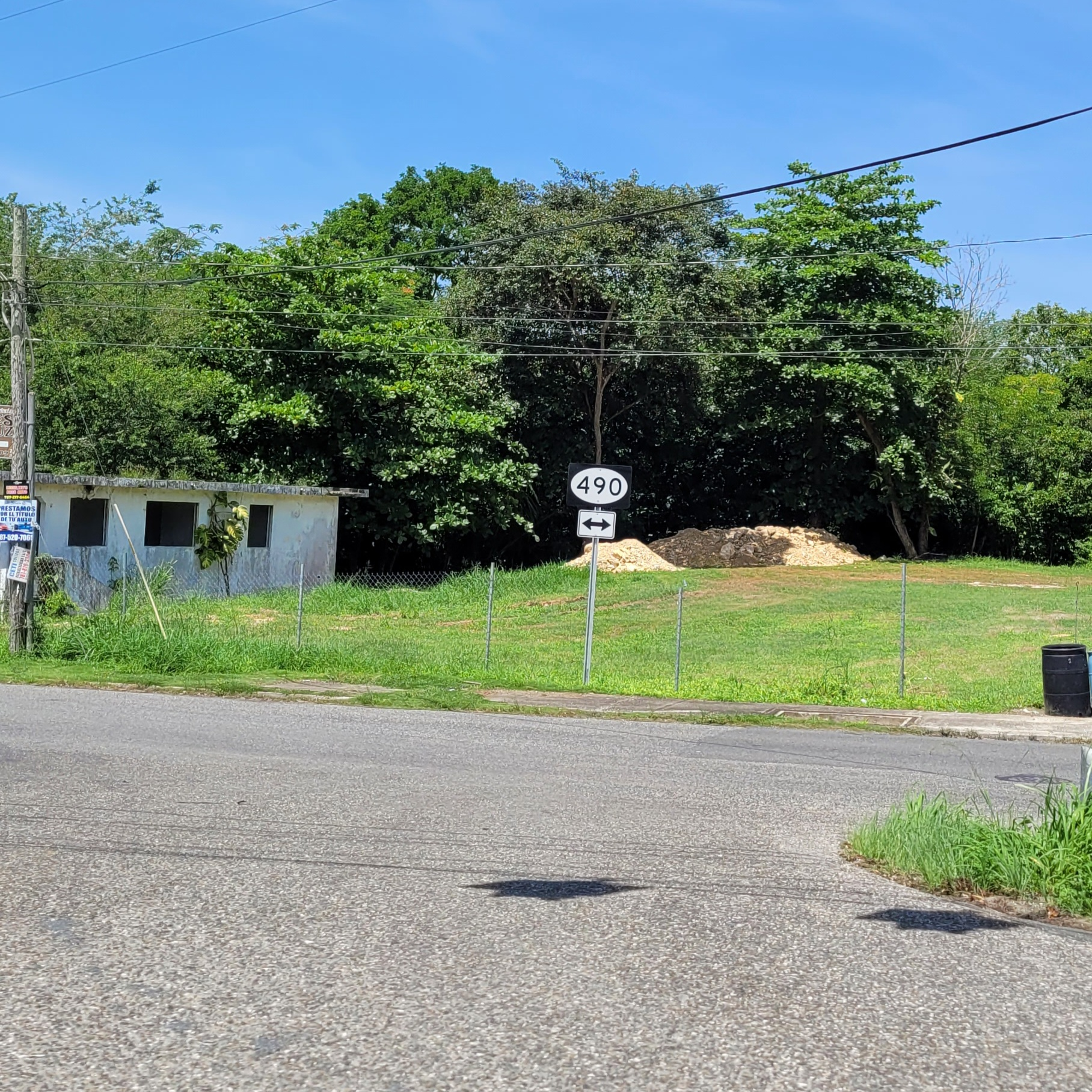
- Puerto Rico Highway 490 in Hato Arriba

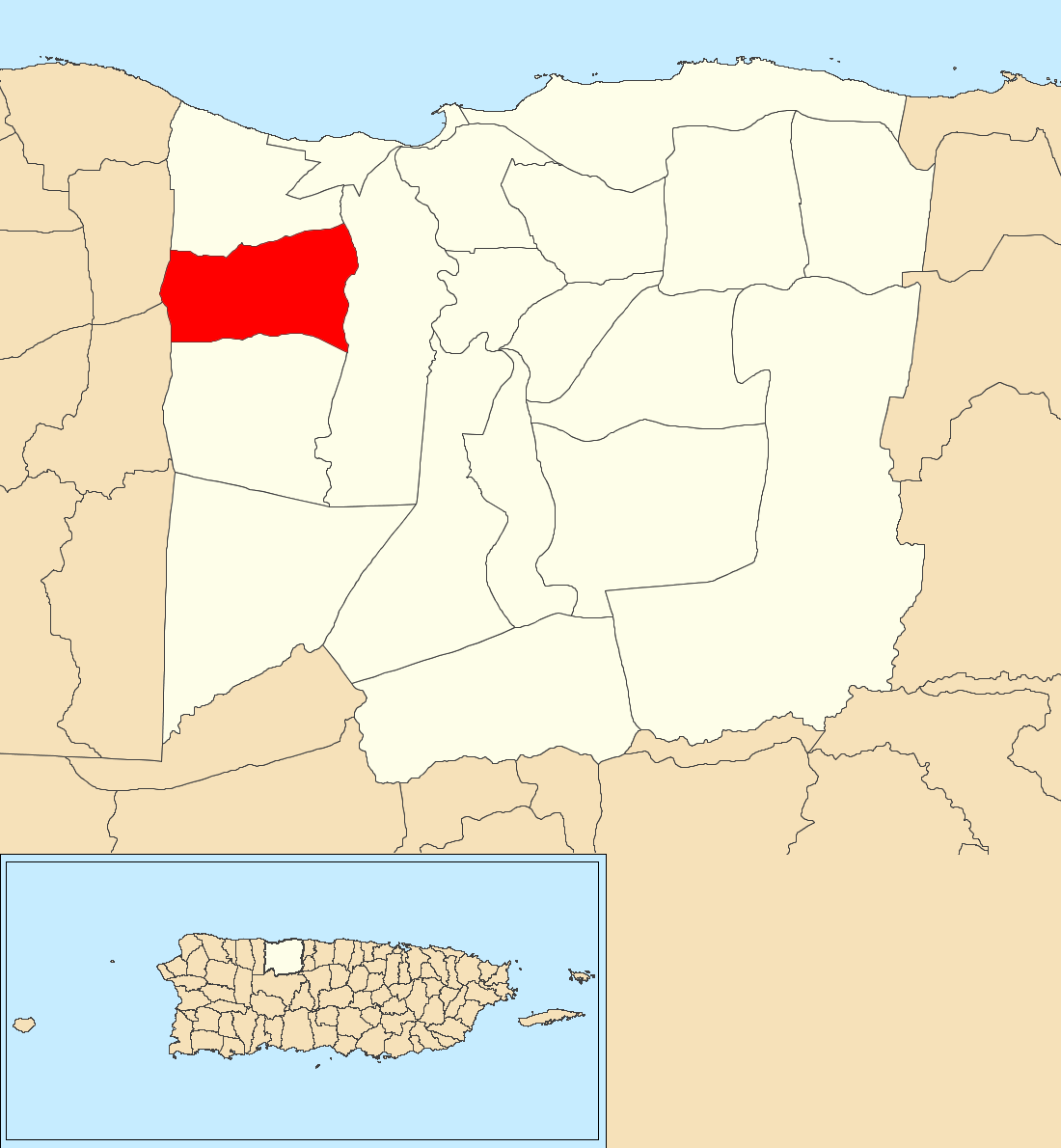
- Location of Hato Arriba within the municipality of Arecibo shown in red

- Location of Puerto Rico
- Coordinates: 18°26′13″N 66°44′43″W
- Commonwealth: Puerto Rico
- Municipality: Arecibo

Area
  - Total: 4.81 sq mi (12.5 km^{2})
  - Land: 4.81 sq mi (12.5 km^{2})
  - Water: 0.00 sq mi (0 km^{2})
- Elevation: 292 ft (89 m)

Population (2010)
  - Total: 8,495
  - Density: 1,766.1/sq mi (681.9/km^{2})
- Source: 2010 Census
- Time zone: UTC−4 (AST)

Hato Arriba is a barrio in the municipality of Arecibo, Puerto Rico. Its population in 2010 was 8,495.

== History ==
Hato Arriba was in Spain's gazetteers until Puerto Rico was ceded by Spain in the aftermath of the Spanish–American War under the terms of the Treaty of Paris of 1898 and became an unincorporated territory of the United States. In 1899, the United States Department of War conducted a census of Puerto Rico finding that the population of Hato Arriba barrio was 1,751.

Historical population
Census	Pop.	Note	%±
1900	1,751		—
1910	1,746		−0.3%
1920	2,317		32.7%
1930	2,756		18.9%
1940	2,821		2.4%
1950	3,137		11.2%
1960	4,326		37.9%
1970	0		−100.0%
1980	5,803		—
1990	7,185		23.8%
2000	7,947		10.6%
2010	8,495		6.9%
U.S. Decennial Census; 1899 (shown as 1900) 1910-1930; 1930-1950 1980-2000 2010

== Sectors ==
Barrios (which are, in contemporary times, roughly comparable to minor civil divisions) in turn are further subdivided into smaller local populated place areas/units called sectores (sectors in English). The types of sectores may vary, from normally sector to urbanización to reparto to barriada to residencial, among others.

The following sectors are in Hato Arriba barrio:

Parcelas Navas, Sector Corea, Sector Juncos, Sector Las Cunetas, Urbanización El Monte, Urbanización Las Brisas, Urbanización Paseo Los Ángeles, and Urbanización San Felipe.

== See also ==
- List of communities in Puerto Rico
- List of barrios and sectors of Arecibo, Puerto Rico
