= Santana, Arecibo, Puerto Rico =

Barrio of Puerto Rico

Santana
- Barrio
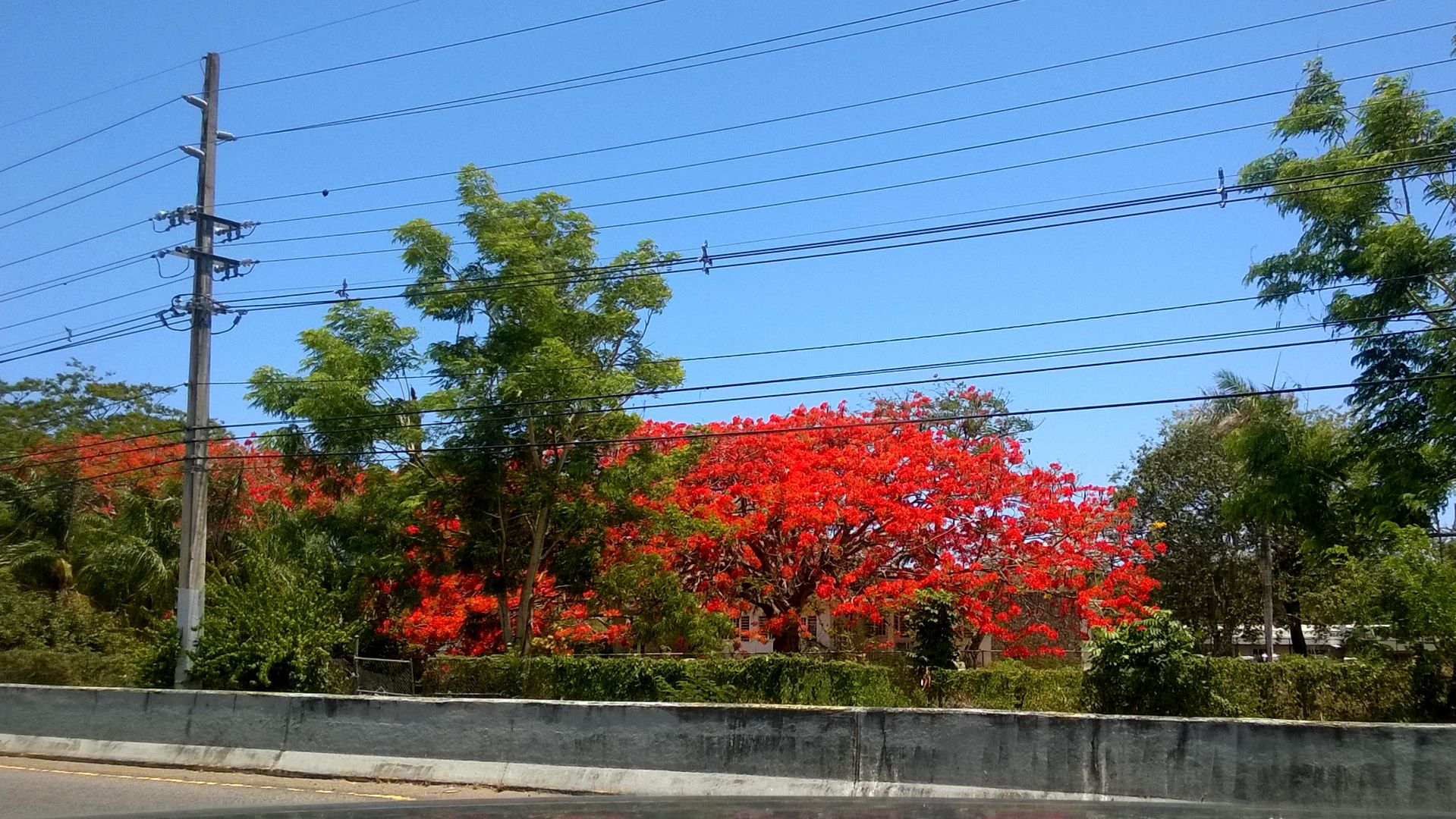
- Flowered flamboyant trees in Santana

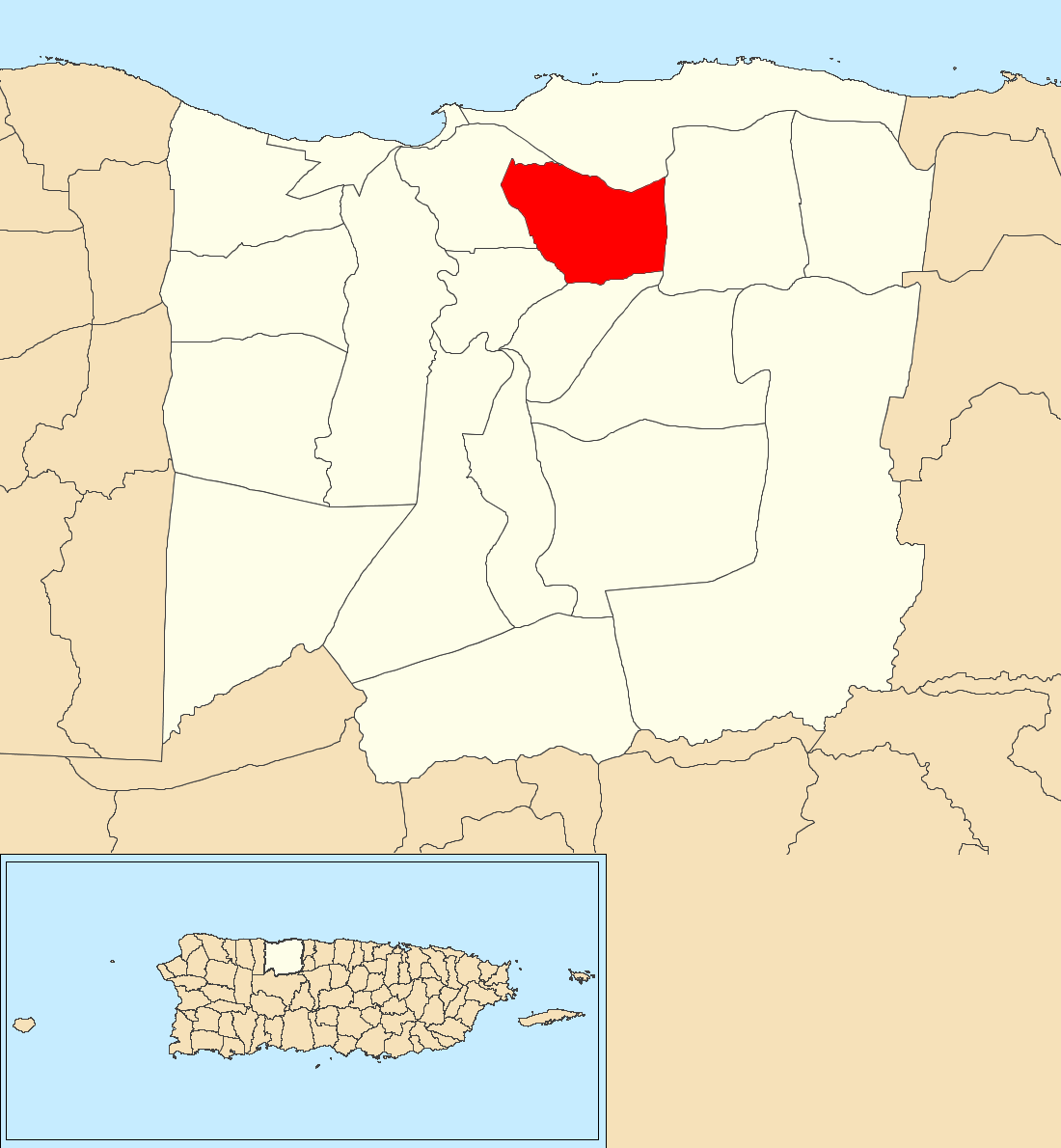
- Location of Santana within the municipality of Arecibo shown in red

- Location of Puerto Rico
- Coordinates: 18°27′08″N 66°40′00″W
- Commonwealth: Puerto Rico
- Municipality: Arecibo

Area
  - Total: 3.87 sq mi (10.0 km^{2})
  - Land: 3.85 sq mi (10.0 km^{2})
  - Water: 0.02 sq mi (0.052 km^{2})
- Elevation: 10 ft (3.0 m)

Population (2010)
  - Total: 5,253
  - Density: 1,364.4/sq mi (526.8/km^{2})
- Source: 2010 Census
- Time zone: UTC−4 (AST)

Santana is a barrio in the municipality of Arecibo, Puerto Rico. Its population in 2010 was 5,253.

== Features ==
Santana is home to a large industrial park. St. Jude Medical, and Eaton Corporation are among the corporations with plants in Santana.

The only drive-in movie theatre in Puerto Rico is located in Santana.

== History ==
Santana was in Spain's gazetteers until Puerto Rico was ceded by Spain in the aftermath of the Spanish–American War under the terms of the Treaty of Paris of 1898 and became an unincorporated territory of the United States. In 1899, the United States Department of War conducted a census of Puerto Rico finding that the population of Santana barrio was 1,555.

Historical population
Census	Pop.	Note	%±
1900	1,555		—
1910	1,655		6.4%
1920	1,748		5.6%
1930	1,810		3.5%
1940	2,259		24.8%
1950	2,660		17.8%
1960	3,150		18.4%
1970	3,380		7.3%
1980	3,573		5.7%
1990	4,200		17.5%
2000	4,857		15.6%
2010	5,253		8.2%
U.S. Decennial Census; 1899 (shown as 1900) 1910-1930; 1930-1950 1980-2000 2010

== Sectors ==
Barrios (which are, in contemporary times, roughly comparable to minor civil divisions) in turn are further subdivided into smaller local populated place areas/units called sectores (sectors in English). The types of sectores may vary, from normally sector to urbanización to reparto to barriada to residencial, among others.

The following sectors are in Santana barrio:

Apartamentos Paseos Reales, Calle Gerónimo, Calle Landrón, Calle Los Rivera, Comunidad Las Pérez, Comunidad Los Llanos, Condominios Arecibo Apartments, Hermandad, Sector Ánimas, Sector Cercadillo, Sector El Palmar, Sector La Represa, Sector Los Gallegos, Sector Puerco Flaco, Urbanización El Capitolio, Urbanización Estancias Balseiro, Urbanización Estancias del Molino, Urbanización Los Pinos, Urbanización Los Pinos 2, Urbanización Paseos Reales, Urbanización Sagrado Corazón, Urbanización Tanamá, and Urbanización Villa Mena.

== Gallery ==
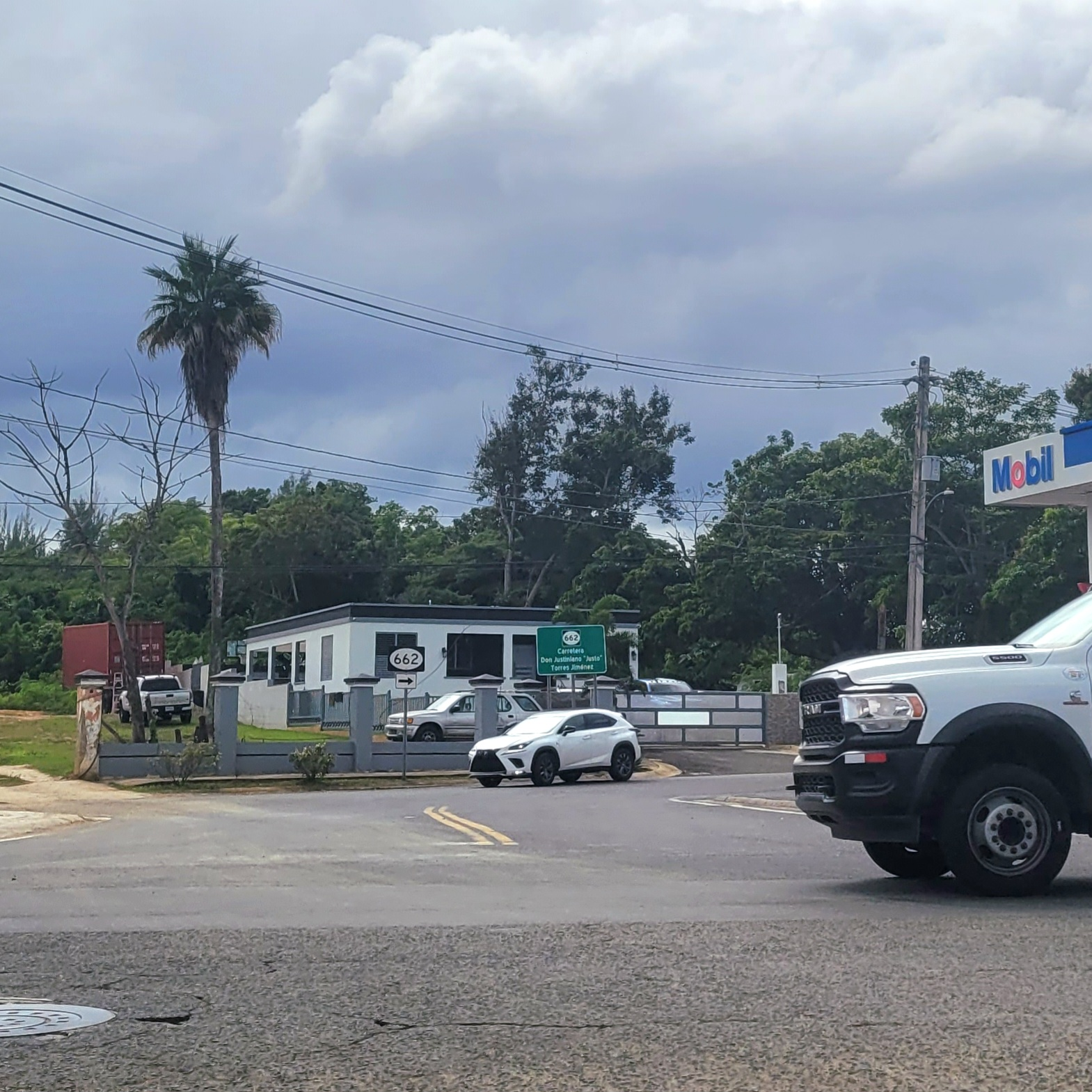
Puerto Rico Highway 662 in Santana

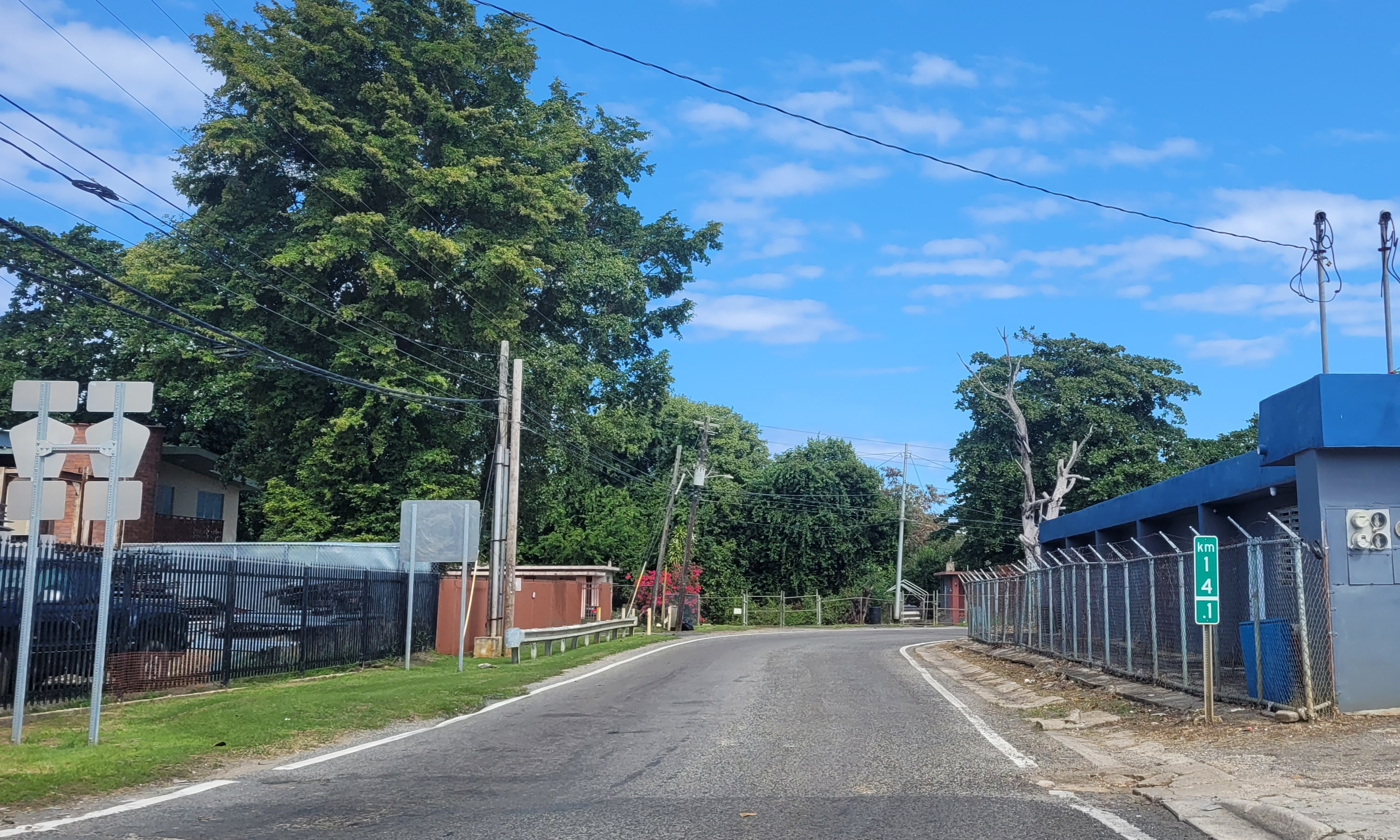
Puerto Rico Highway 682 in Santana

== See also ==
- List of communities in Puerto Rico
- List of barrios and sectors of Arecibo, Puerto Rico
