= Arrozal, Arecibo, Puerto Rico =

Barrio of Puerto Rico

Arrozal
- Barrio
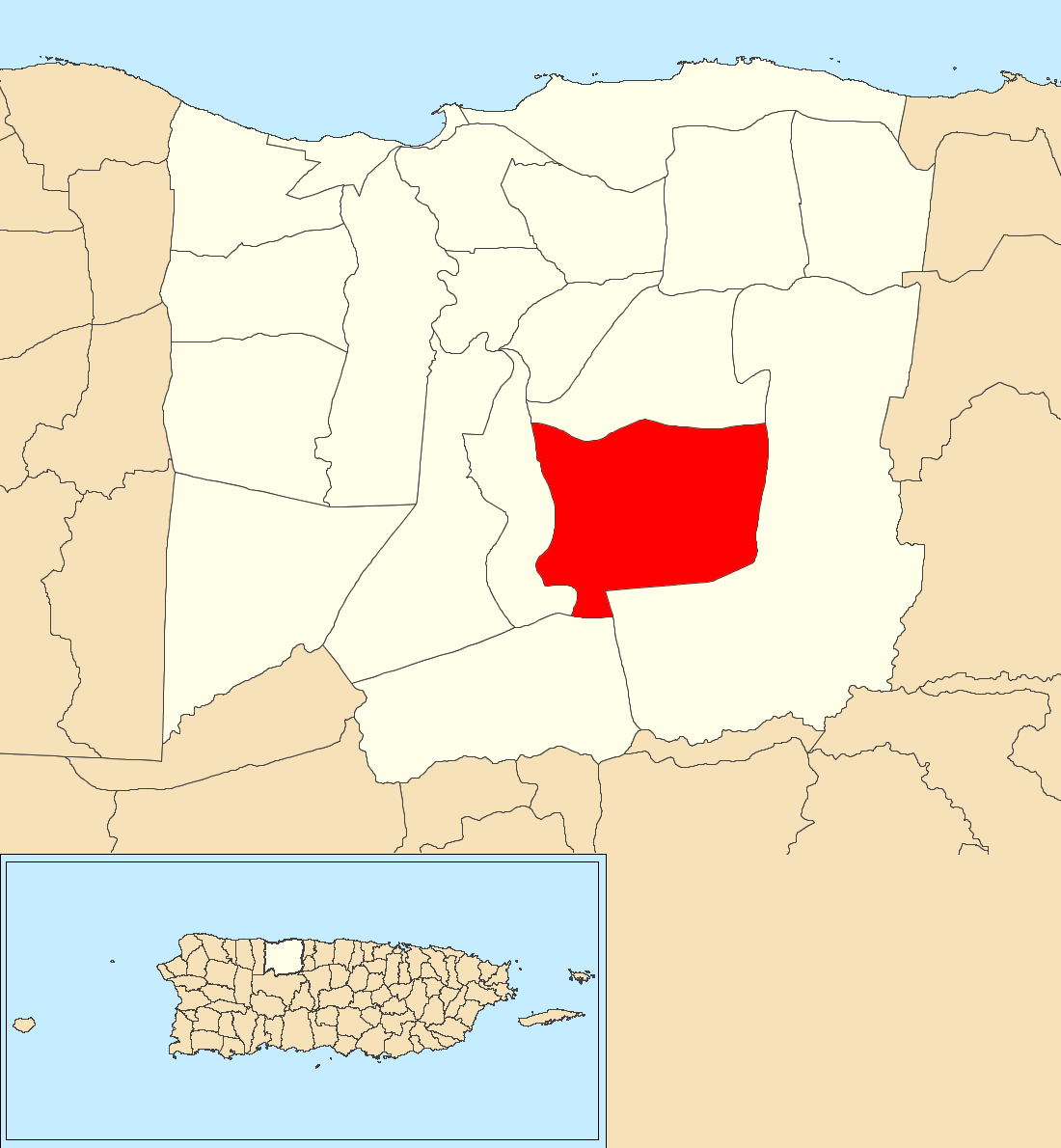
- Location of Arrozal within the municipality of Arecibo shown in red

- Location of Puerto Rico
- Coordinates: 18°22′59″N 66°38′46″W
- Commonwealth: Puerto Rico
- Municipality: Arecibo

Area
  - Total: 9.47 sq mi (24.5 km^{2})
  - Land: 9.46 sq mi (24.5 km^{2})
  - Water: 0.01 sq mi (0.026 km^{2})
- Elevation: 709 ft (216 m)

Population (2010)
  - Total: 1,445
  - Density: 152.7/sq mi (59.0/km^{2})
- Source: 2010 Census
- Time zone: UTC−4 (AST)
- ZIP Code: 00612

Arrozal is a barrio in the municipality of Arecibo, Puerto Rico. Its population in 2010 was 1,445.

== History ==
Arrozal was in Spain's gazetteers until Puerto Rico was ceded by Spain in the aftermath of the Spanish–American War under the terms of the Treaty of Paris of 1898 and became an unincorporated territory of the United States. In 1899, the United States Department of War conducted a census of Puerto Rico finding that the population of Arrozal barrio was 1,662.

Historical population
Census	Pop.	Note	%±
1900	1,662		—
1910	1,488		−10.5%
1920	1,872		25.8%
1930	1,721		−8.1%
1940	2,074		20.5%
1950	1,472		−29.0%
1960	1,547		5.1%
1970	1,159		−25.1%
1980	787		−32.1%
1990	554		−29.6%
2000	1,218		119.9%
2010	1,445		18.6%
U.S. Decennial Census; 1899 (shown as 1900) 1910-1930; 1930-1950 1980-2000 2010

== Sectors ==
Barrios (which are, in contemporary times, roughly comparable to minor civil divisions) in turn are further subdivided into smaller local populated place areas/units called sectores (sectors in English). The types of sectores may vary, from normally sector to urbanización to reparto to barriada to residencial, among others.

The following sectors are in Arrozal barrio:

Sector Las Cántaras, Sector Los Muertos, Sector Los Puertos, Sector Quebrada del Palo, Sector Varela, and Sector Zenón Rivera.

== See also ==
- List of communities in Puerto Rico
- List of barrios and sectors of Arecibo, Puerto Rico
