= Ruben Natal-San Miguel =

Puerto Rican-born New York-based photographer (born 1963)

- Born: 1963 (age 62–63); Arecibo, Puerto Rico

Ruben Natal-San Miguel (born 1963) is a Puerto Rican-born photographer recognized for his work capturing individuals and urban life. Natal-San Miguel lives in Harlem, New York City.

== Work ==
Natal-San Miguel's photography focuses on environmental portraiture. In 2020, he released his 'Women R Beautiful' series. In 2025, Natal-San Miguel exhibited a photo series focused on Puerto Rico, titled Huracán Architectures at The Hemispheric Institute of NYU.
