= Edificio Oliver =

- U.S. National Register of Historic Places
- Puerto Rico Historic Sites and Zones
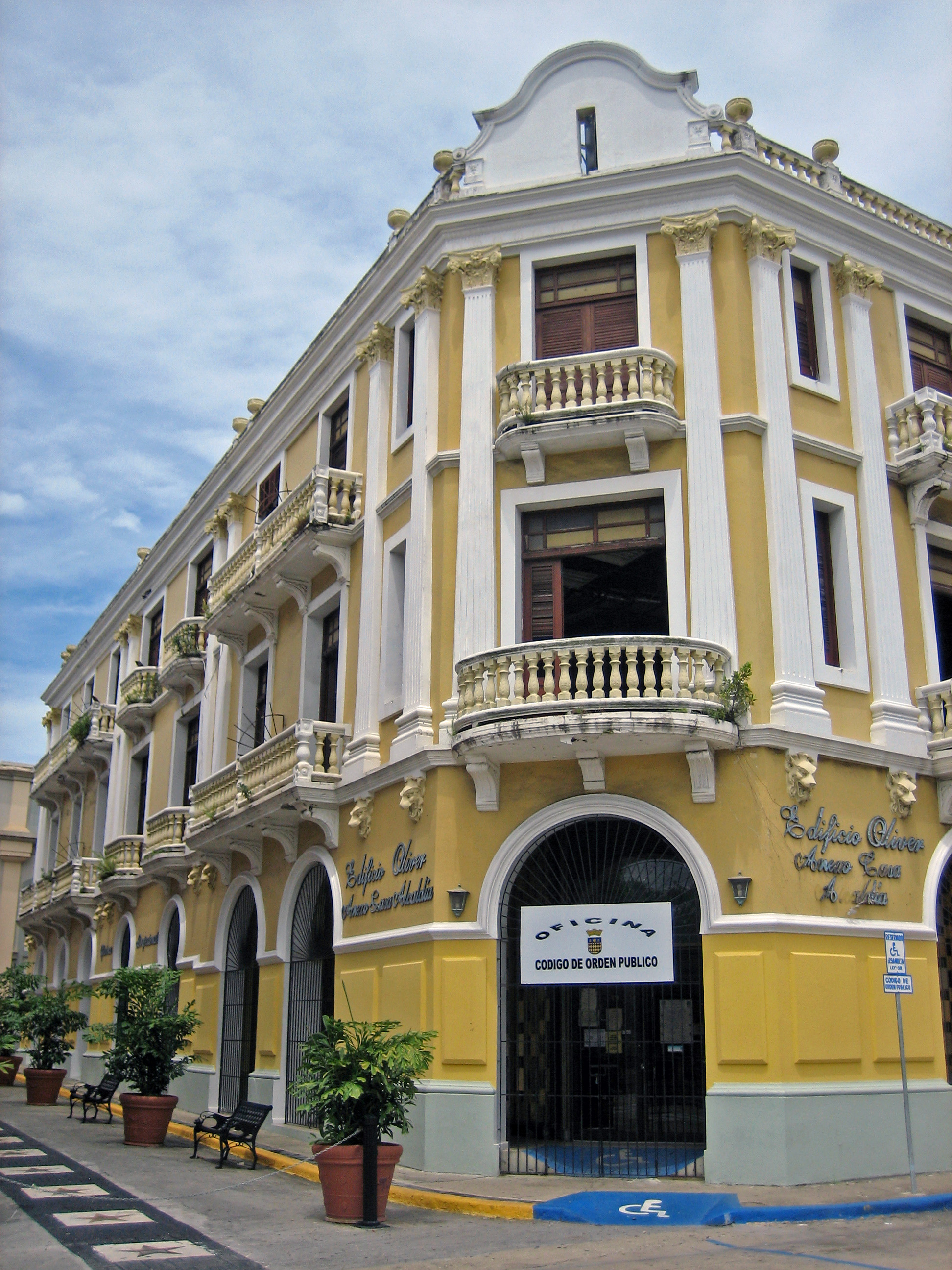
- Edificio Oliver in 2009

- Location within Puerto Rico
- Location: 64 Calle José de Diego; Arecibo, Puerto Rico
- Coordinates: 18°28′21″N 66°42′55″W
- Built: 1914
- Architectural style: Beaux Arts
- NRHP reference No.: 86002764
- RNSZH No.: 2000-(RN)-20-JP-SH

Significant dates
- Added to NRHP: October 1, 1986
- Designated RNSZH: December 21, 2000

Edificio Oliver in Arecibo, Puerto Rico was built in 1914. The building houses government offices for the municipality of Arecibo.

A Beaux Arts-style building, it was the first building made of reinforced concrete in the Arecibo area.

It is located in the town center on the location of the former "King's House", the military garrison building built by the Spanish government in 1765. After 1868 that building became a courthouse, a police headquarters, and a public school then was demolished in 1913. The Edificio Oliver was built soon after in the corner location and was used both as a residence and for commercial purposes. It served also served as a foreign consulate.

Edificio Oliver was listed on the National Register of Historic Places in 1986, and on the Puerto Rico Register of Historic Sites and Zones in 2000.
