= Arecibo Light =

Lighthouse in Arecibo, Puerto Rico

Arecibo Lighthouse
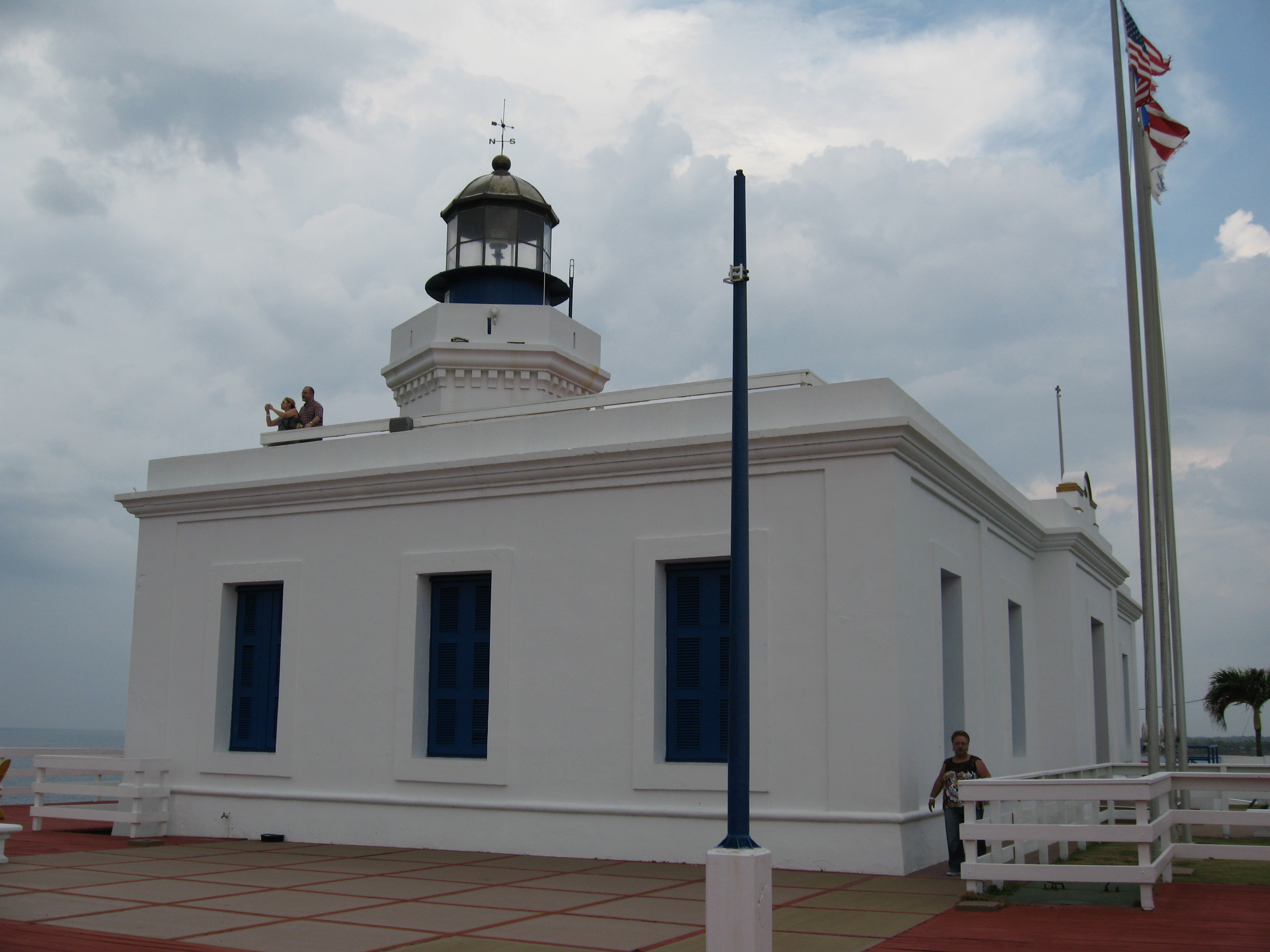
- A closeup view of Arecibo Lighthouse
- Location: Arecibo; Puerto Rico
- Coordinates: 18°28′55.076″N 66°41′55.335″W

Tower
- Constructed: 1898
- Foundation: Stone base
- Construction: Stone and Brick Tower
- Automated: 1964
- Height: 46 feet (14 m)
- Shape: Hexagonal tower with balcony and lantern attached to the primary building.
- Markings: white tower, black lantern
- Heritage: National Register of Historic Places listed place

Light
- First lit: 1898
- Focal height: 120 feet (37 m)
- Lens: Third order Fresnel lens (1898)
- Range: 14 nautical miles (26 km; 16 mi)
- Characteristic: Fl W 5s.
- Faro de Arecibo
- U.S. National Register of Historic Places
- Puerto Rico Historic Sites and Zones
- Architectural style: Neoclassic
- MPS: Lighthouse System of Puerto Rico TR
- NRHP reference No.: 77001546

The Arecibo Lighthouse & Historical Park (Spanish: Faro de Arecibo) is located in the city of Arecibo, Puerto Rico. Also known as Los Morrillos Lighthouse, it stands as a monument to Puerto Rico's complex history under Spanish colonial rule. Completed in 1898 atop the Punta Morillos headland, this lighthouse represents one of Spain's final maritime investments on the island, built just months before the Spanish-American War transferred sovereignty to the United States. Despite this geopolitical shift, the lighthouse has endured as a functioning navigational aid and cultural landmark.

== History ==
The lighthouse was designed to exemplify neoclassical architectural style, featuring a stately rectangular building with an attached hexagonal tower. The rectangular keeper's house measures 40 feet 4 inches (12.29 m) wide by 84 feet 2 inches (25.65 m) long. The hexagonal tower is topped by a bronze dome that encloses the working lantern room.

The original lighting apparatus was a Fresnel lens of the third order, able to project a beam of light with a radius of 18 miles to warn approaching ships. In 1931, the lighthouse was modernized and converted to electric power. Today, the lantern houses a 190mm lens that emits a bright white flash repeating every five seconds.

After the light was automated in 1964, the unmanned structure fell victim to decay and vandalism without resident keepers. The original Fresnel lens was damaged in 1975 and completely destroyed in 1977.

After years of neglect, the Arecibo Lighthouse underwent a restoration in 2001 by a private company. It is now operated as the Arecibo Lighthouse and Historical Park, featuring interactive exhibits. Visitors can explore a replica Taíno Indian village, models of Columbus' legendary ships, slavery quarters, a pirate ship replica and cave, mini zoo, saltwater aquariums, playground, and water park. The lighthouse itself houses a museum with maritime artifacts, exhibits on the lighthouse's engineering and history, and the Spanish-American War.

== Gallery ==
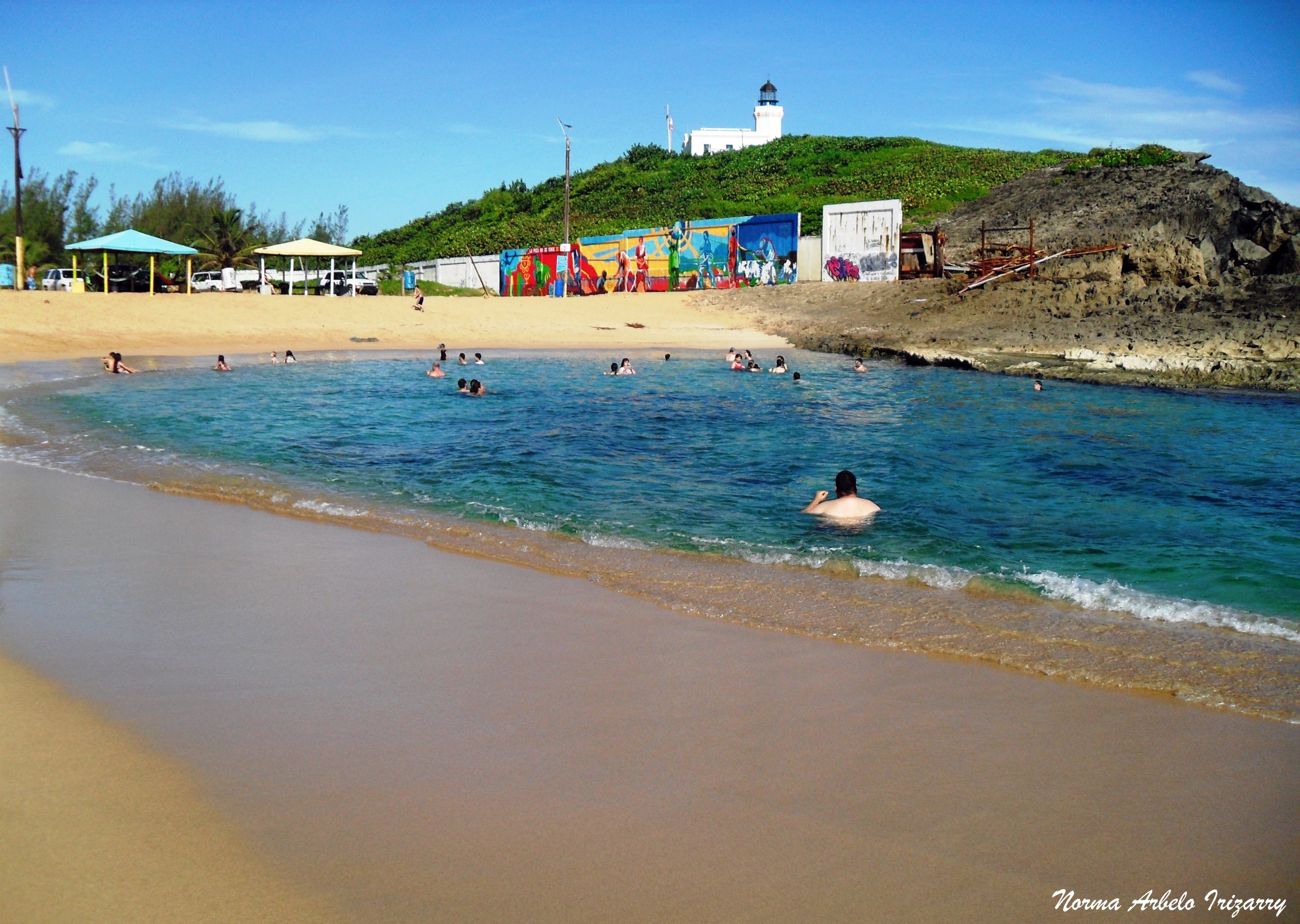
View of Arecibo Light from Playa La Poza del Obispo

== See also ==
- List of lighthouses in Puerto Rico
