= Arecibo, Puerto Rico =

City and municipality in Puerto Rico

Arecibo Municipio Autónomo de Arecibo
- Municipality
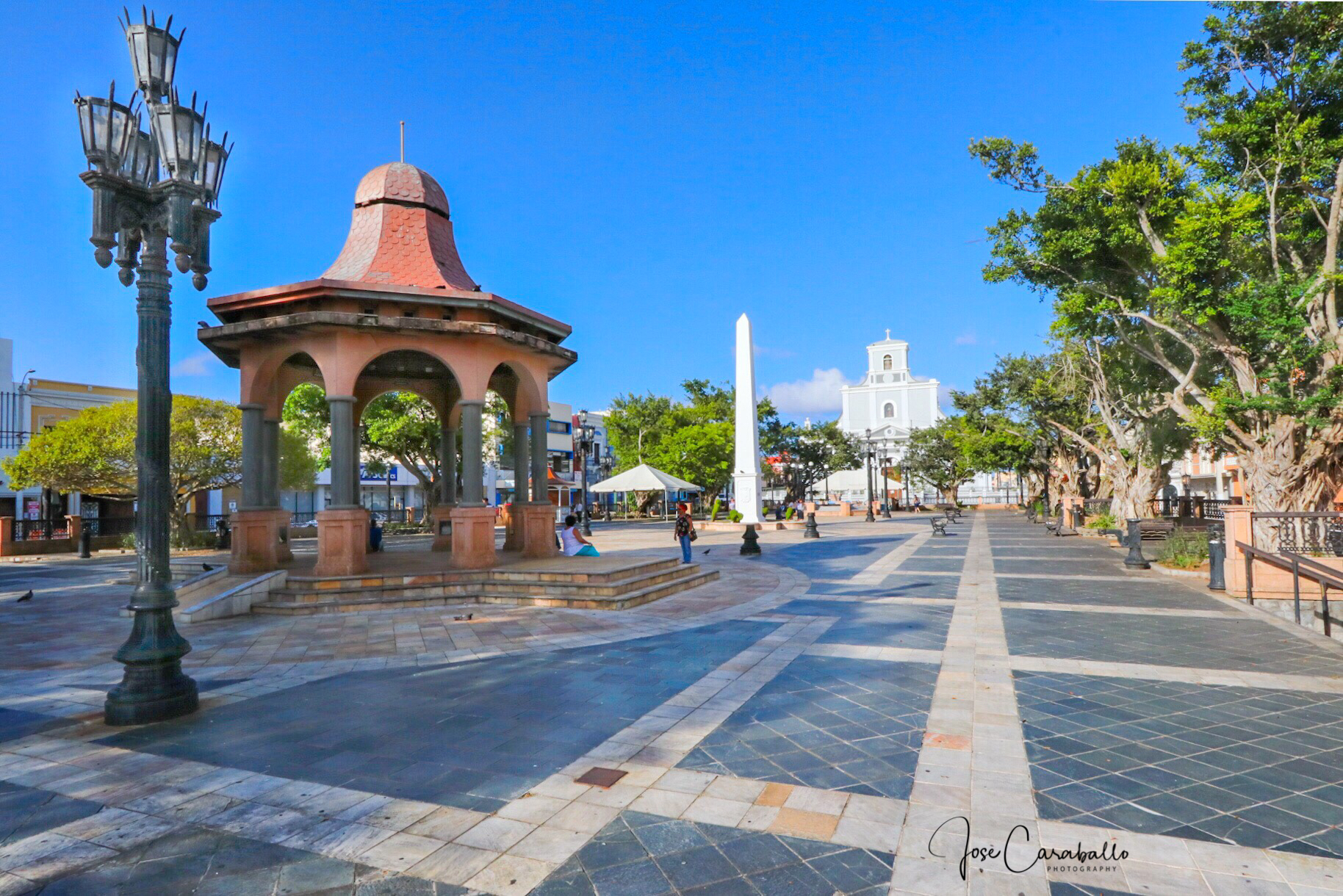
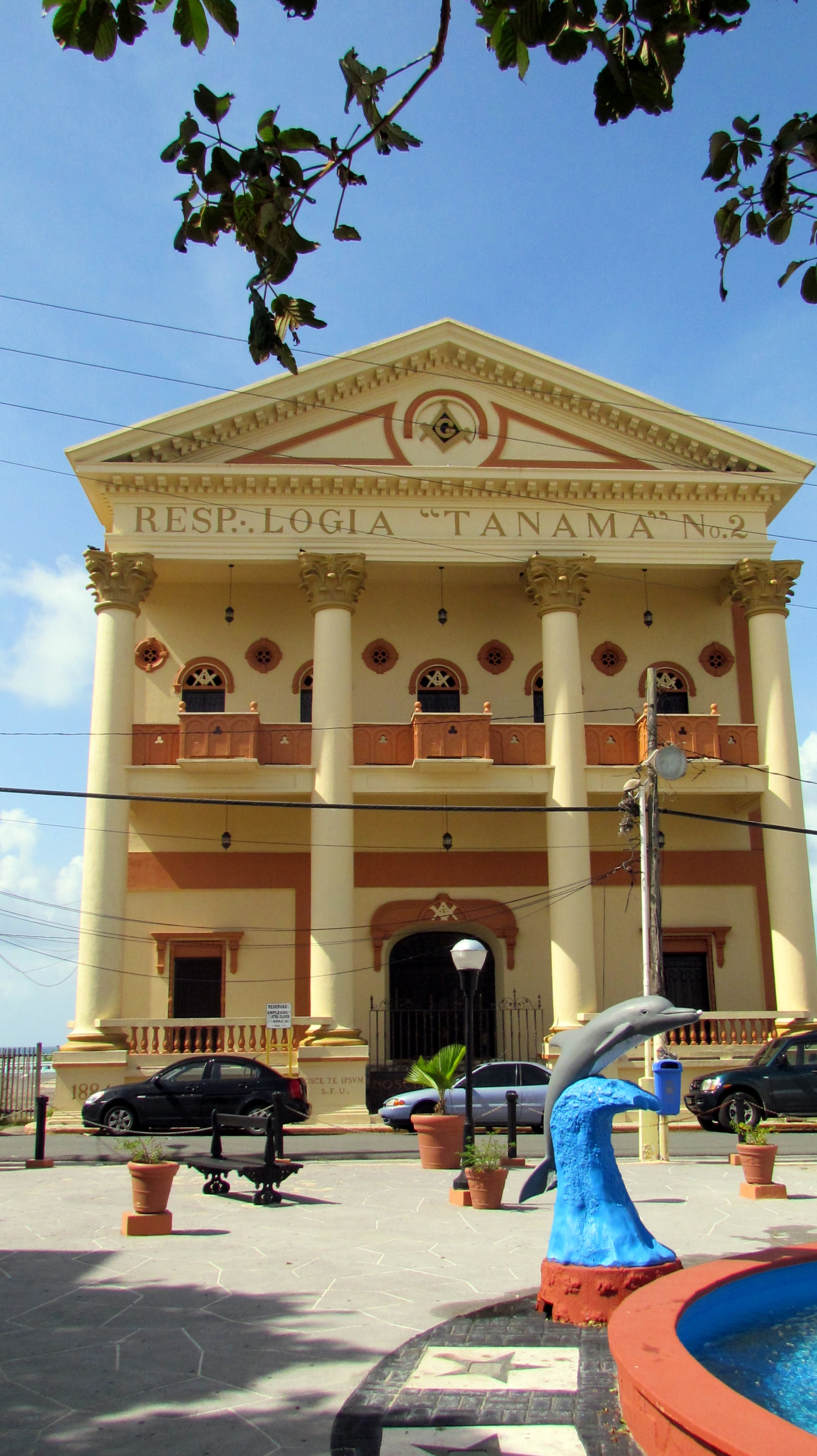
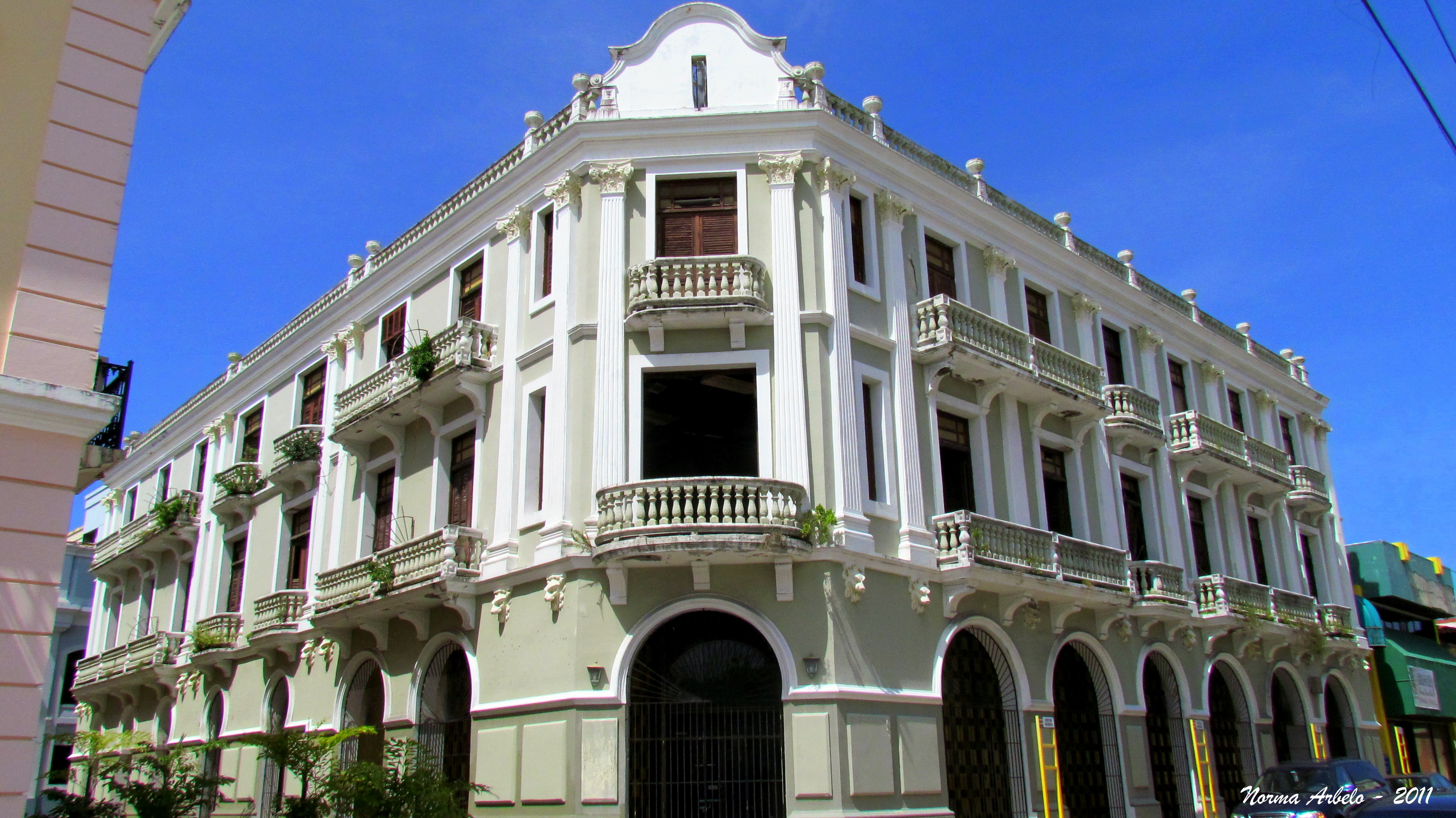
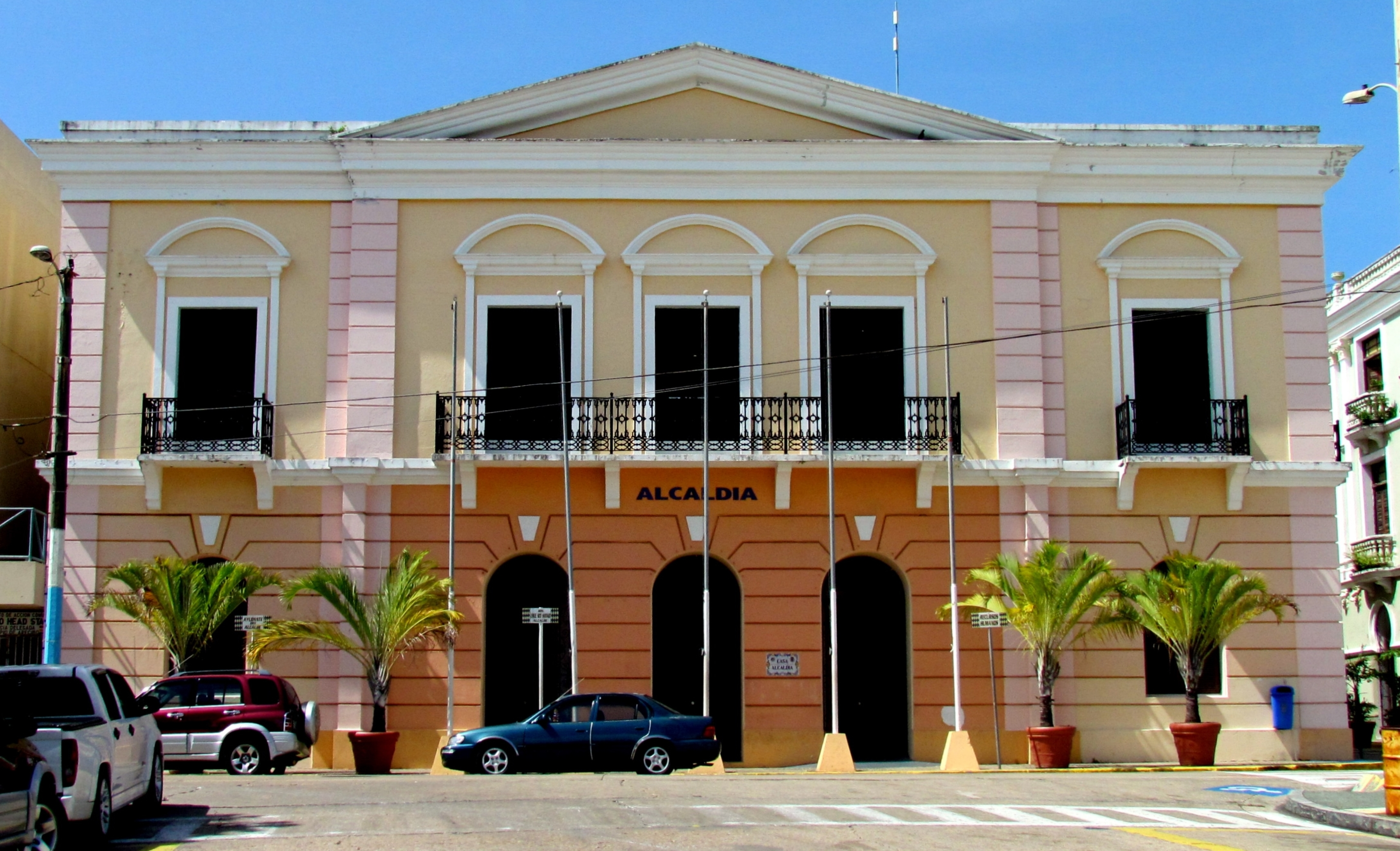
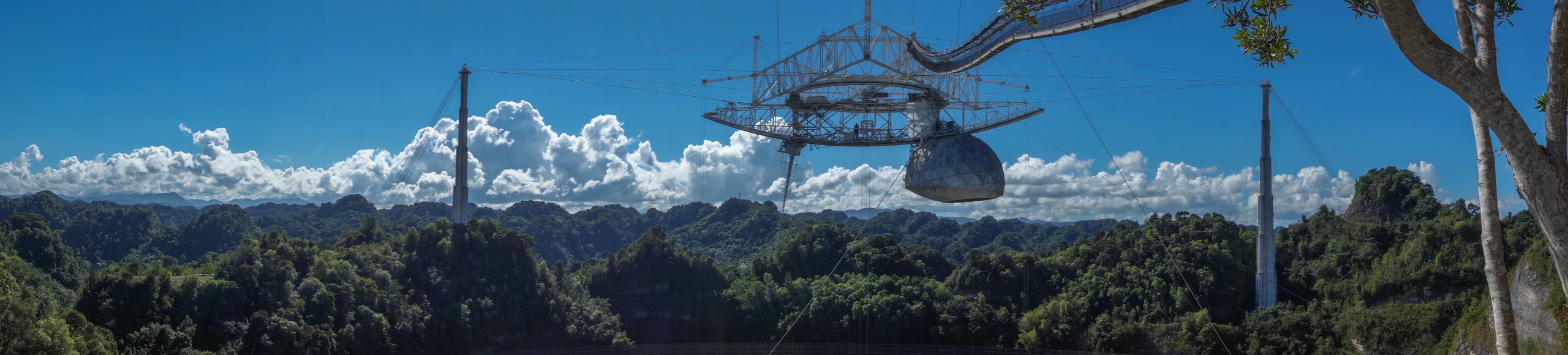
- From top, left to right: Town square and cathedral, Old Tanamá Masonic Lodge, Oliver Building, and city hall in Arecibo Pueblo; Arecibo Observatory

- Flag Coat of arms
- Nicknames: "La Villa del Capitán Correa", "Muy Leal", "Ciudad del Cetí", "Diamante del Norte" (Diamond of the North)
- Anthem: "Arecibo"
- Map of Puerto Rico highlighting Arecibo Municipality
- Coordinates: 18°22′30″N 66°37′30″W
- Sovereign state: United States
- Commonwealth: Puerto Rico
- First settled: 1556
- Founded: May 1, 1616
- Named for: Arasibo
- Barrios: 19 barrios: Arecibo barrio-pueblo; Arenalejos; Arrozal; Cambalache; Carreras; Domingo Ruíz; Dominguito; Esperanza; Factor; Garrochales; Hato Abajo; Hato Arriba; Hato Viejo; Islote; Miraflores; Río Arriba; Sabana Hoyos; Santana; Tanamá

Government
  - Mayor: Carlos (Tito) Ramírez Irizarry (PPD)
  - Senatorial dist.: 3 – Arecibo
  - Representative dist.: 13, 14

Area
  - Municipality: 171.22 sq mi (443.5 km^{2})
  - Land: 125.99 sq mi (326.3 km^{2})
  - Water: 45.23 sq mi (117.1 km^{2})
- Elevation: 23 ft (7 m)

Population (2020)
  - Municipality: 87,754
  - Estimate (2025): 85,539 ▼
  - Rank: 7th in Puerto Rico
  - Density: 696.52/sq mi (268.93/km^{2})
  - Metro: 182,705 (MSA)
  - Racial groups (2010 Census): %26.67% White 23.51% other race White; 5.1% Black; 0.5% American Indian; 1.18% Asian; 46.66% mixed or other
- Demonym: Arecibeños
- Time zone: UTC−4 (AST)
- ZIP Codes: 00612, 00613, 00614, 00616, 00652, 00688
- Area code: 787/939

Arecibo (/ˌærəˈsiːboʊ/; Spanish pronunciation: [aɾeˈsiβo]) is a city and municipality on the northern coast of Puerto Rico, on the shores of the Atlantic Ocean, located north of Utuado and Ciales; east of Hatillo; and west of Barceloneta and Florida. It is about 50 miles (80 km) west of San Juan, the capital city. Arecibo is the largest municipality in Puerto Rico by area, and it is the core city of the Arecibo Metropolitan Statistical Area and part of the greater San Juan–Bayamón, PR Combined Statistical Area. It is spread over 18 barrios and Arecibo Pueblo (the downtown area and the administrative center of the city). Its population in 2020 was 87,754.

The Arecibo Observatory, which housed the Arecibo Telescope, the world's largest radio telescope until July 2016, is located in the municipality. The Arecibo telescope collapsed on December 1, 2020. Arecibo is the seat of the Roman Catholic Diocese of Arecibo.

== Etymology and nicknames ==
The name Arecibo comes from Arasibo, the Taíno cacique of the yucayeque "settlement" of Abacoa, where the Spanish town of Arecibo was established in 1556. The word Arasibo itself most likely comes from the Taíno words ara, possibly meaning or related to "people", and siba, most likely meaning "rock" or "stone". This name also lends itself to the river which flows through the municipality into the Atlantic Ocean.

Some of the city's nicknames are Villa del Capitán Correa ("Villa of Captain Correa"), after Antonio de los Reyes Correa, a Spanish soldier who famously and successfully defended the city from a British invasion; La Muy Leal ("the very loyal"), after a title often granted to Spanish colonial cities; and Diamante del Norte ("Diamond of the North"), due to the city's location on the northern coast of the island.

== History ==
When the Spanish arrived, they found the area occupied by the indigenous Taíno, led by Xamaica Arasibo, Cacique (chief) of the yucayeque (town) then named Abacoa. Spanish colonists settled Arecibo in 1556, which they named for the cacique. It was their fourth settlement on the island, after Caparra (which later became San Juan), San German, and Coamo. Arecibo was officially founded as a town by the Spanish crown on May 1, 1616, under the governorship of Captain Felipe de Beaumont y Navarra, when the King of Spain granted the land (and the Taino living there) to Lope Conchillos.

For some time the island was competed for by other European powers. On August 5, 1702, Captain Antonio de los Reyes Correa, commanding 30 militiamen, successfully defended Arecibo from an attack by two Royal Navy warships under William Whetstone. Whetstone's ships landed 40 marines and sailors on two rowboats, but Correa's troops ambushed the invaders, killing 22 and forcing the remainder to retreat. Spanish cannon fire also killed 8 men onboard Whetstone's ships. The Spanish defenders suffered one killed and three wounded, including Correa. This gave the city its nickname "The Village of Captain Correa".

In 1778, Arecibo, by royal decree, was awarded the "Villa" status, though it was not integrated as such until 1802. In 1850 it was awarded the "Muy Leal" (very loyal) title. Over time, large part of its territory became separate municipalities. These include Manati, Barceloneta, Florida, Utuado, Jayuya, Hatillo, Camuy, Quebradillas and Isabela. In 1982, it was promoted to city status, though it continued to be known by its previous nickname.

Hurricane Maria on September 20, 2017, triggered extensive flooding, and damage to infrastructure with over 3,000 people losing their homes. Two hospitals were damaged and the hurricane caused deaths as well.

== Geography ==
Arecibo is located in the Northern Coastal Plain region of Puerto Rico, extending inland into the Northern Karst Belt. It lies on the Atlantic Ocean north of Utuado, east of Hatillo, and west of Barceloneta and Florida. The city occupies an area of 127 square miles (330 km^{2}), of which, 45.23 sq mi (117.1 km^{2}), is water.

The Río Grande de Arecibo is the main river in the municipality, running through the middle of it. South of the municipality, in the karst region, it forms the Dos Bocas Lake, a primary source of water for northern Puerto Rico. Several rivers feed the Río Grande, including the Tanamá River. Caño Santiago is an artificial canal created in the 19th century by partially diverting the Tanama River's waters tobarrios a small temporary stream, to supply water to poor neighborhoods in Arecibo, discharging into the Arecibo River near its mouth. In the 1950s it was modified to pass slightly more south of the city center. Poor maintenance, sediment and pollution has again turned the canal into a temporary stream. East of the river lies Caño Tiburones, a vital marshland area providing habitat for many birds and wildlife.

Arecibo has two forest reserves. Cambalache Forest Reserve is located along Barceloneta's municipal limits while Río Abajo State Forest is located between Arecibo and Utuado. Caves include Cueva Ventana, which overlooks the valley formed by the Rio Grande de Arecibo, and Cueva del Indio (Cave of the Indian), where paintings made by prehistoric indigenous peoples have been seen.

Environmental impact studies have been done to consider remedies for flooding that often occurs in Arecibo.

=== Barrios ===
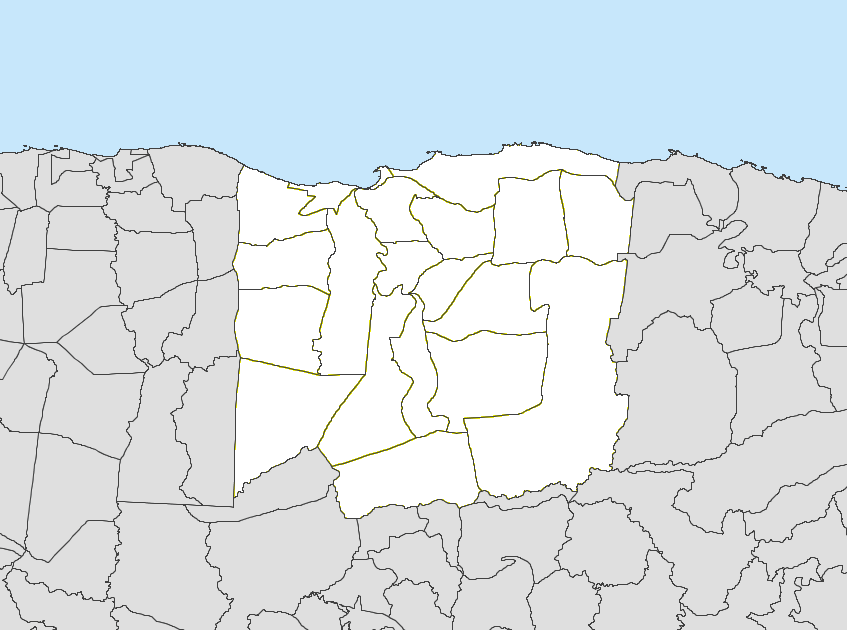
Subdivisions of Arecibo

Like all municipalities of Puerto Rico, Arecibo is subdivided into barrios. The municipal buildings, central square and large Catholic church are located in a small barrio referred to as "el pueblo", near the center of the municipality.

1. Arecibo barrio-pueblo including Jareales subbarrio
2. Arenalejos
3. Arrozal
4. Cambalache
5. Carreras
6. Domingo Ruíz
7. Dominguito
8. Esperanza
9. Factor
10. Garrochales
11. Hato Abajo
12. Hato Arriba
13. Hato Viejo
14. Islote
15. Miraflores
16. Río Arriba
17. Sabana Hoyos
18. Santana
19. Tanamá

=== Sectors ===
Barrios (which for US census purposes, are like minor civil divisions) in turn are further subdivided into smaller local populated place areas/units called sectores (sectors in English). The types of sectores may vary, from normally sector to urbanización to reparto to barriada to residencial, among others.

=== Special Communities ===
Comunidades Especiales de Puerto Rico (Special Communities of Puerto Rico) are marginalized communities whose citizens are experiencing a certain amount of social exclusion. A map shows these communities occur in nearly every municipality of the commonwealth. Of the 742 places that were on the list in 2014, the following barrios, communities, sectors, or neighborhoods were in Arecibo: Animas – Factor 1, Sector Los Muertos in Arrozal, Sector El Jobo in Rio Arriba, Sector El Valle in Rio Arriba, Buenos Aires (Magallanes), Calichoza, Canta Gallo, Carreras, Cruz Roja, El Cerro – Factor 1, Abra San Francisco, El Vigía, Esperanza (Cienagueta), La Planta, Palo Blanco, and Sector Carolina in Sabana Hoyos.

=== Climate ===
Tropical monsoon climate, occasionally also known as a tropical wet climate or tropical monsoon and trade-wind littoral climate in climate classification, is a relatively rare type of climate. The Köppen Climate Classification subtype for this climate is "Am". (Tropical Monsoon Climate).

Climate data for Arecibo Observatory (elevation: 1,060 feet (320 m)) (1991–2020 normals, extremes 1980–present)
Month	Jan	Feb	Mar	Apr	May	Jun	Jul	Aug	Sep	Oct	Nov	Dec	Year
Record high °F (°C)	93 (34)	94 (34)	94 (34)	93 (34)	94 (34)	97 (36)	97 (36)	95 (35)	95 (35)	96 (36)	93 (34)	92 (33)	97 (36)
Mean maximum °F (°C)	86.3 (30.2)	87.1 (30.6)	88.5 (31.4)	89.7 (32.1)	90.7 (32.6)	91.6 (33.1)	91.7 (33.2)	91.5 (33.1)	91.8 (33.2)	90.7 (32.6)	88.4 (31.3)	86.3 (30.2)	93.7 (34.3)
Mean daily maximum °F (°C)	79.9 (26.6)	80.7 (27.1)	81.9 (27.7)	83.2 (28.4)	84.7 (29.3)	86.7 (30.4)	86.6 (30.3)	86.4 (30.2)	86.3 (30.2)	85.5 (29.7)	82.4 (28.0)	80.7 (27.1)	83.8 (28.8)
Daily mean °F (°C)	70.4 (21.3)	70.6 (21.4)	71.3 (21.8)	72.8 (22.7)	74.6 (23.7)	76.3 (24.6)	76.4 (24.7)	76.7 (24.8)	76.5 (24.7)	75.8 (24.3)	73.6 (23.1)	71.6 (22.0)	73.9 (23.3)
Mean daily minimum °F (°C)	61.0 (16.1)	60.6 (15.9)	60.6 (15.9)	62.4 (16.9)	64.5 (18.1)	65.9 (18.8)	66.3 (19.1)	66.9 (19.4)	66.7 (19.3)	66.1 (18.9)	64.7 (18.2)	62.6 (17.0)	64.0 (17.8)
Mean minimum °F (°C)	55.8 (13.2)	57.1 (13.9)	57.1 (13.9)	58.7 (14.8)	61.4 (16.3)	63.6 (17.6)	63.6 (17.6)	63.2 (17.3)	64.1 (17.8)	63.5 (17.5)	60.9 (16.1)	58.1 (14.5)	53.2 (11.8)
Record low °F (°C)	45 (7)	48 (9)	47 (8)	47 (8)	51 (11)	54 (12)	52 (11)	50 (10)	53 (12)	50 (10)	54 (12)	47 (8)	45 (7)
Average precipitation inches (mm)	4.33 (110)	3.45 (88)	5.28 (134)	7.43 (189)	10.40 (264)	6.71 (170)	6.87 (174)	9.53 (242)	9.91 (252)	8.29 (211)	7.55 (192)	4.83 (123)	84.58 (2,148)
Average precipitation days (≥ 0.01 in)	12.3	10.2	11.7	13.5	16.1	12.7	15.0	15.7	16.7	17.0	16.3	13.6	170.8
Source: NOAA

Climate data for Dos Bocas, Puerto Rico (200 feet (61 m)) (1991–2020 normals, extremes 1937–present)
Month	Jan	Feb	Mar	Apr	May	Jun	Jul	Aug	Sep	Oct	Nov	Dec	Year
Record high °F (°C)	96 (36)	94 (34)	96 (36)	98 (37)	98 (37)	99 (37)	98 (37)	100 (38)	100 (38)	98 (37)	97 (36)	96 (36)	100 (38)
Mean maximum °F (°C)	88.0 (31.1)	89.0 (31.7)	90.4 (32.4)	91.6 (33.1)	93.2 (34.0)	94.7 (34.8)	94.2 (34.6)	94.5 (34.7)	93.9 (34.4)	92.9 (33.8)	90.1 (32.3)	88.6 (31.4)	95.7 (35.4)
Mean daily maximum °F (°C)	84.9 (29.4)	85.6 (29.8)	86.3 (30.2)	87.5 (30.8)	88.6 (31.4)	90.8 (32.7)	90.9 (32.7)	90.7 (32.6)	90.6 (32.6)	89.9 (32.2)	87.3 (30.7)	85.5 (29.7)	88.2 (31.2)
Daily mean °F (°C)	74.7 (23.7)	74.7 (23.7)	75.3 (24.1)	77.0 (25.0)	78.7 (25.9)	80.4 (26.9)	80.8 (27.1)	81.0 (27.2)	80.5 (26.9)	79.9 (26.6)	78.0 (25.6)	75.9 (24.4)	78.1 (25.6)
Mean daily minimum °F (°C)	64.5 (18.1)	63.8 (17.7)	64.2 (17.9)	66.5 (19.2)	68.7 (20.4)	70.0 (21.1)	70.8 (21.6)	71.2 (21.8)	70.4 (21.3)	69.8 (21.0)	68.6 (20.3)	66.2 (19.0)	67.9 (19.9)
Mean minimum °F (°C)	60.3 (15.7)	60.0 (15.6)	60.4 (15.8)	62.5 (16.9)	64.6 (18.1)	67.1 (19.5)	67.8 (19.9)	68.4 (20.2)	67.7 (19.8)	67.0 (19.4)	65.0 (18.3)	62.1 (16.7)	58.1 (14.5)
Record low °F (°C)	50 (10)	51 (11)	51 (11)	52 (11)	52 (11)	59 (15)	58 (14)	60 (16)	59 (15)	58 (14)	58 (14)	50 (10)	50 (10)
Average precipitation inches (mm)	3.61 (92)	3.46 (88)	4.82 (122)	6.82 (173)	10.23 (260)	5.81 (148)	5.36 (136)	8.12 (206)	9.69 (246)	8.45 (215)	7.34 (186)	4.54 (115)	78.25 (1,988)
Average precipitation days (≥ 0.01 in)	14.1	11.6	12.8	14.2	17.4	13.1	15.3	17.3	17.7	16.9	17.0	14.5	181.9
Source: NOAA

== Tourism ==
=== Landmarks and places of interest ===
The Arecibo Harbor is managed by the Puerto Rico Ports Authority.

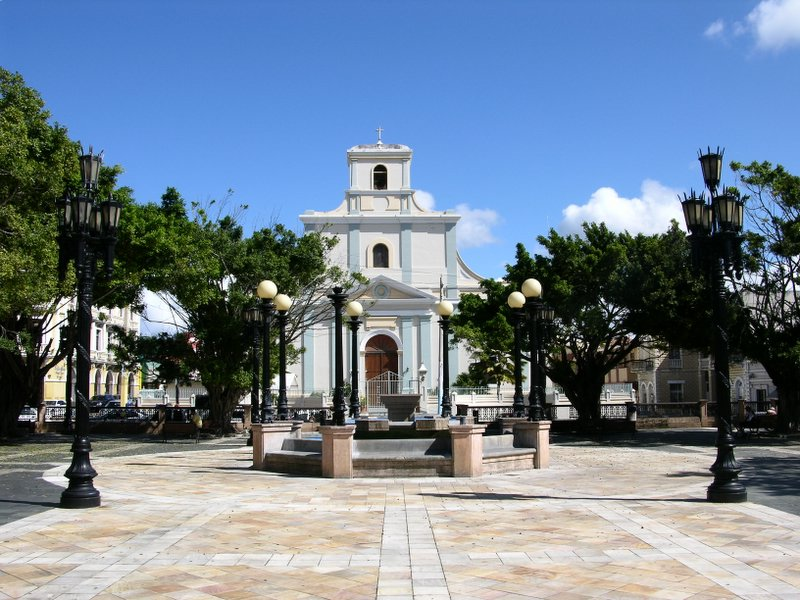
Cathedral of Saint Phillip Apostle in Arecibo barrio-pueblo

Arecibo is one of the oldest colonial towns in Puerto Rico (1616). Among its historic buildings is the Cathedral of Saint Philip the Apostle, built beginning in the late 18th century. The first church, built in the middle of the 17th century, was destroyed by an earthquake in 1787. Construction of its replacement began soon after, although it was not completed until 1846. Four days after its dedication, another earthquake seriously damaged it. Repairs were not completed until 1882. The 1918 earthquake damaged the vault so badly that it was replaced by a flat concrete roof; a vaulted ceiling of composition board was placed inside.

The cathedral of Arecibo is Puerto Rico's second-largest church after the Cathedral of San Juan. The plan is rectangular with three naves; the side naves are cut short to allow large flanking chapels, which occupy almost half the length of the church. The apse is semicircular, and has an unusual half-dome covering it. The facade is a triangular composition of three stages. The top stage, a short central tower, is a later addition, according to local architects and historians. Neoclassic ornamentation is used in an academic fashion on the lowest stage, but the other two show a less traditional use of bands and pilasters. The Renaissance-style windows are uncommon in Puerto Rican churches, but the central tower over the entrance is a common motif used throughout the island.

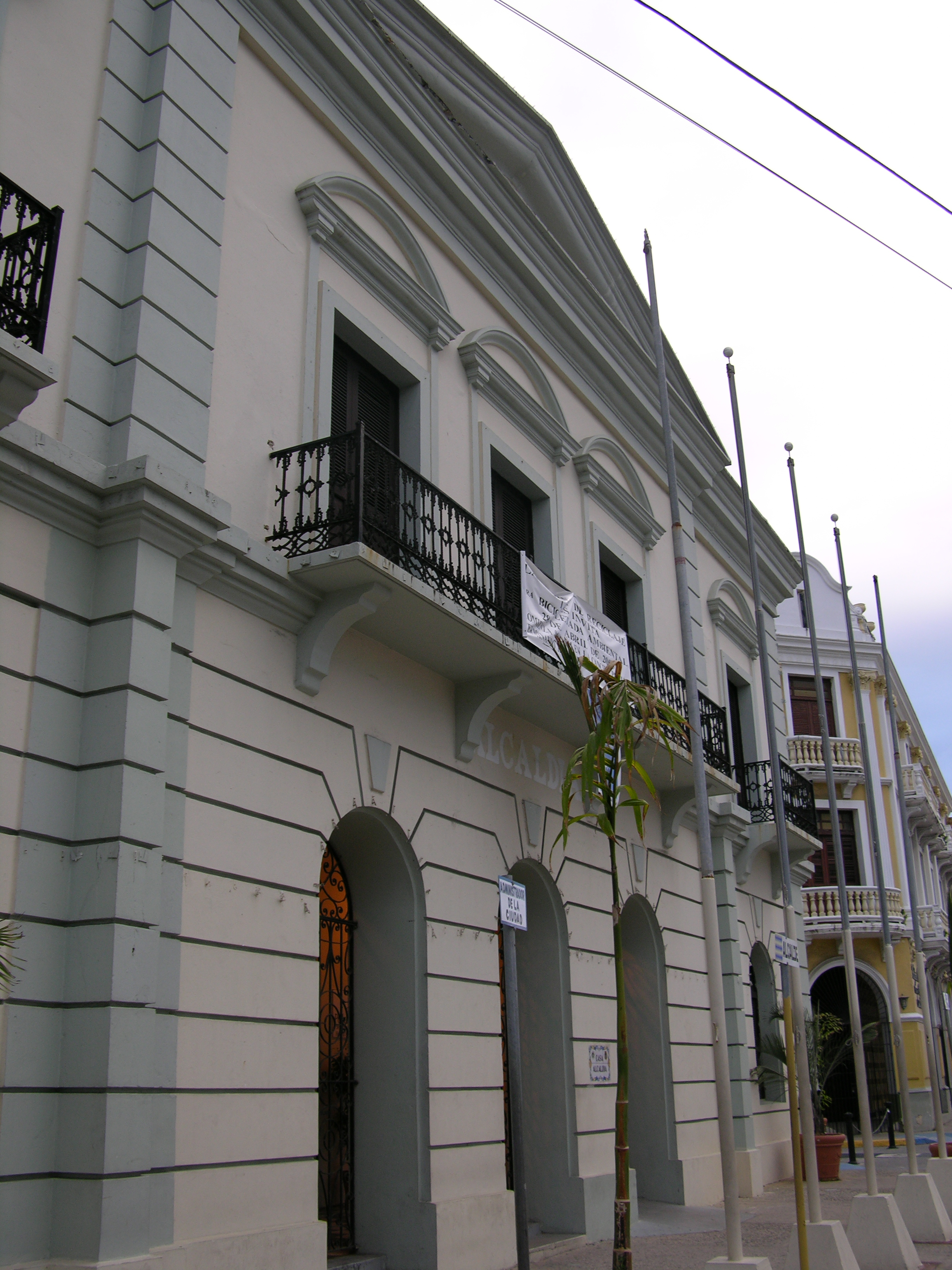
Arecibo City Hall

The City Hall, built in 1866, served as jail to revolutionaries of El Grito de Lares in 1868. In the 1918 earthquake, the frontal section of the building was destroyed. When repairs were made, a tower and clock were added to the building. In 1978, the building was restored to its original form.

The City Hall of Arecibo is typical of these regional seats of government. It is relatively modest in size, of stuccoed masonry, with an academically correct composition, having a pedimented center pavilion which projects slightly. The lower story is rusticated, with arched openings; the three doorways in the center giving the effect of a loggia. The upper windows all have segmental pediments and balconies; the central trio share one long balcony. Architectural detailing is modest, but the building is graceful and charming.

In 1898 the Spaniards built the Punta Los Morrillos Lighthouse. It was automated in 1964 and is still in use. A small park, Arecibo Lighthouse and Historical Park, has been established around it.

The Arecibo Observatory was the home of Arecibo Telescope, once the largest single-aperture radio telescope ever constructed and one of the world's most powerful radar-radio telescopes. The observatory's purpose was to support scientific studies. It attracted several Hollywood directors who have filmed there; most recently GoldenEye and Contact. The radio telescope was used in 1974 to send the Arecibo message to space. The already damaged telescope totally collapsed in 2020. Casa Ulanga was originally a residence built by Spanish immigrant Francisco Ulanga, and has served multiple uses over the years. It was used as a bank, store, city hall of Arecibo, hospital, jail, tribunal, and is now operated as the Arecibo Cultural Center.

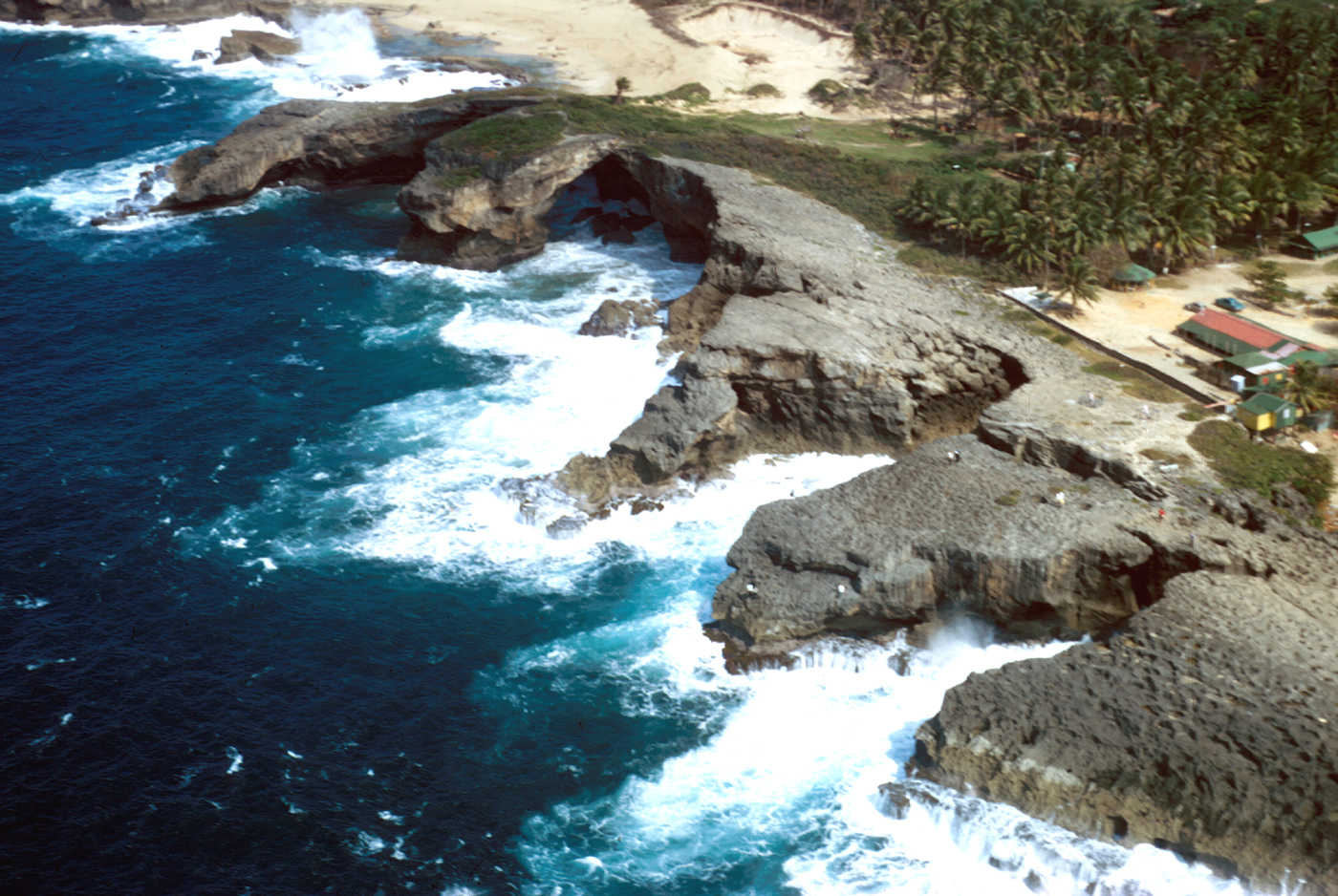
Aerial view of Cueva del Indio, c. 1967

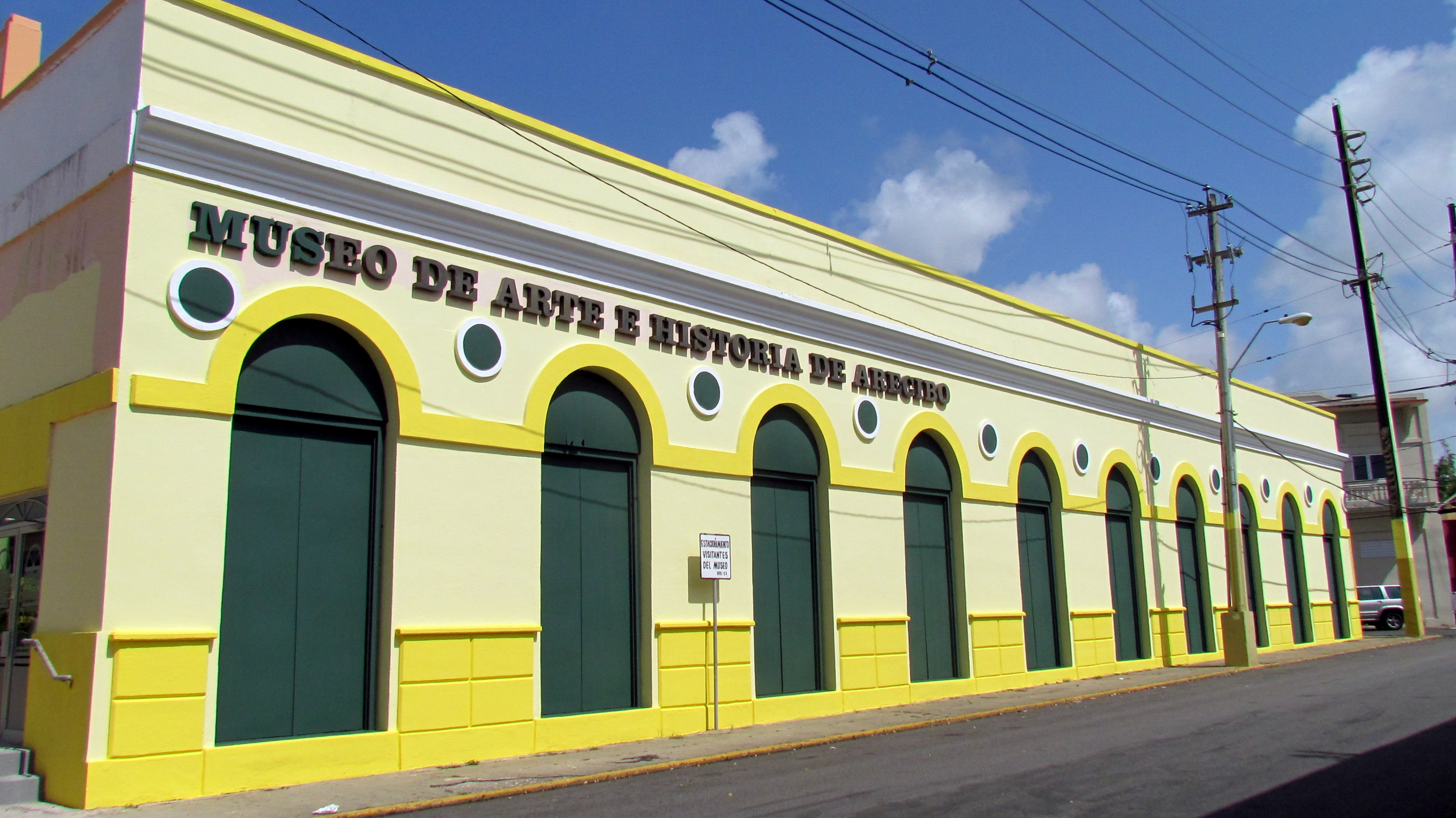
Museum of Art and History of Arecibo

Cueva del Indio is an archaeological site where Taíno drawings can be found.

The "Birth of the New World" is a statue depicting Christopher Columbus and is located in Islote, Arecibo. 295 ft (90 m). The statue is the work of Russian sculptor Zurab Tsereteli, and it is the tallest statue in the Americas.

Other places of interest in Arecibo include:

- The Cambalache Forest Reserve
- Dos Bocas Lake which is a reservoir located between the municipalities of Arecibo and Utuado.
- Paseo Victor Rojas (Victor Rojas Walk) also known as Paseo de Damas or simply El Fuerte, was built in 1881 where the Fort San Miguel's ruins once were
- Manuel "Petaca" Iguina Coliseum which is home of the Arecibo Captains basketball team.
- Museum of Art and History of Arecibo which has art from local artists and shows the city's history

Arecibo beaches include Los Morillos, Los Negritos, Poza del Obispo, and Las Tunas. Pozo del Obispo Beach in Arecibo is considered a dangerous beach.

To stimulate local tourism during the COVID-19 pandemic in Puerto Rico, the Puerto Rico Tourism Company launched the Voy Turistiendo (I'm Touring) campaign in 2021. The campaign featured a passport book with a page for each municipality. The Voy Turisteando Arecibo passport page lists Cueva Ventana, Museo Casa Trina Padilla de Sanz, and the Arecibo Light House and Historical Park, as places of interest.

== Culture ==
=== Festivals and events ===
Arecibo began celebrating its patron saint festival in 1616. Arecibo celebrates its patron saint festival in May. The Fiestas Patronales de San Felipe Apostol is a religious and cultural celebration that generally features parades, games, artisans, amusement rides, regional food, and live entertainment.

Other festivals and events celebrated in Arecibo include:

- Bicycle competition – January
- Festival de Paracaidismo (Parachuting festival) – February
- Arecibo Carnival – February
- Folklore Festival – July
- Beach festival – July
- Artisan Fair – September
- Cetí Festival – November
- Centennial of the Puerto Rican flag – December

=== Sports ===
Arecibo has two professional sports franchises, the Lobos de Arecibo in the Roberto Clemente Professional Baseball League (a.k.a. Liga de Béisbol Profesional Roberto Clemente or LBPRC), and the Capitanes de Arecibo in the National Superior Basketball League (Baloncesto Superior Nacional or BSN).

==== Baseball ====
The Lobos won the 1983 then-known Liga de Béisbol Profesional de Puerto Rico (LBPPR) national baseball championship and the 1983 Caribbean World Series, the only time the franchise won both titles. At that time, they had MLB prospect Dickie Thon, then also of the Houston Astros, on their roster. Thon then suffered a life-threatening and career-affecting eye injury during an Astros game in 1984. The Lobos won a championship again in 1996.

==== Basketball ====
The Capitanes won their first ever BSN national championship in 1959. After that, the Capitanes have not had much luck in their basketball tournaments for the next few decades. However, that would begin to change in 2002, as they started to turn things around, by reaching the BSN semifinals; yet they lost the series to the Vaqueros de Bayamón by losing four straight games, after having a 3–0 series lead, thus failing their chances to make into the finals. In 2005, the Capitanes won the BSN national championship by defeating the Vaqueros de Bayamón in a four-game sweep. This was the first championship in 46 years. In 2007 they got to the finals, losing in the overtime on the seventh game of the series against the Cangrejeros de Santurce. In 2008 Arecibo won their third BSN national championship, this time against the Gigantes de Carolina. In 2010, they won their fourth BSN national title in six seasons, this time against the Vaqueros de Bayamón.

=== Radio stations ===
- WCMN-FM – Hot 102 107.3 FM (re-transmitter)
- WCMN-AM – NotiUno 1280 AM
- WNIK-FM – Super K 106 FM
- WNIK-AM – Radio Unica
- WMIA-AM – MIA Radio Arecibo 1070 AM

== Economy ==
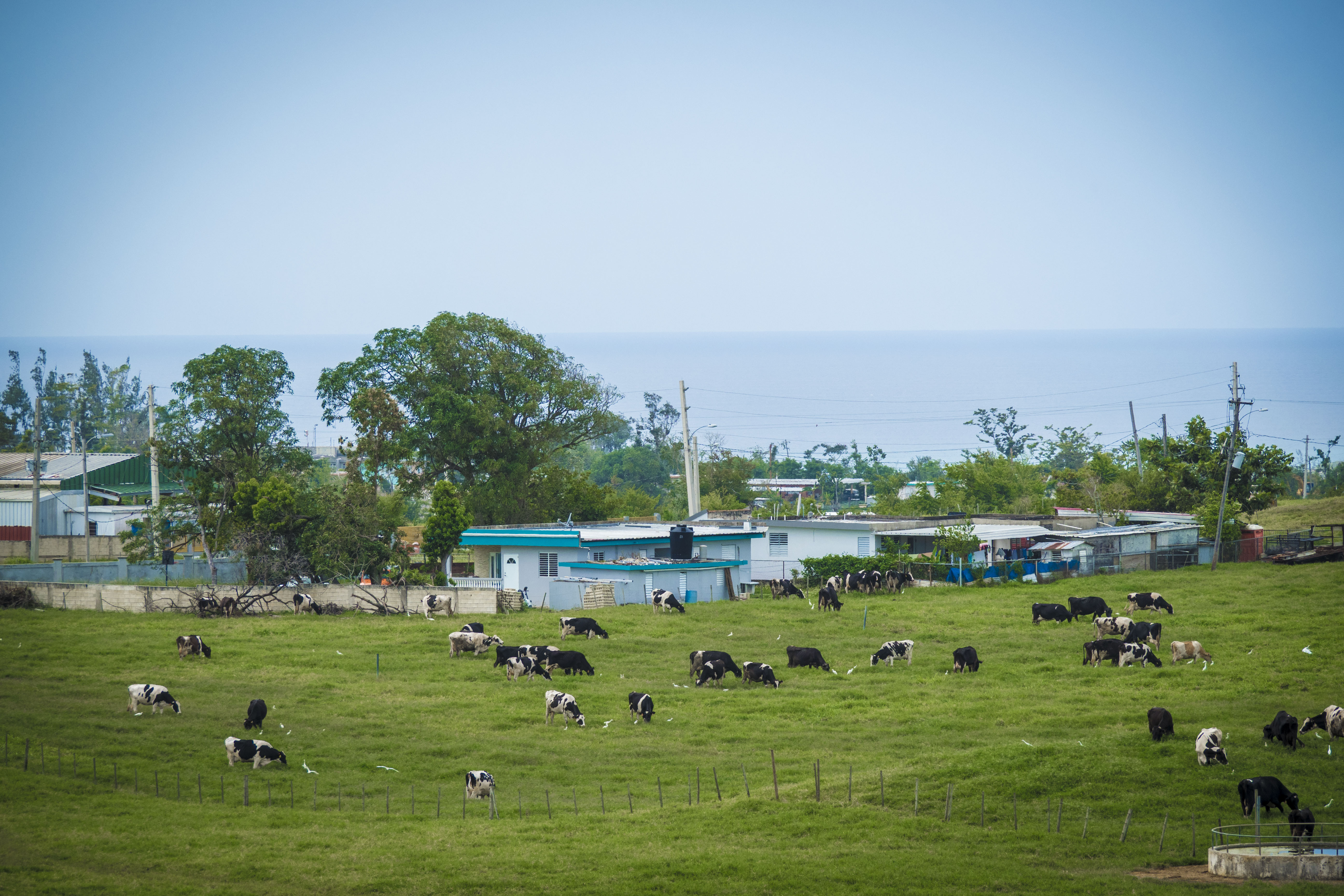
Vaqueria Ceiba Del Mar

Arecibo's economy is diverse with pharmaceuticals, agriculture and fishing. Vaqueria Ceiba Del Mar is located in Arecibo and is one of the largest on the island of Puerto Rico. They also have operations in Hatillo. After Hurricane Maria, the farm had to consolidate their three operations into one.

=== Business ===
Arecibo's main shopping mall is Plaza del Atlantico as well as the one situated in the neighboring municipality of Hatillo, Plaza del Norte.

In 2021, Hilton was constructing a hotel in Arecibo.

=== Industrial ===
Arecibo is home to Fortune 500 corporations such as Merck, General Electric. Other important companies are Thermo King Corporation, Eaton, Los Cidrines, Expressway Eco Printing, Arecibo Tropical Flag and ABB.

== Demographics ==
Historical population
Census	Pop.	Note	%±
1900	36,910		—
1910	42,429		15.0%
1920	46,578		9.8%
1930	56,525		21.4%
1940	69,192		22.4%
1950	75,361		8.9%
1960	69,879		−7.3%
1970	73,468		5.1%
1980	86,766		18.1%
1990	93,385		7.6%
2000	100,131		7.2%
2010	96,440		−3.7%
2020	87,754		−9.0%
2025 (est.)	85,539	▼	−2.5%
U.S. Decennial Census; 1899 (shown as 1900) 1910–1930; 1930–1950 1960–2000 2010 2020

According to the 2010 Census the municipality of Arecibo is 99% Hispanic of which 78% identifies as white (of European descent), 4.6% black (Afro-Puerto Rican descent), and 1.2% with two or more races. The majority of the population is mostly of Spanish descent, but there has been intermarriage with more recent groups from other parts of Europe, with some having Middle Eastern, French, Italian, American or of other descent. People who are multi-racial may also have ancestors more than one of the European groups, and among more than one African nation as well.

Puerto Rico was ceded by Spain in the aftermath of the Spanish–American War under the terms of the Treaty of Paris of 1898 and became a territory of the United States. In 1899, the United States conducted its first census of Puerto Rico finding that the population of Arecibo was 36,910.

== Government ==
All municipalities in Puerto Rico are administered by a mayor, elected every four years. The current mayor of Arecibo is Carlos (Tito) Ramírez Irizarry, of the Popular Democratic Party (PPD). He was first elected at the 2020 general elections.

The city belongs to the Puerto Rico Senatorial district III, which is represented by two Senators. In 2024, Brenda Pérez Soto and Gabriel González, both from the New Progressive Party (PNP), were elected as District Senators.

== Symbols ==
The municipio has an official flag and coat of arms. The flag and coat of arms were adopted in 1968 with Resolution 12 passed by the government of Arecibo.

=== Flag ===
The flag of Arecibo derives its composition and colors from the coat of arms of the city. It is divided vertically in two equal parts. The left side is blue having a belt that stands for "Captain Correa", a local military hero from Spanish times. The right side is made up of blue and yellow diamonds alternating in a checkerboard pattern referring to the coat of arms of Felipe de Beaumont y Navarra, governor of Puerto Rico (1614–1620) and founder of the city. The crown represents The Cacique (chieftain) Arasibo (Fransico Jamaica Arasibo). The turtles represent the ancientness of the city (the third city of Puerto Rico) also because of the indigenous people of the region and that the hunting of turtles was a source of wealth. The towers were a form to describe the population of a settlement. Three towers represent a municipality, four towers represent a village, and five towers represent a city.

=== Coat of arms ===
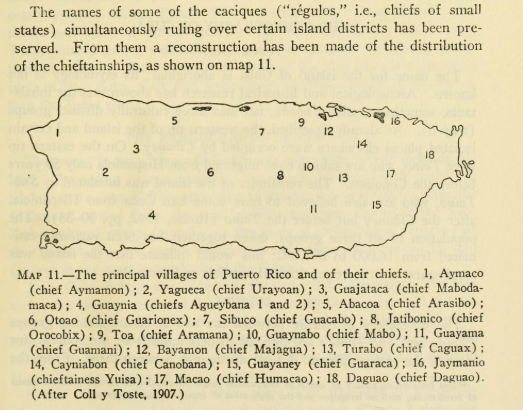
1901 map of Puerto Rico by The Smithsonian, which shows cacique chieftains, including (#5) the area of Arecibo managed by Chief Arasibo

The shield is divided by diagonal lines in golden and blue rhombuses with a blue stripe in the superior part, in which resides an opened five-point crown and which is adorned with drawings characterizing the art of the Taínos. The people of Arecibo also honored Captain Antonio de los Reyes Correa by including a gold colored belt in their coat of arms with the words "Muy Leal", which means "Very Faithful", in representation of Correa. This combination of symbols represents the Indian Cacique (Chieftain) from whom the population's name derives, the governor that erected the town and the hero Captain Correa who defended the town from a British invasion.

=== Nicknames ===
Arecibo is known as "La Villa del Capitán Correa" (Captain Correa's Villa) after the Puerto Rican hero Captain Antonio de los Reyes Correa of the Spanish Army, who drove off a British Navy invasion by ambushing forces led by rear-admiral William Whetstone. Arecibo is also known as "El Diamante Del Norte" (The Diamond of the North).

== Transportation ==
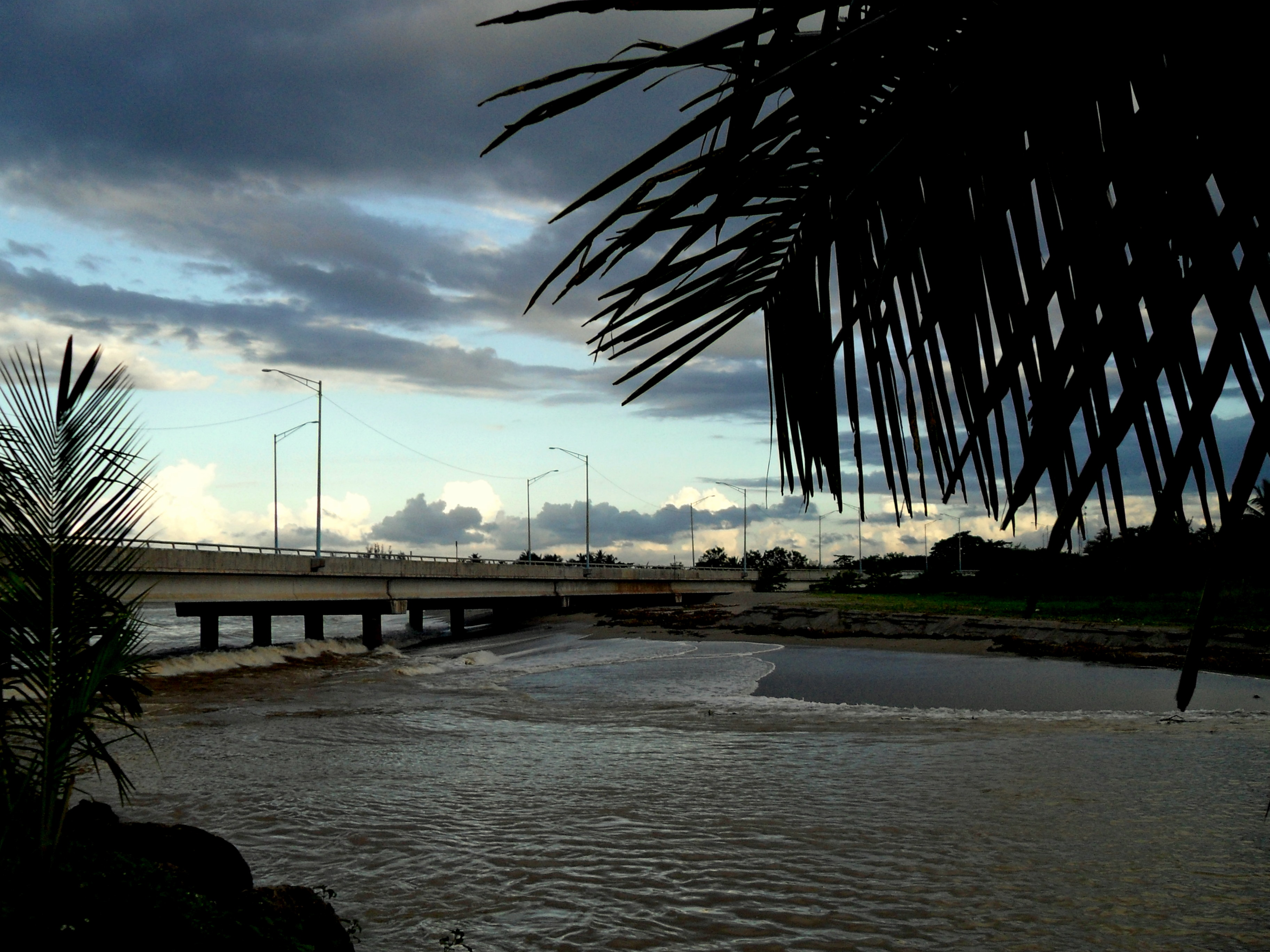
Victor Rojas Bridge, had collapsed in 1998 with the forces from Hurricane Georges

Arecibo has a small noncommercial airport, named Antonio (Nery) Juarbe Pol Airport, which currently has no commercial airline flights.

PR-22 (unsigned Interstate PR-2) passes through the city, but bypasses downtown. Downtown can be accessed via PR-2, PR-10 and PR-129.

There are 51 bridges in Arecibo.

The Puente Victor Rojas collapsed during Hurricane Georges in 1998 but was rebuilt. Despite it being an important bridge leading into the urban downtown center of Arecibo, it was closed again in early 2017 due to damage caused by the sea and reopened in 2021 after repairs.

== Education ==
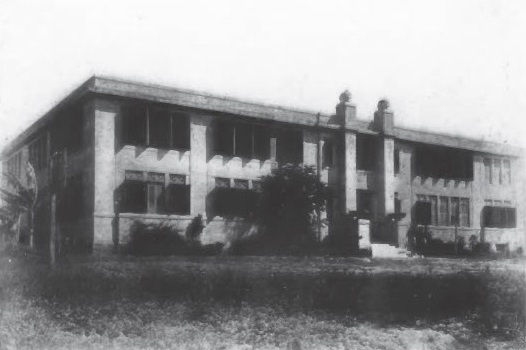
A high school in Arecibo, c. 1920

The first school in Arecibo was established on October 12, 1805.

Today, Arecibo is home to several public and private schools distributed through its barrios. Public education is handled by the State Department of Education. There are also several colleges and universities located in the city including:

- University of Puerto Rico at Arecibo
- Interamerican University of Puerto Rico
- Pontifical Catholic University of Puerto Rico
- National University College

It also has several other technical institutions like ICPR Junior College.

== Notable people ==
The following is a list of notable people from Arecibo:

- Antonio de los Reyes Correa – military hero
- Arasibo – Taino Cacique
- Cayetano Coll y Cuchí – the first President of Puerto Rico House of Representatives
- Cayetano Coll y Toste – historian
- Delma S. Arrigoitia – author
- Edna Coll – educator
- Francisco Gonzalo Marín – poet who fought for Cuba's independence
- Isabel Cuchí Coll – journalist
- José Coll y Cuchí – politician; founder of Puerto Rican Nationalist Party
- Luisa Capetillo – union leader/civil rights activist
- Manuel Zeno Gandía – author
- María Cadilla – educator
- Melba Acosta – Secretary of Treasury of PR
- Myrta Silva – singer
- René Marqués – playwright
- Ruben Natal-San Miguel – photographer
- Iann Dior – Rapper and singer
- Vanya Quiñones - university president

== Gallery ==
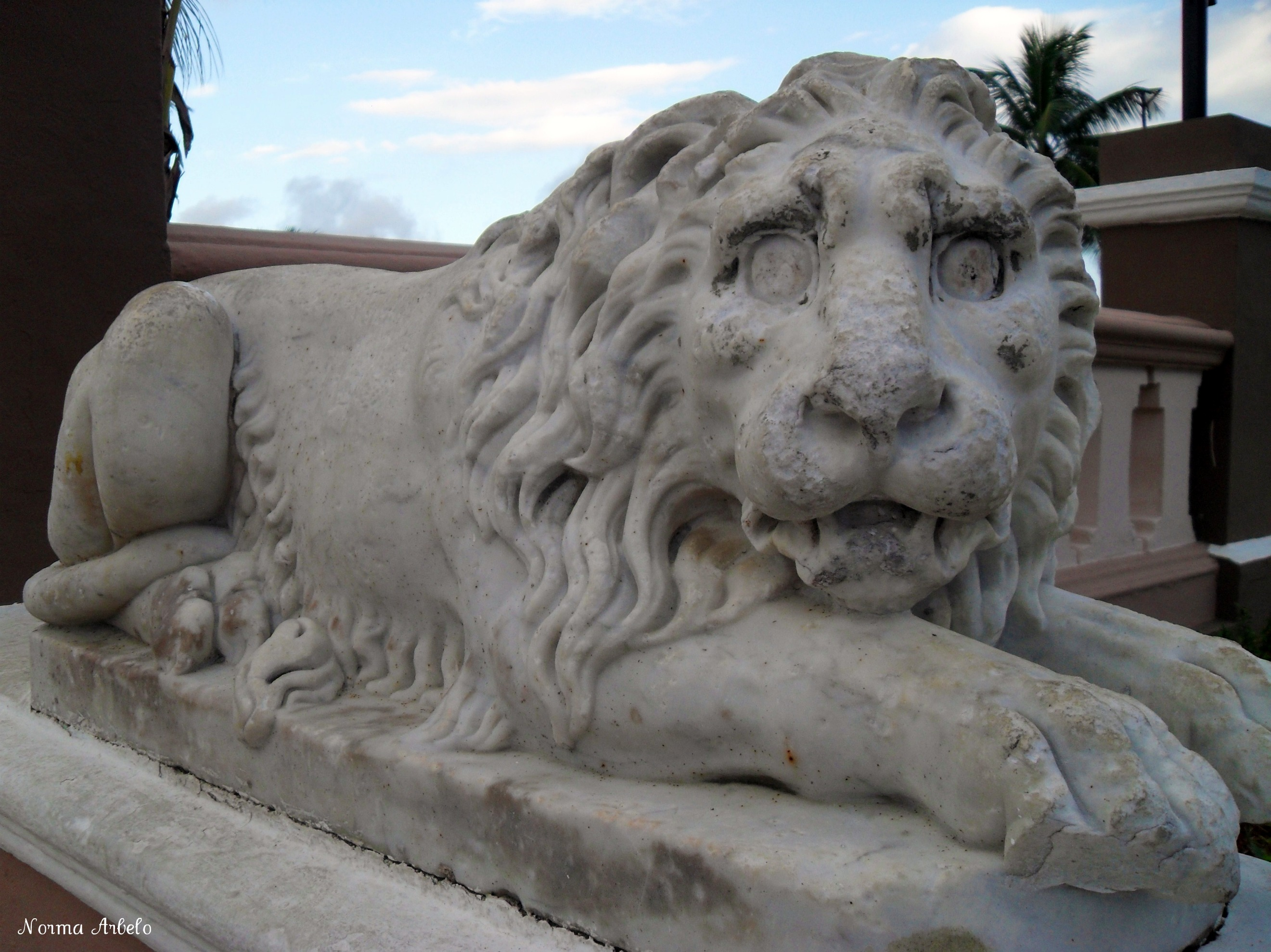
Lion in Plaza Colón

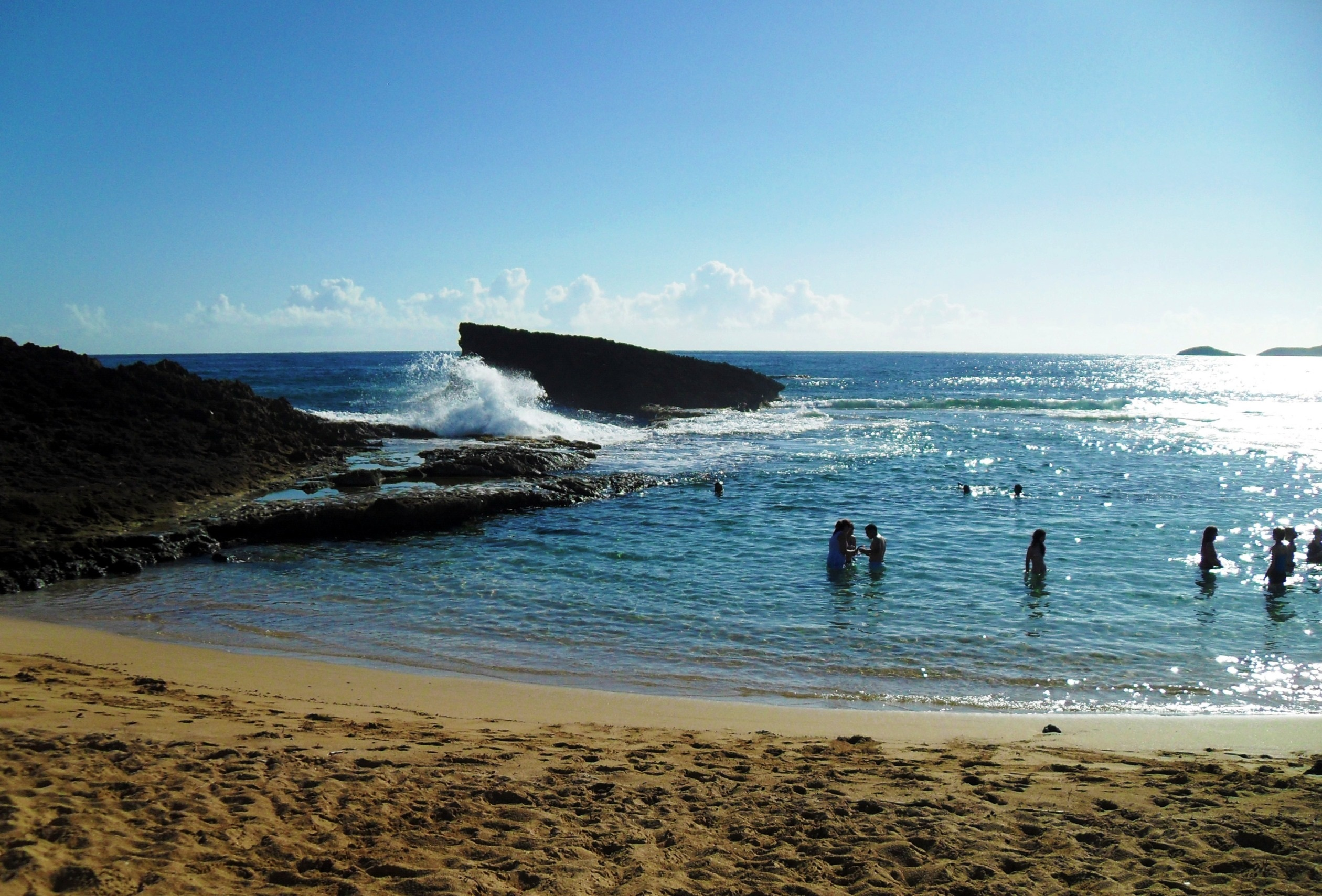
Playa La Poza del Obispo in Arecibo

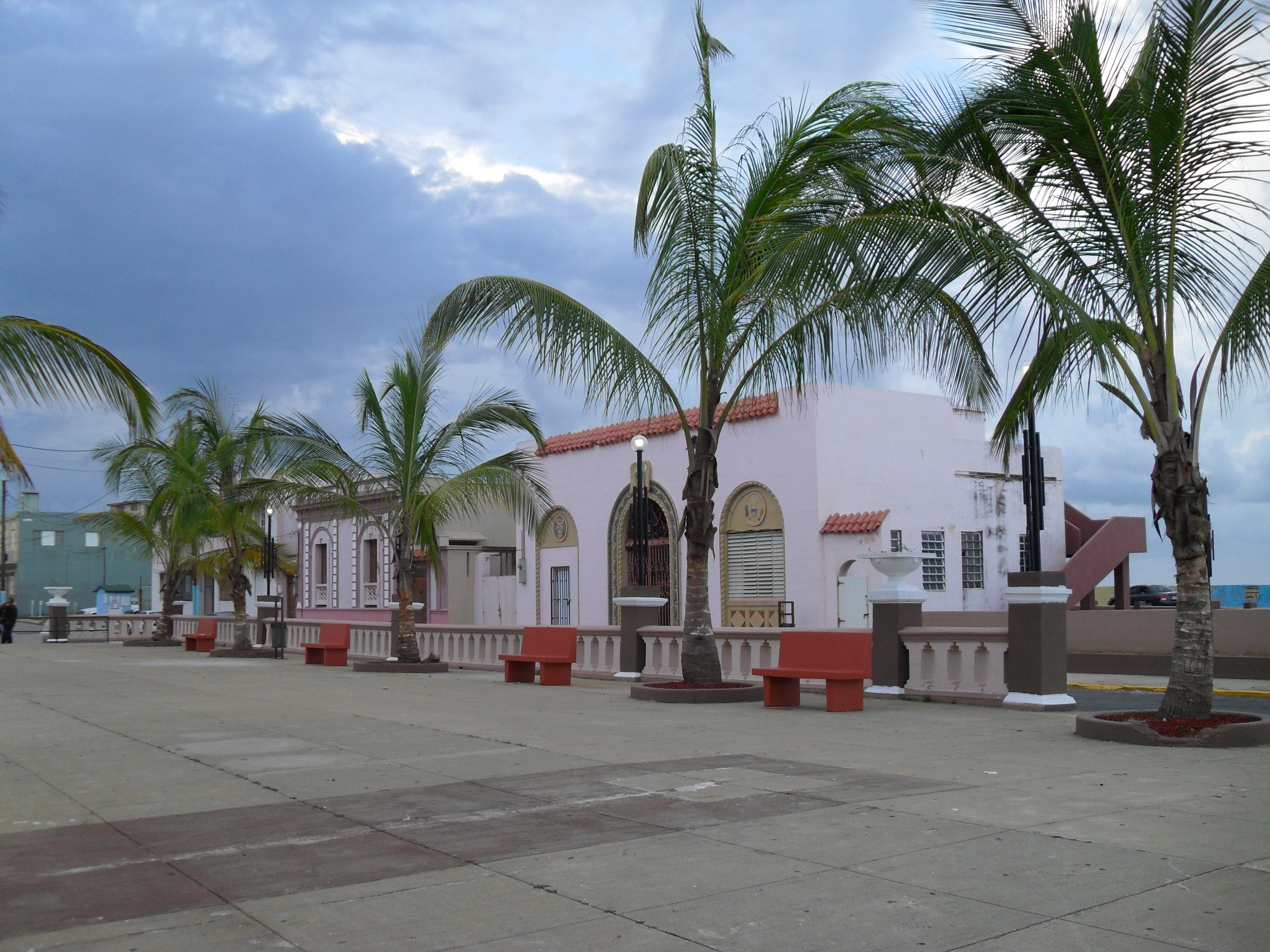
Buildings in Plaza Colon in Arecibo downtown (pueblo)

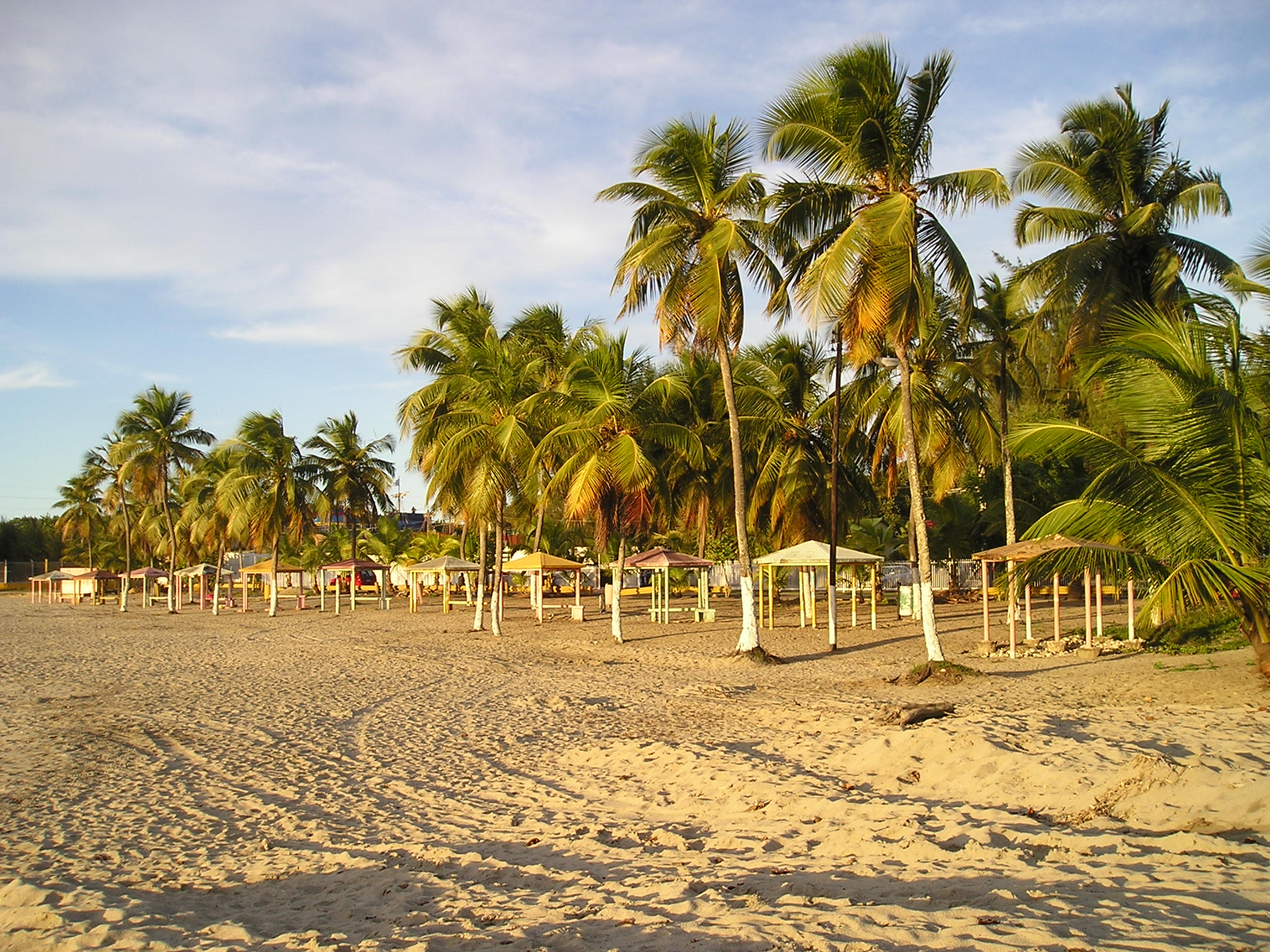
A beach in Arecibo

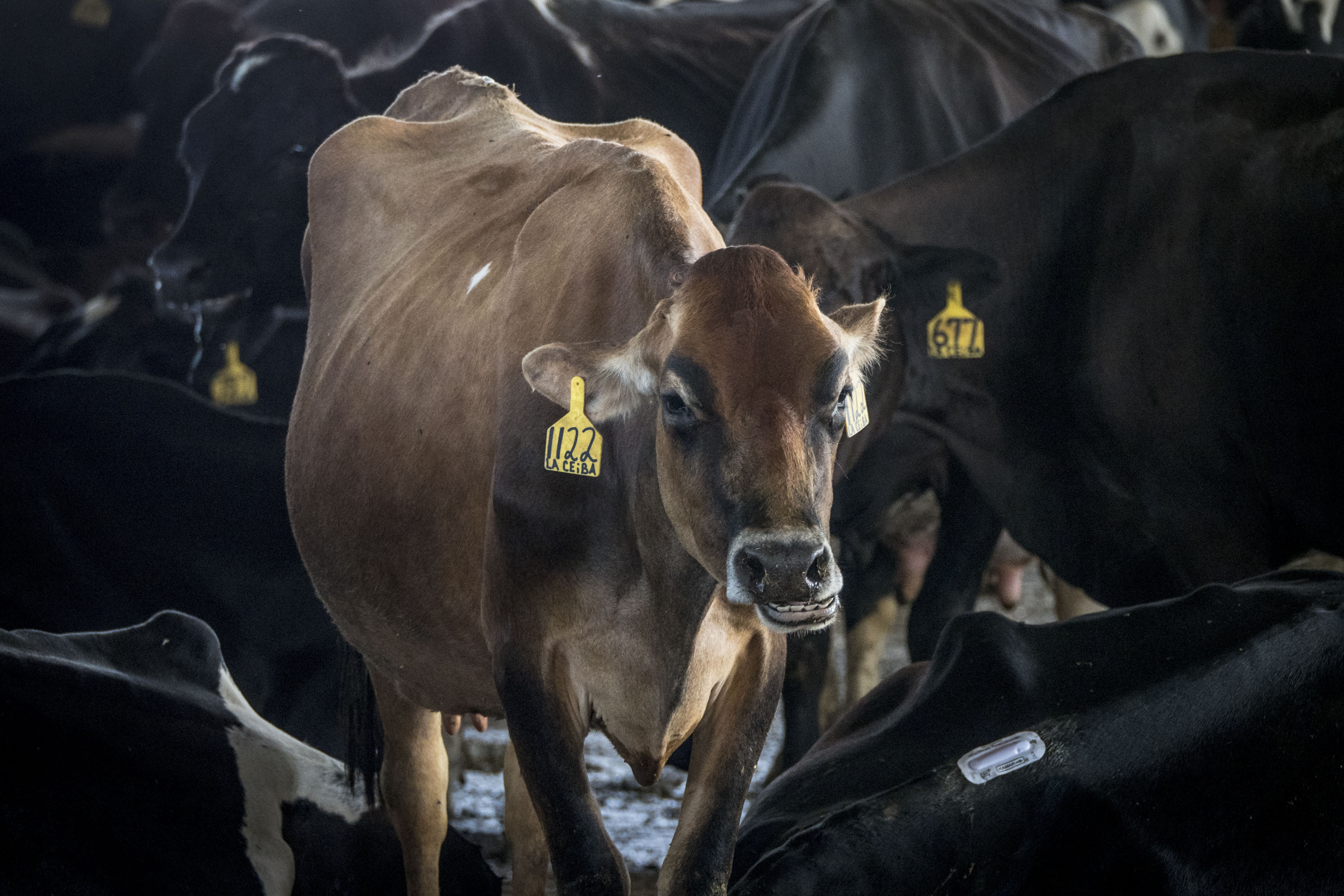
Cow from Vaquería Ceiba Del Mar in Arecibo

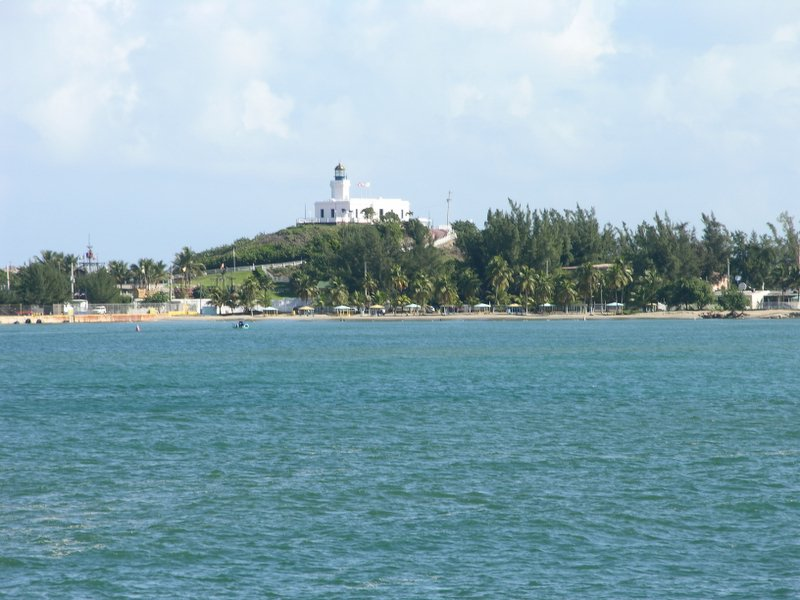
Punta los Morrillos lighthouse

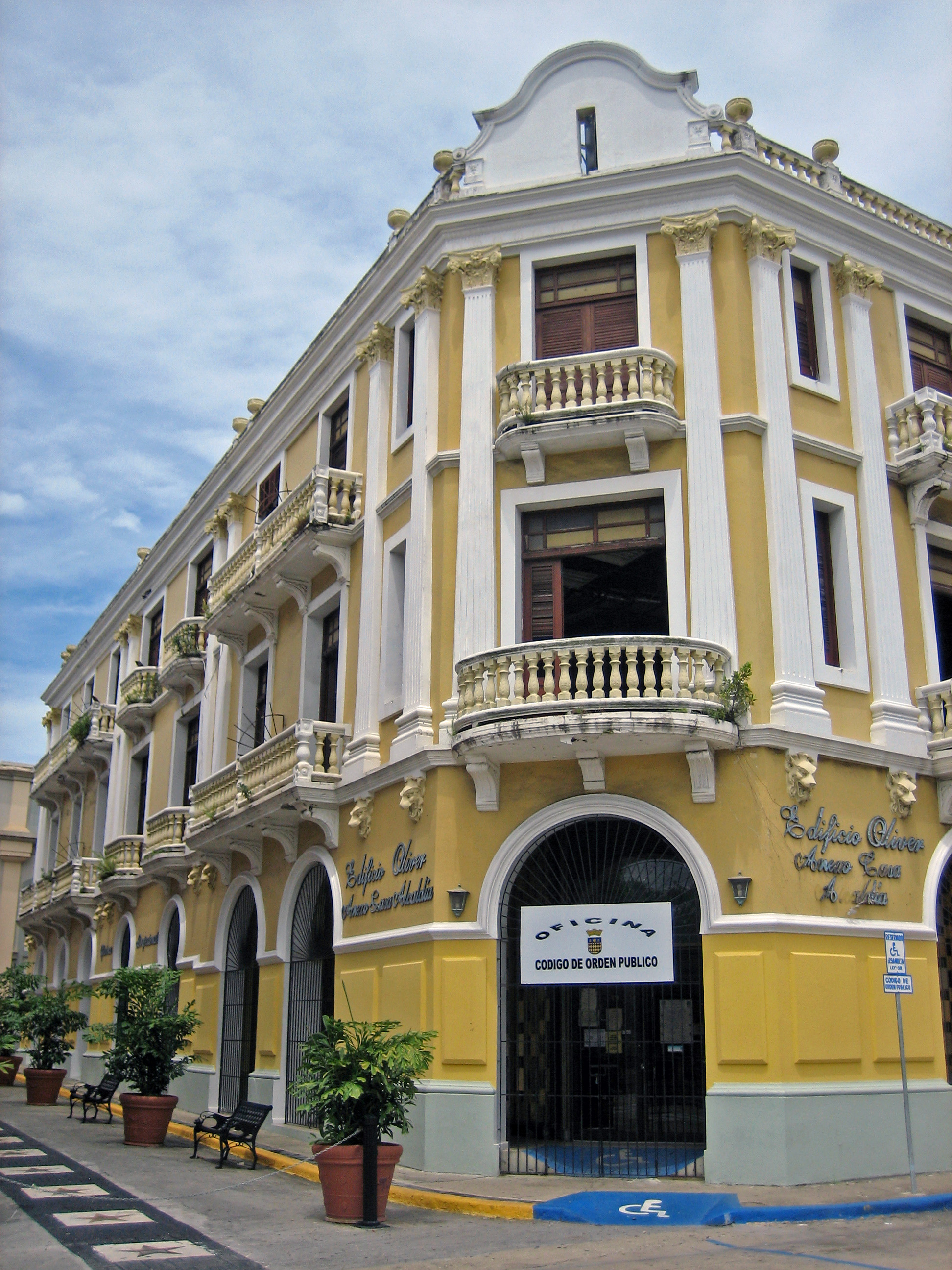
Edificio Oliver
