= Antonio de los Reyes Correa =

Puerto Rican officer in the Spanish Marine Infantry

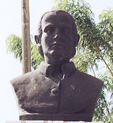
- Capt. Antonio de los Reyes Correa
- Born: c. 1665; Arecibo, Puerto Rico, Spanish Empire
- Died: June 9, 1758; Arecibo, Puerto Rico
- Military career
- Allegiance: Spanish Marine Infantry
- Rank: Captain
- Nickname: El Capitan Correa
- Commands: The Arecibo militia
- Awards: "La Medalla de Oro de la Real Efigie" (The Gold Medal of the Royal Image)

Antonio de los Reyes Correa (c. 1665 – June 9, 1758), also known as El Capitán Correa, was a Puerto Rican native who served as a captain in the Spanish Marine Infantry. Correa was born in Arecibo, Puerto Rico to José Rodríguez Correa and Francisca Rodriguez de Valdez Colón. He was in charge of the local militia whose mission was to protect Arecibo from attacks by pirates or other European powers. His claim to fame came as a result of his defense of the city from an attack by English forces on August 5, 1702.

On August 5, 1702, two Royal Navy warships under the command of William Whetstone approached Arecibo. From them, two rowboats transporting 40 marines and sailors proceeded to land on the town's beach. A force of 30 local militiamen, led by Correa, was mustered to confront the invaders. The English landing force suffered 22 casualties while eight men onboard Whetstone's ships were killed or wounded by Spanish artillery fire. The defenders suffered one killed and three wounded, including Correa. Whetstone's ships withdrew, ending the engagement.

Correa was awarded La Medalla de Oro de la Real Efigie (lit. "The Gold Medal of the Royal Effigy"), by King Philip V of Spain and given the title of "Captain of Infantry" on September 23, 1703. It was within Spanish tradition to name its Captain of Infantry to the position of Mayor. Correa served as temporary mayor of Arecibo from 1700 to 1701 and then as official mayor from 1701 to 1705. He also served as mayor from 1710 to 1714 and from 1716 to 1744. Correa, who was married to Estefanía Rodríguez de Matos y Colón Luyando, died on June 9, 1758.

== Early years ==
Correa was born to José Rodríguez Correa, a Portuguese immigrant, and Francisca Rodríguez de Valdés, the daughter of a military captain. His father was enrolled in the Puerto Ricon militia in Arecibo and was able to acquire an estate. He was one of three children, including his brother Martín and his sister, Bárbara Correa. Correa was born around 1665, by his own account. (Note: Coll y Toste erroneously dated his birth to 1680, a mistake reprinted by other authors.) Documents detailing his youth and early military career are scarce, both in local and transatlantic archives. The actual reason for this is unknown, it may have been due to his origins or because of a low military profile prior to his defense of the settlement. This lack of documentation has caused some the proliferation of some questionable information. The first mention of his existence was in military papers dated to the final decade of the century and detailing how he donated a cow to the Puerto Rican Guarda Costa vessels.

Correa married Estefanía Rodríguez de Matos y Colón Luyano, who was related to the founders of Coamo. Their children were named José, Felipe, Francisco, María Magdalena, Ana Antonia, Antonia, Pepa, María de las Nieves, Cayetano, Nicolás, Isabel, Francisca and María del Rosario. Correa enlisted his sons in the Puerto Rican militia when they came of age. In December 1691, Correa was among the militiamen recruited to defend the city of Puerto Rico (modern-day San Juan) following a military riot. He was one of only three militiamen that did not desert due to sympathy, remaining active until the rebellion was quelled later that month. On 22 June 1698, Correa was promoted to the rank of Sergeant major. His previous military offices are unknown due to contemporary loss of the Spanish registries. However, it is known that he served at least 20 consecutive years without taking a license.

Following the death of Arecibo's War Lieutenant in 1701, Correa took over the role as interim officer. Gaining a reputation for opposing contraband instead of cooperating with it as was the case with other Spanish officers, a letter was sent to the governor who requested an investigation which lead to the intervention against several individuals including the town's priest. He remained as Sargento mayor until February 4, 1701, when he received permanency as the municipality's assigned War Lieutenant.

== Defense of Arecibo ==
As part of the War of the Spanish Succession, England was at war with pro-Bourbon Spaniards, and the conflict spilled over into the Americas. On August 5, 1702, Correa led the defense of Arecibo after an English vessel landed on the coast and tried to invade the town. The invaders used a brigantine (bergantin) and a sloop with a force of around 30, but they were received by the local settlers, which killed 22 on land and several more at sea during the retreat including their captain. Following this incursion, governor Gabriel Gutierres de la Riva wrote to the Crown requesting recognitions for the involved. A year later, the Junta de Guerra de Indias seconded the request and proposed granting the Medalla de la Real Efige. On September 28, 1703, King Phillip V of Spain granted Correa the gold medal and received recognition as Captain of the Spanish Infantry. The following year, the officer sent a letter to the Crown thanking it for the recognition, but also informing them of health issues and requesting economic help for his family. On December 21, 1705, he received the compensation requested.

== Later years ==
Arecibo Coat of Arms

After Spain entered into a war with Portugal, the Spanish confiscated the belongings of the Portuguese residents at Puerto Rico. Consequently, Correa arrested his own father and expropriated his estate. This granted him the favor of the authorities, including the governor who requested the release of José Correa due to his status as a settled citizen and the service of his children to the Crown. Correa remained Arecibo's War Lieutenant until September 23, 1705. On May 24, 1710, Correa returned to the role of War Captain and held the office until April 17, 1714. His wife died shortly afterwards, during the summer of 1715.

Later he wrote to the Spanish Crown complaining that he had been removed of his office without consideration and due to fraudulent health issues. On August 31, 1716, Correa testified that governor Juan de Rivera had replaced him with Nicolás Serrano after receiving a bribe of 200 and he only consented to the move due to loyalty. On December 17, 1716, Correa returned to the office of Arecibo's War Lieutenant, retaining the title throughout numerous administrations. In August 1717, Martín and his wife were the godparents of his son Francisco's wedding. His influence extended beyond Arecibo and his wealth was sufficient to possess terrains in modern-day Camuy and raise cattle in them. Correa was involved in the foundation of the municipality of Utuado, being assigned by governor Matías de Abadía to evaluate the resources of the area, offering a positive assessment. In 1733, Correa served as the godfather of Isabel's first child, with whom he shared his name. His other children, Nicolás and Felipe, joined the Catholic clergy.

Correa served as an officer at Arecibo until a hiatus on July 22, 1737, later adding six more years. On April 16, 1644, he retired due to his age and health. His son, José, inherited the position and gained permanency some years later. (Note: Coll y Toste lists his grandchild of the same name as the actual successor, as do other authors that cite his work.) In 1749, María Magdalena (who became a nun) retrieved his service record, allowing for a copy to be preserved for posterity. The following year, she was granted a regular payment due to the achievements of the retired Captain, in other to maintain both of them.

Correa died in 1758 after receiving the Catholic sacraments due to his condition, being buried on June 10. He left money assigned for two Church institutions and as payment for the funeral masses, a portion for his nephew (also named José) and more to distribute to the poor. The following year, his son José requested that the recognitions and benefits of his father were passed to him, in order to maintain his family due to his age. Some of his children remained active in the Puerto Rican militia, with José and Francisco having reached at least the rank of captain. Both of them left direct descendants, as did Isabel and Francisca from marriages with militiamen. According to Cayetano Coll y Toste, his grandson Agustín Correa sold the gold medal awarded to him in 1836. Several of his descendants held political positions throughout the 18th century, most serving the Cabildo de San Juan.

Several of his grandchildren continued the pattern set by their predecessors, enlisting in the Puerto Rican militia or joining the Catholic clergy. His descendants are widespread throughout Puerto Rico, with some conserving the last name Correa at least four generations later. Several other direct bloodlines emerged from the marriages of his daughters, despite abandoning the acumen. Among his distant descendants was author Manuel Zeno Gandía.

== Legacy ==
Arecibo is known as the "Villa del Capitan Correa" (Captain Correa's Village), an honour bestowed by the people of the town. The people of Arecibo also honored Correa by including a gold colored belt in their Coat of Arms with the words "Muy Leal", which means "Very Loyal", in representation of Correa. On January 8, 2004, the Government of Puerto Rico approved public law #29 (P. de la C. 4029 LEY NUM. 29. 8 DE ENERO DE 2004) establishing August 5 as the Day of Antonio de los Reyes Correa. In the southern Puerto Rican city of Ponce a street was named after him. It runs from Barrio Segundo through Barrio Primero and ends in the northern portion of Barrio Canas Urbano at Avenida Las Américas.

== See also ==
- List of Puerto Ricans
- List of Puerto Rican military personnel
