= Bajadero, Puerto Rico =

Community in Puerto Rico

Bajadero
- Community
- Location within Puerto Rico
- Coordinates: 18°25′24″N 66°40′37″W
- Commonwealth: Puerto Rico
- Municipality: Arecibo
- Elevation: 259 ft (79 m)

Population (2010)
  - Total: 3,710
- Source: 2010 Census
- Time zone: UTC−4 (AST)
- Postal code: 00616

Bajadero is a community in the municipality of Arecibo, Puerto Rico. Its population in 2010 was 3,710. Three barrios border each other and each contains a section of the community. The Bajadero community in the barrio of Arenalejos had a population of 2,380 in 2010. The Bajadero community in the barrio of Carreras had a population of 64 in 2010 and the Bajadero community in the barrio of Domingo Ruíz had a population of 1,266 in 2010. There is a U.S. Post office in the community of Bajadero and its zip code is 00616.

== See also ==
- List of communities in Puerto Rico
- List of barrios and sectors of Arecibo, Puerto Rico
