= Cambalache Bridge =

Historic bridge in Arecibo, Puerto Rico

- U.S. National Register of Historic Places
- Puerto Rico Historic Sites and Zones
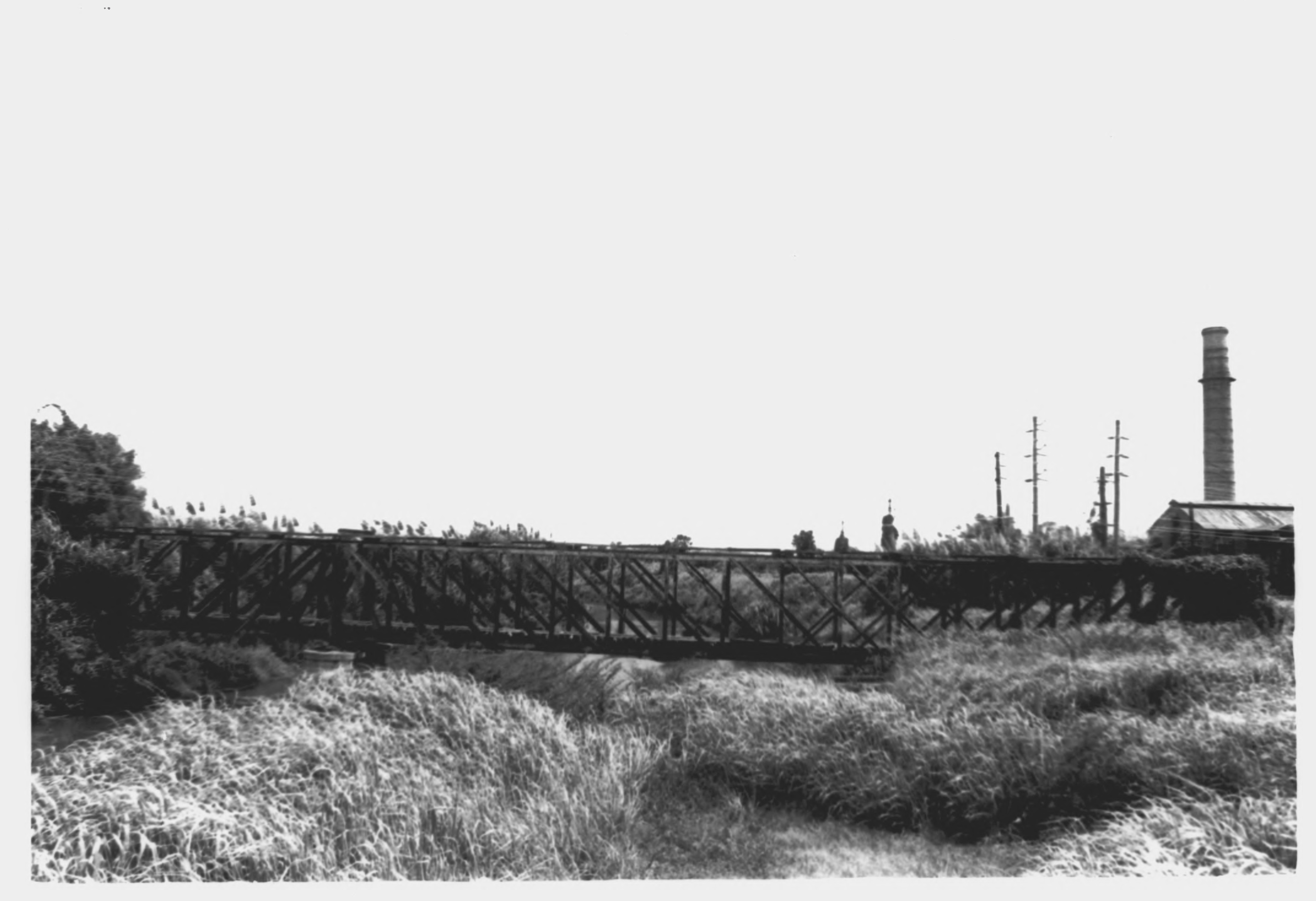
- Cambalache Bridge in 2010

- Location within Puerto Rico
- Nearest city: Arecibo, Puerto Rico
- Coordinates: 18°27′20″N 66°42′09″W
- Area: less than one acre
- Built: 1893
- Built by: Compañia de Ferrocariles de Puerto Rico (CFPR)
- Architectural style: double intersection pratt tr
- MPS: Historic Bridges of Puerto Rico MPS
- NRHP reference No.: 95000831
- RNSZH No.: 2000-(RN)-20-JP-SH

Significant dates
- Added to NRHP: July 19, 1995
- Designated RNSZH: December 21, 2000

Cambalache Bridge or Puente Francés is a bridge built in 1893 which spans the Río Grande de Arecibo from Cambalache barrio to Tanamá barrio in Arecibo. It is located 100 meters west of Puerto Rico Highway 2, at kilometer 72.

Like all bridges of the Compañía de Ferrocarriles de Puerto Rico, the steel to build it was imported from France. The train section from San Juan to Arecibo was completed in 1891, but it was not until 1893 that the Cambalache Bridge, spanning the river, was completed. Before the opening of the Cambalache Bridge, the train ended at Cambalache and passengers and cargo had to cross a temporary wooden bridge on horse or by ox cart. The construction of the Cambalache Bridge, also called the French Bridge, was an important connection for train transport between the cities of the north coast and the estates of Arecibo.

The structure of the Cambalache bridge has not undergone significant alterations since its period of greater historical importance and has maintained a degree of integrity in its design, workmanship, materials and setting. The train route is still used for agricultural purposes.

The bridge was listed on the U.S. National Register of Historic Places on July 19, 1995, and on the Puerto Rico Register of Historic Sites and Zones on December 21, 2000.

== See also ==
- National Register of Historic Places listings in northern Puerto Rico
