= Arenalejos, Arecibo, Puerto Rico =

Barrio of Puerto Rico

Arenalejos
- Barrio
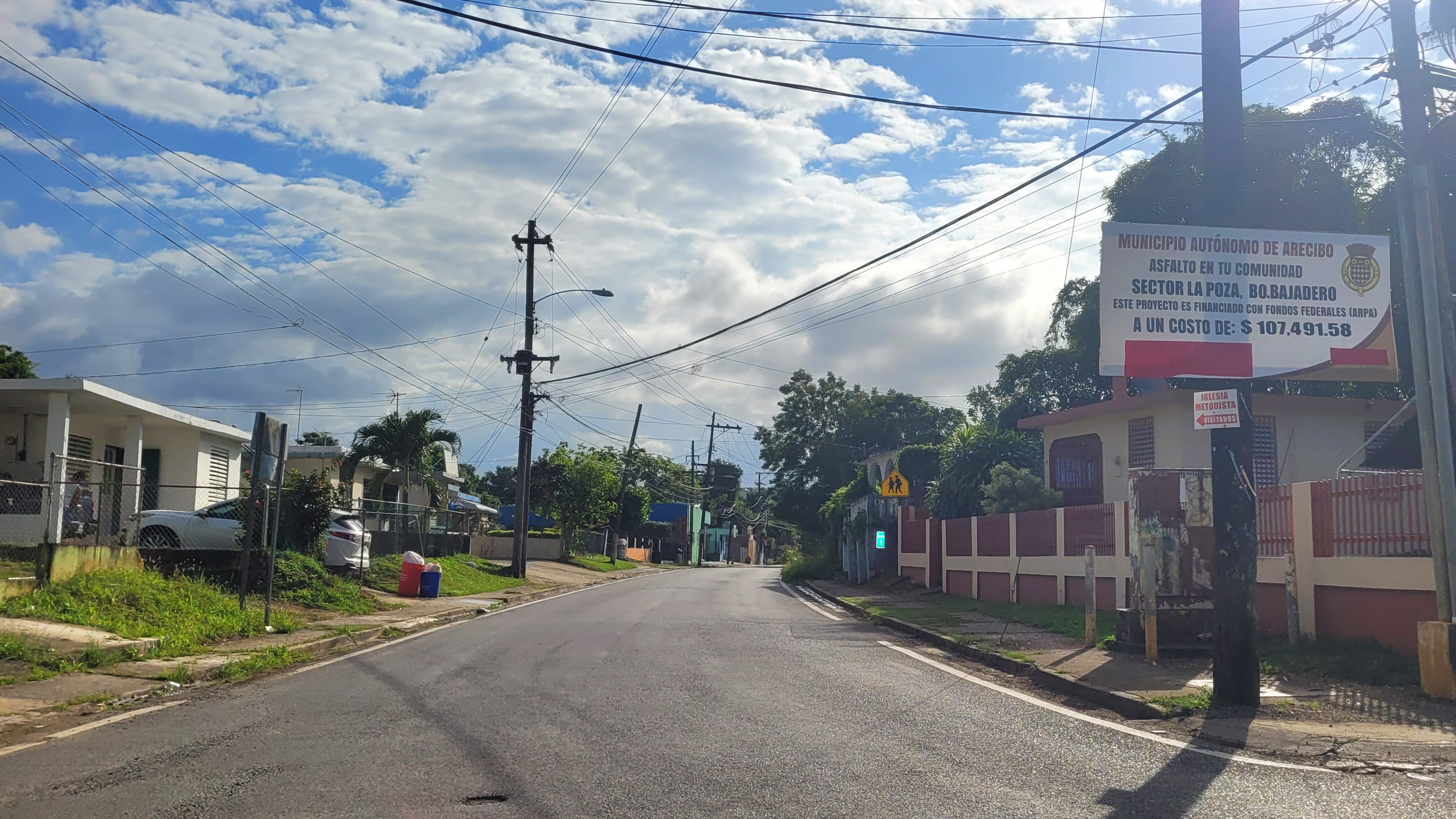
- Puerto Rico Highway 656 between Domingo Ruíz and Arenalejos

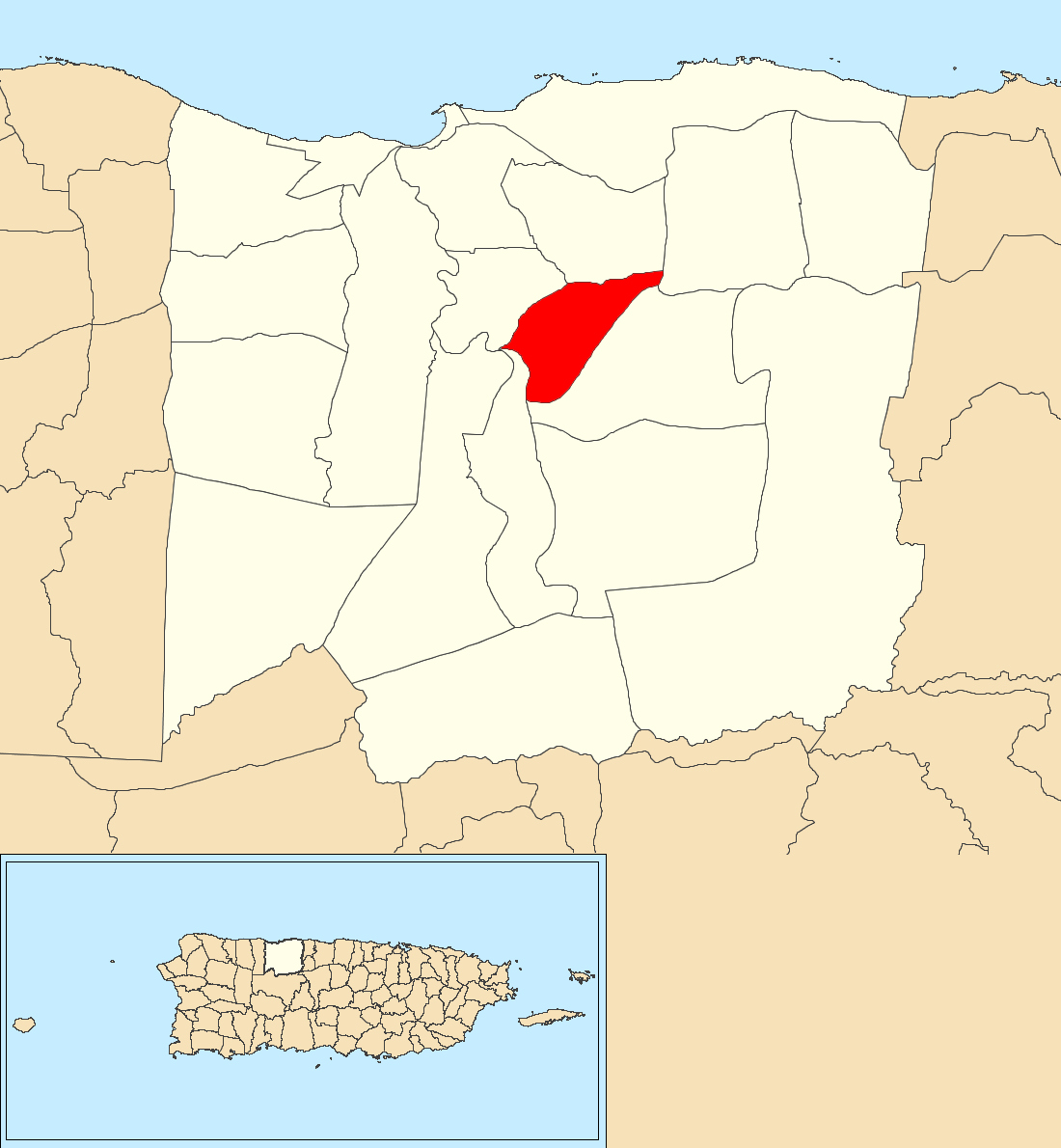
- Location of Arenalejos within the municipality of Arecibo shown in red

- Location of Puerto Rico
- Coordinates: 18°25′36″N 66°40′10″W
- Commonwealth: Puerto Rico
- Municipality: Arecibo

Area
  - Total: 2.53 sq mi (6.6 km^{2})
  - Land: 2.53 sq mi (6.6 km^{2})
  - Water: 0.00 sq mi (0 km^{2})
- Elevation: 200 ft (61 m)

Population (2010)
  - Total: 3,064
  - Density: 1,211.1/sq mi (467.6/km^{2})
- Source: 2010 Census
- Time zone: UTC−4 (AST)
- ZIP Code: 00612

Arenalejos is a barrio in the municipality of Arecibo, Puerto Rico. Its population in 2010 was 3,064. Arenalejos is near the center of Arecibo, west of Miraflores.

== History ==
Arenalejos was in Spain's gazetteers until Puerto Rico was ceded by Spain in the aftermath of the Spanish–American War under the terms of the Treaty of Paris of 1898 and became an unincorporated territory of the United States. In 1899, the United States Department of War conducted a census of Puerto Rico finding that the population of Arenalejos barrio was 1,228.

Historical population
Census	Pop.	Note	%±
1900	1,228		—
1910	1,383		12.6%
1920	1,296		−6.3%
1930	1,743		34.5%
1940	1,984		13.8%
1950	2,169		9.3%
1960	1,946		−10.3%
1970	2,106		8.2%
1980	2,485		18.0%
1990	2,810		13.1%
2000	2,997		6.7%
2010	3,064		2.2%
U.S. Decennial Census; 1899 (shown as 1900) 1910-1930; 1930-1950 1980-2000 2010

== Sectors ==
Barrios (which are, in contemporary times, roughly comparable to minor civil divisions) in turn are further subdivided into smaller local populated place areas/units called sectores (sectors in English). The types of sectores may vary, from normally sector to urbanización to reparto to barriada to residencial, among others.

The following sectors are in Arenalejos barrio:

Calle Guzmán, Calle Oms, Colinas de Arenalejos, Comunidad Bithorn, Comunidad Carriones 1, Comunidad Carriones 2, Comunidad Mena, Égida Miraflores, Jardines de Palo Blanco, Sector Abra Fría, Sector Cielo Tapao, Sector Cuatro Calles, Sector Cuesta Colorá, Sector El Centro, Sector La Poza, Sector Los Pobres, Sector Miradero, Sector Palache, Sector Palo Blanco, Sector Pollera, Sector Rincón Prieto, Sector Tejada, Sector Yahueca, Urbanización Hacienda Monte Verde, Urbanización Mansiones Aztecas, Urbanización Villa Linda, and Urbanización Villa Nicole.

== See also ==
- List of communities in Puerto Rico
- List of barrios and sectors of Arecibo, Puerto Rico
