= List of barrios and sectors of Arecibo, Puerto Rico =

Like all municipalities of Puerto Rico, Arecibo is subdivided into administrative units called barrios, which are, in contemporary times, roughly comparable to minor civil divisions. The barrios and subbarrios, in turn, are further subdivided into smaller local populated place areas/units called sectores (sectors in English). The types of sectores may vary, from normally sector to urbanización to reparto to barriada to residencial, among others. Some sectors appear in two barrios.

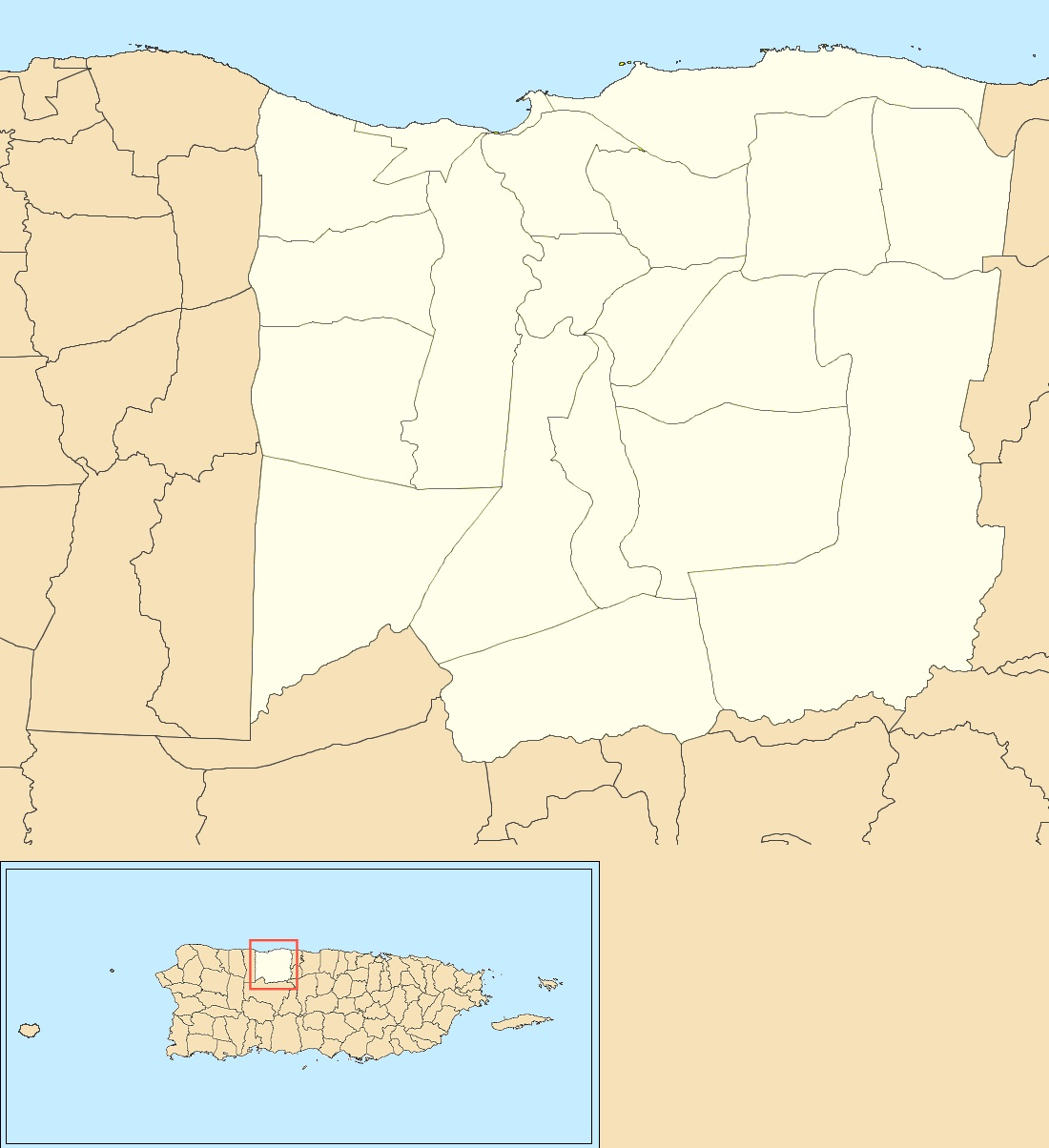
Arecibo map with barrio subdivisions

== List of sectors by barrio ==
=== Arecibo barrio-pueblo ===
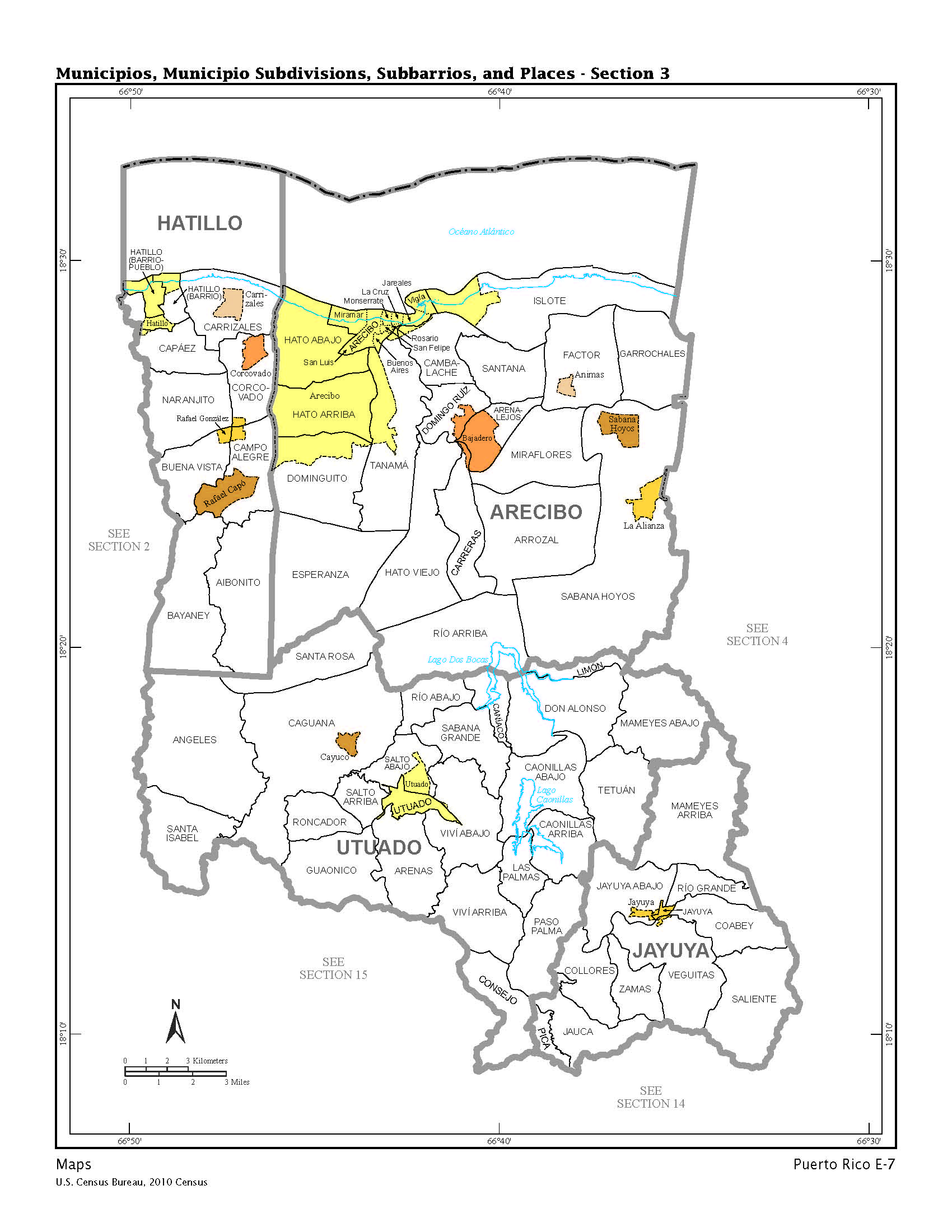
US 2010 Census map of Municipios, Municipio Subdivisions, Subbarrios, and Places of Hatillo, Arecibo, Utuado and Jayuya in Puerto Rico

- Avenida 65 de Infantería
- Avenida Constitución
- Avenida Cotto
- Avenida San Luis
- Calle Los Héroes
- Calles: Ledesma, Cruz Roja, Caribe, Avenida Miramar
- Comunidad Barrio Obrero
- Comunidad La Múcura
- Condominios del Atlántico
- Reparto Cotto Viejo
- Reparto Marquez
- Reparto San Juan
- Residencial Bella Vista
- Residencial Extensión Zeno Gandía
- Residencial Ramón Marín
- Residencial Trina Padilla
- Urbanización Centro Urbano
- Urbanización Radioville
- Urbanización Zeno Gandía

=== Arenalejos ===
- Calle Guzmán
- Calle Oms
- Colinas de Arenalejos
- Comunidad Bithorn
- Comunidad Carriones 1
- Comunidad Carriones 2
- Comunidad Mena
- Égida Miraflores
- Jardines de Palo Blanco
- Sector Abra Fría
- Sector Cielo Tapao
- Sector Cuatro Calles
- Sector Cuesta Colorá
- Sector El Centro
- Sector La Poza
- Sector Los Pobres
- Sector Miradero
- Sector Palache
- Sector Palo Blanco
- Sector Pollera
- Sector Rincón Prieto
- Sector Tejada
- Sector Yahueca
- Urbanización Hacienda Monte Verde
- Urbanización Mansiones Aztecas
- Urbanización Villa Linda
- Urbanización Villa Nicole

=== Arrozal ===
- Sector Las Cántaras
- Sector Los Muertos
- Sector Los Puertos
- Sector Quebrada del Palo
- Sector Varela
- Sector Zenón Rivera

=== Cambalache ===
- Callejón Cancela
- Comunidad Domingo Ruiz
- Finca Las Claras
- Sector Santa Bárbara
- Urbanización Brisas del Valle

=== Carreras ===
- Sector Carreras I
- Sector Carreras II
- Sector Cuesta Biáfara
- Sector Jagual
- Sector Jurutungo

=== Domingo Ruíz ===
- Calle Los Olmos
- Calle Severo Ocasio
- Comunidad Buena Vista
- Comunidad Pueblo Nuevo
- Comunidad Villa Kennedy
- Sector Bajadero
- Sector Cuesta Manatí
- Sector El Maga
- Silverio Apartments

=== Dominguito ===
- Calle Estremera
- Camino Estemera
- Comunidad Javier Hernández
- Comunidad Mattey
- Reparto Isidoro Colón
- Reparto Ramírez
- Sector Alto Cuba
- Sector Boquerón
- Sector Cuatro Calles
- Sector Cuchí 1 y 2
- Sector Green
- Sector Guayabota
- Sector Juego de Bola
- Sector Juncos
- Sector La Joya
- Sector La PRRA
- Sector López
- Sector Los Colones
- Sector Los Pitches
- Sector Mata de Plátano
- Sector Valle Colinas
- Sector Vira La Guagua
- Urbanización Campo Alegre I
- Urbanización Campo Alegre II
- Urbanización Campo Alegre
- Urbanización Jardines de Green
- Urbanización Remanso de Dominguito
- Urbanización Siverio
- Urbanización Villa Vélez

=== Esperanza ===
- Comunidad Juan A. Díaz Crespo
- Comunidad Richie Crespo
- Sector Arenita
- Sector Cienegueta
- Sector Hess
- Sector Hoyo Caña
- Sector La Paloma
- Sector Las Marías II
- Sector Las Marías
- Sector Patillo
- Sector San Rafael
- Sector Sonadora
- Sector Sonadora Chiquita

=== Factor ===
- Calle Los Méndez
- Calle Los Rivera
- Comunidad Ánimas
- Comunidad Factor I
- Hacienda El Paraíso
- Reparto Pastrana
- Sector 50 Cuerdas
- Sector Ánimas Sur
- Sector Ánimas
- Sector Cercadillo
- Sector El Palmar
- Sector Factor I
- Sector La PRRA
- Sector Las Arenas
- Sector Las Flores
- Sector Polilla
- Urbanización Campos
- Urbanización Estancias de Arecibo
- Urbanización Jardines Factor
- Urbanización Los Jardines
- Urbanización Paseos de la Reina
- Urbanización Paseos Reales
- Urbanización Puerta del Este
- Urbanización Vistamar Estate

=== Garrochales ===
- Comunidad San Luis
- Sector Bethania
- Sector Bosque Cambalache
- Sector El Alto
- Sector El Salao
- Sector Factor II
- Sector La PRRA
- Sector Noriega
- Sector Sabana
- Sector Salao
- Sector San Luis
- Urbanización Haciendas de Garrochales
- Urbanización Jardines de Bethania
- Urbanización Villas de Garrochales
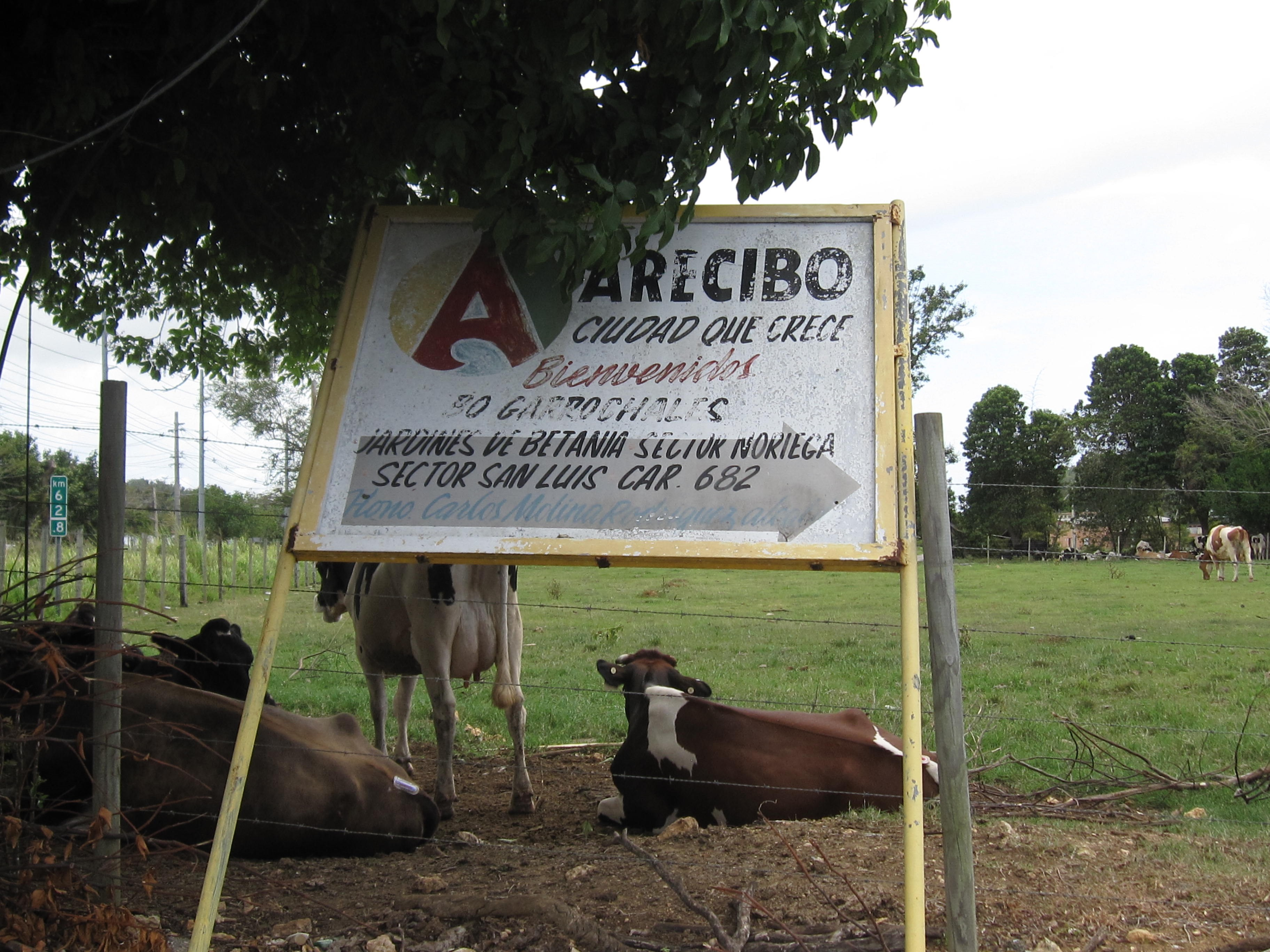
Cows at Sector Noriega, Jardines de Bethania and Sector San Luis

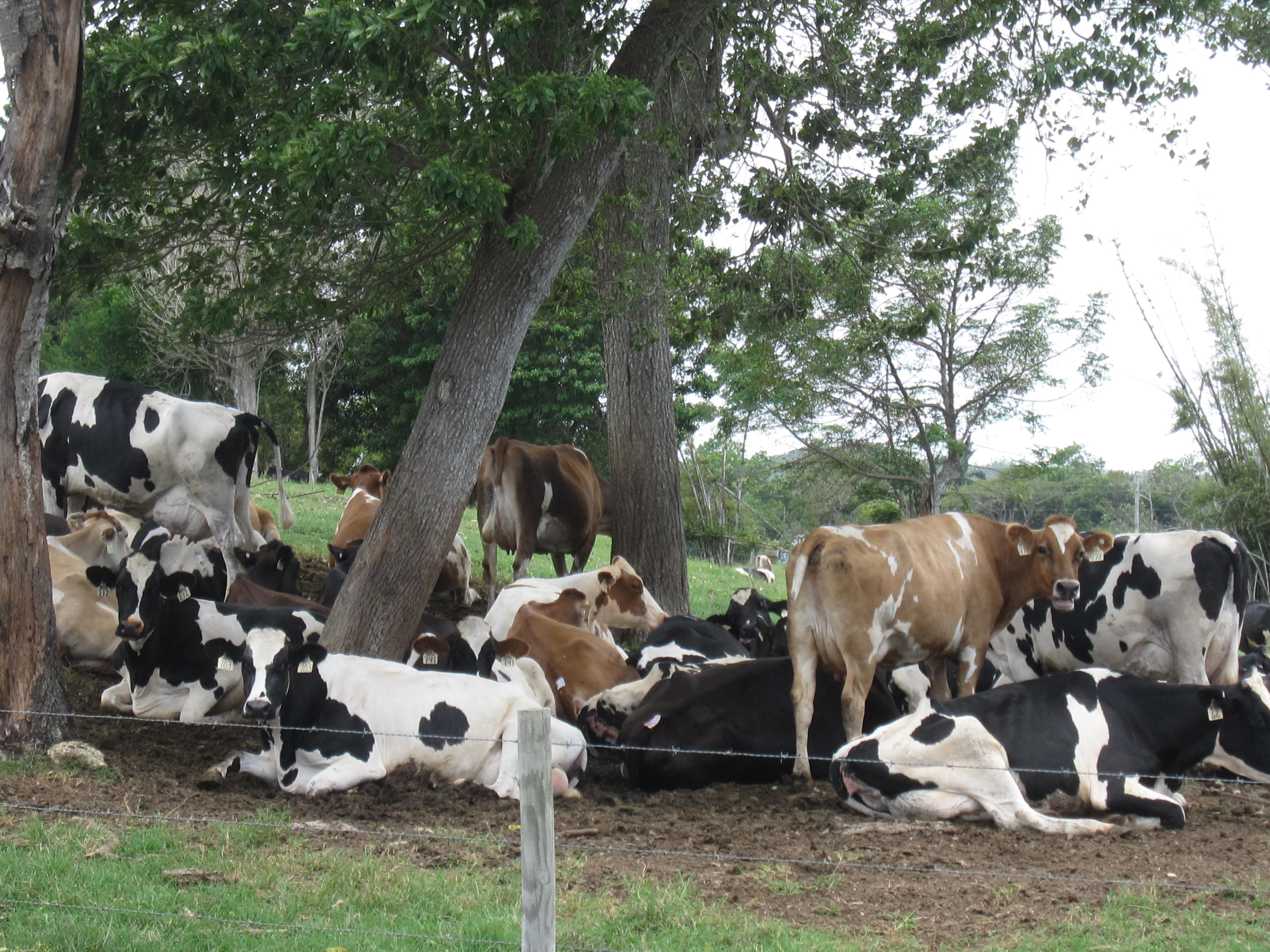
The milk industry of Arecibo on display near Sector Noriega, Jardines de Bethania and Sector San Luis

=== Hato Abajo ===
- Apartamentos Hermano Durán
- Apartamentos La Paz
- Avenida San Daniel
- Avenida San Luis
- Calle Anita Vázquez
- Callejon Los Ávila
- Camino Los García
- Comunidad Mora
- Comunidad Navas
- Comunidad Nuevas Hato Arriba
- Comunidad Víctor Rojas 1
- Comunidad Víctor Rojas 2
- Condominios Terrazul
- Égida Adolfo Martínez
- Jardines de Hato Arriba
- Monte Brisas
- Paseo La Esmeralda
- Paseo los Húcares
- Reparto Colina Verde
- Reparto Glorivee
- Reparto Luribet
- Reparto Pérez Abreu
- Reparto San Jorge
- Reparto San Miguel
- Residencial La Meseta
- Sector Barrancas
- Sector Combate
- Sector Cunetas
- Sector Denton
- Sector El Rosario
- Sector El Tamarindo
- Sector El Tanque
- Sector El Tres
- Sector Iglesia
- Sector Jayuya
- Sector Juncos
- Sector Korea
- Sector La Ceiba
- Sector Las Canelas
- Sector Los Delgado
- Sector Los Mora
- Sector Luis Delgado Hernández
- Sector San Daniel
- Sector Tamarindo
- Urbanización Reparto Edna
- Urbanización Alturas de San Daniel
- Urbanización Alturas del Atlántico
- Urbanización Alturas del Paraíso
- Urbanización Campo Real
- Urbanización Ciudad Atlantis
- Urbanización Colinas de Palmarito
- Urbanización Colinas de Villa Toledo
- Urbanización El Paraíso
- Urbanización Ermelinda Estate
- Urbanización Estancias del Norte
- Urbanización Estancias El Verde
- Urbanización Extensión Villa Los Santos II
- Urbanización Hacienda de Juncos
- Urbanización Hacienda del Mar
- Urbanización Hacienda Toledo
- Urbanización Jardines de Arecibo
- Urbanización Jardines de Juncos
- Urbanización Jardines de San Rafael
- Urbanización Las Brisas
- Urbanización Los Corozos
- Urbanización Parque de Jardines
- Urbanización Paseo del Prado
- Urbanización Paseo Los Robles
- Urbanización Valle Escondido
- Urbanización Villa Delgado
- Urbanización Villa Gloria
- Urbanización Villa Rubí
- Urbanización Villa Toledo
- Urbanización Villas de Altamira
- Urbanización Vista Azul
- Urbanización Vistas del Atlántico
- Urbanización Vista Hermosa
- Urbanización y Extensión Marisol
- Villa Iris
- Villa Los Ángeles
- Villa Rosa
- Villas del Remanso

=== Hato Arriba ===
- Parcelas Navas
- Sector Corea
- Sector Juncos
- Sector Las Cunetas
- Urbanización El Monte
- Urbanización Las Brisas
- Urbanización Paseo Los Ángeles
- Urbanización San Felipe

=== Hato Viejo ===
- Sector Arizona
- Sector Calichoza
- Sector Canta Gallo
- Sector Derrame
- Sector La Pica
- Sector Llanada
- Sector Los Sauces
- Sector San Pedro

=== Islote ===
- Callejón del Cristo (Callejón del Diablo)
- Callejón Francés Apartamentos Oceanía
- Comunidad Islote I y II
- Comunidad Jarealito
- Comunidad Vigía
- Condominios Atlántica
- Sector Boán
- Sector Caracoles
- Sector Cueva del Indio
- Sector El Callejón
- Sector La Vía
- Sector Melilla
- Sector Pasaje
- Sector Piquiña
- Sector Rincón Chiquito
- Sector Rincón Grande
- Sector Vívora
- Urbanización Brisas de Palma Roja
- Urbanización Brisas del Mar I y II
- Urbanización Corales del Mar
- Urbanización Costa de Oro
- Urbanización Costa del Atlántico
- Urbanización Costas del Mar
- Urbanización Reparto Maritza

=== Miraflores ===
- Sector Biáfara
- Sector Espino
- Sector Las Arenas
- Sector Villisla
- Urbanización Monte Escondido

=== Río Arriba ===
- Sector Central Hidroeléctrica
- Sector Cuerpo de Paz
- Sector Dos Bocas
- Sector El Valle
- Sector Jobo
- Sector La Canina I y II
- Sector Los Chorros
- Sector Vacupey

=== Sabana Hoyos ===
- Calle Las Brisas
- Comunidad Moreda
- Comunidad Nuevas Sabana Hoyos
- Hacienda San José
- Reparto Los Rosario
- Sector Aldea
- Sector Alianza
- Sector Allende
- Sector Asomante
- Sector Ballajá
- Sector Candelaria
- Sector Carolina
- Sector Comisión
- Sector Córdova
- Sector Fortuna
- Sector Hacienda Las Abras
- Sector Jovales
- Sector La Alianza
- Sector La Vega
- Sector Las Arenas
- Sector Las Correa
- Sector Loma Correa
- Sector Manantiales
- Sector Méndez
- Sector Montaña
- Sector Riachuelo
- Sector Román
- Sector Segunda Unidad
- Sector Villa Ferré
- Sector Walcott
- Urbanización Brisas de Manantiales
- Urbanización Estancias de la Sabana
- Urbanización Estancias Palma Real
- Urbanización Flamboyanes
- Urbanización Hacienda San Agustín
- Urbanización Jardines de Candelaria
- Urbanización Manantiales
- Urbanización Mansiones de Manantiales
- Urbanización Reparto Manantiales
- Urbanización Reparto Santa María
- Urbanización Reparto Vista Verde
- Urbanización Sabana Gardens
- Urbanización Sabana I
- Urbanización Villa Fortuna

=== Santana ===
- Apartamentos Paseos Reales
- Calle Gerónimo
- Calle Landrón
- Calle Los Rivera
- Comunidad Las Pérez
- Comunidad Los Llanos
- Condominios Arecibo Apartments
- Hermandad
- Sector Ánimas
- Sector Cercadillo
- Sector El Palmar
- Sector La Represa
- Sector Los Gallegos
- Sector Puerco Flaco
- Urbanización El Capitolio
- Urbanización Estancias Balseiro
- Urbanización Estancias del Molino
- Urbanización Los Pinos
- Urbanización Los Pinos 2
- Urbanización Paseos Reales
- Urbanización Sagrado Corazón
- Urbanización Tanamá
- Urbanización Villa Mena

=== Tanamá ===
- Comunidad Abra San Francisco
- Condominios Villa Campestre
- Sector Charco Hondo
- Sector Colloral
- Sector Curva de Bravo
- Sector El Dique
- Sector Higuillales
- Sector Juan Saúl
- Sector La Guinea
- Sector La Planta
- Sector Los Caños
- Sector Los Chinos
- Sector Marcos Soto
- Sector Ojo del Agua
- Sector Oriente
- Urbanización Camino del Valle
- Urbanización Estancias de la Riviera
- Urbanización Valle Verde
- Urbanización Villa Ángela

== See also ==
- List of communities in Puerto Rico
