= Sabana Hoyos, Arecibo, Puerto Rico =

Barrio of Puerto Rico

Sabana Hoyos
- Barrio
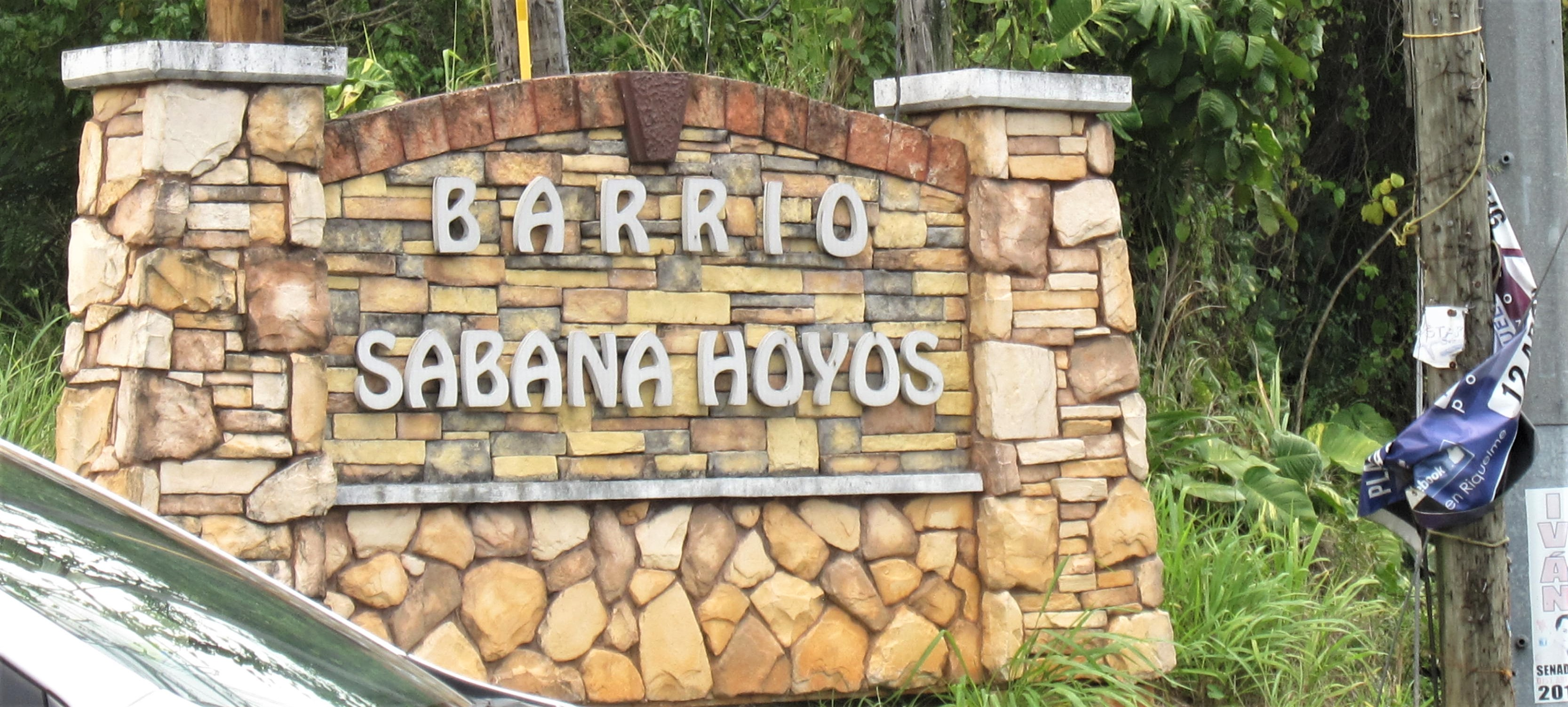
- Rock wall Sabana Hoyos sign

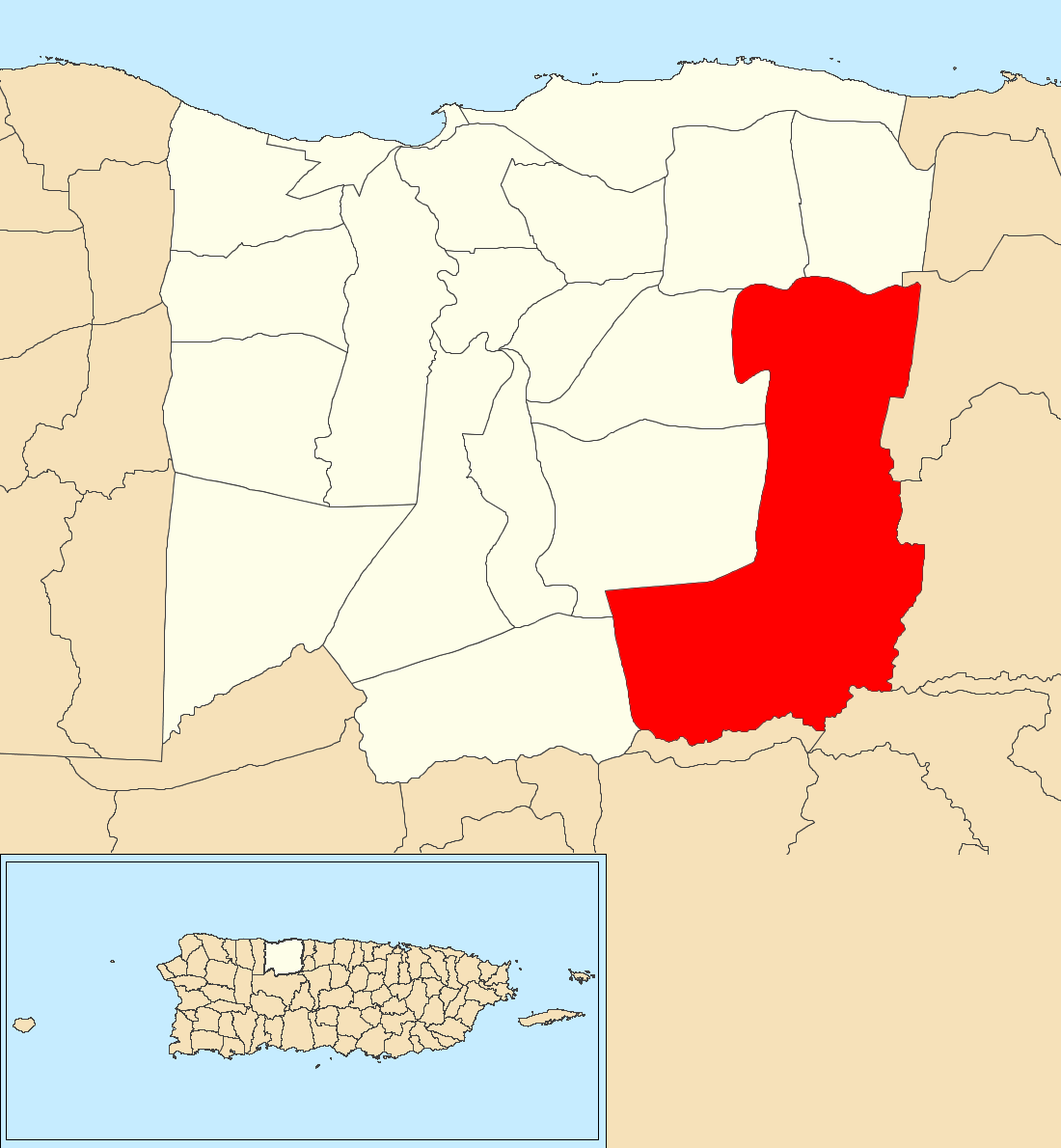
- Location of Sabana Hoyos within the municipality of Arecibo shown in red

- Location of Puerto Rico
- Coordinates: 18°22′37″N 66°36′43″W
- Commonwealth: Puerto Rico
- Municipality: Arecibo

Area
  - Total: 23.02 sq mi (59.6 km^{2})
  - Land: 23.00 sq mi (59.6 km^{2})
  - Water: 0.02 sq mi (0.052 km^{2})
- Elevation: 751 ft (229 m)

Population (2010)
  - Total: 10,745
  - Density: 467.2/sq mi (180.4/km^{2})
- Source: 2010 Census
- Time zone: UTC−4 (AST)

Sabana Hoyos is a barrio in the municipality of Arecibo, Puerto Rico. Its population in 2010 was 10,745.

Sabana Hoyos is the largest barrio of Puerto Rico.

== History ==
Sabana Hoyos was in Spain's gazetteers until Puerto Rico was ceded by Spain in the aftermath of the Spanish–American War under the terms of the Treaty of Paris of 1898 and became an unincorporated territory of the United States. In 1899, the United States Department of War conducted a census of Puerto Rico finding that the population of Sabana Hoyos barrio was 3,568.

Historical population
| Census | Pop. | Note | %± |
|---|---|---|---|
| 1900 | 3,568 | | — |
| 1910 | 3,669 | | 2.8% |
| 1920 | 4,572 | | 24.6% |
| 1930 | 4,753 | | 4.0% |
| 1940 | 5,274 | | 11.0% |
| 1950 | 5,344 | | 1.3% |
| 1960 | 5,665 | | 6.0% |
| 1970 | 5,949 | | 5.0% |
| 1980 | 7,570 | | 27.2% |
| 1990 | 9,440 | | 24.7% |
| 2000 | 11,064 | | 17.2% |
| 2010 | 10,745 | | −2.9% |
U.S. Decennial Census; 1899 (shown as 1900) 1910-1930; 1930-1950 1980-2000 2010

== Sectors ==
Barrios (which are, in contemporary times, roughly comparable to minor civil divisions) in turn are further subdivided into smaller local populated place areas/units called sectores (sectors in English). The types of sectores may vary, from normally sector to urbanización to reparto to barriada to residencial, among others.

The following sectors are in Sabana Hoyos barrio:

Calle Las Brisas, Comunidad Moreda, Comunidad Nuevas Sabana Hoyos, Hacienda San José, Reparto Los Rosario, Sector Aldea, Sector Alianza, Sector Allende, Sector Asomante, Sector Ballajá, Sector Candelaria, Sector Carolina, Sector Comisión, Sector Córdova, Sector Fortuna, Sector Hacienda Las Abras, Sector Jovales, Sector La Alianza, Sector La Vega, Sector Las Arenas, Sector Las Correa, Sector Loma Correa, Sector Manantiales, Sector Méndez, Sector Montaña, Sector Riachuelo, Sector Román, Sector Segunda Unidad, Sector Villa Ferré, Sector Walcott, Urbanización Brisas de Manantiales, Urbanización Estancias de la Sabana, Urbanización Estancias Palma Real, Urbanización Flamboyanes, Urbanización Hacienda San Agustín, Urbanización Jardines de Candelaria, Urbanización Manantiales, Urbanización Mansiones de Manantiales, Urbanización Reparto Manantiales, Urbanización Reparto Santa María, Urbanización Reparto Vista Verde, Urbanización Sabana Gardens, Urbanización Sabana I, and Urbanización Villa Fortuna.

== Gallery ==
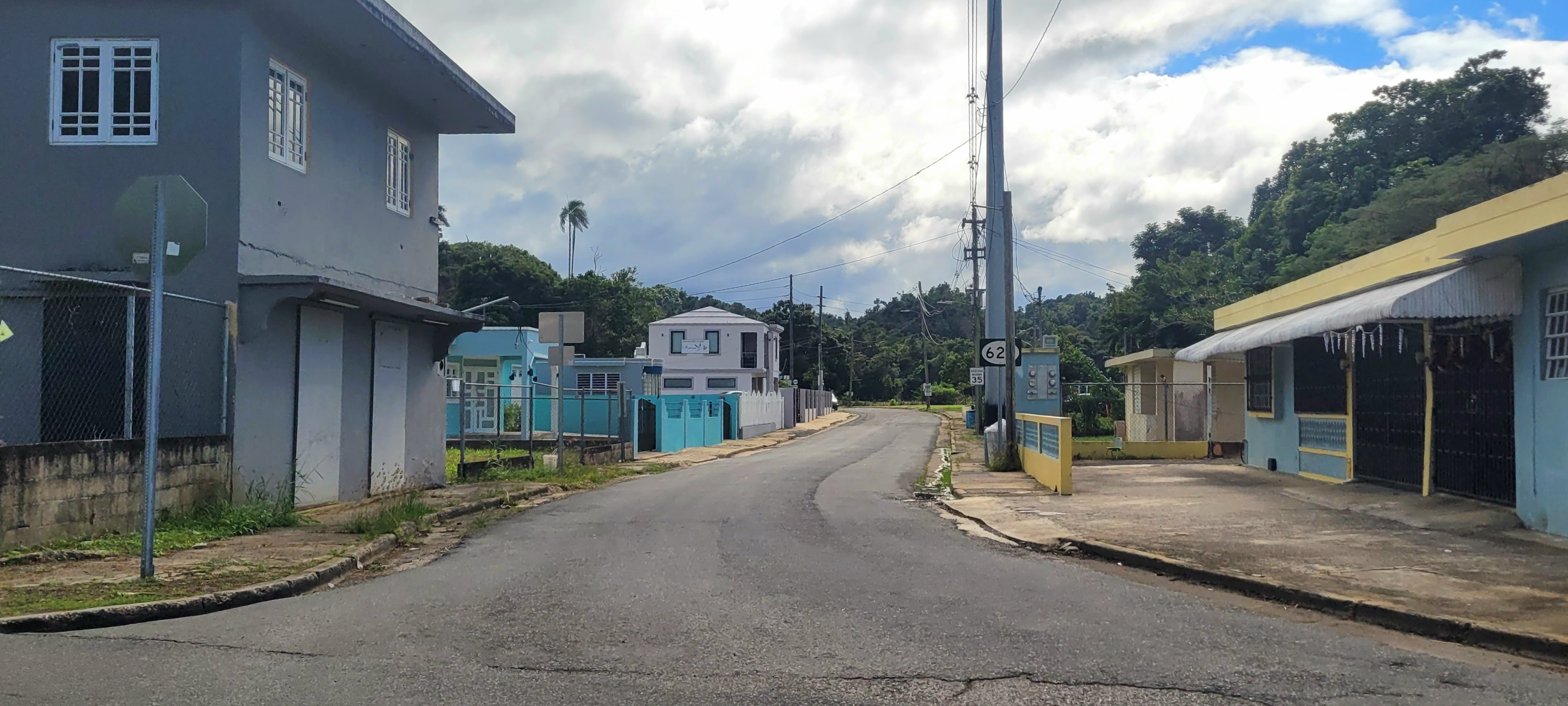
Puerto Rico Highway 628 in Sabana Hoyos

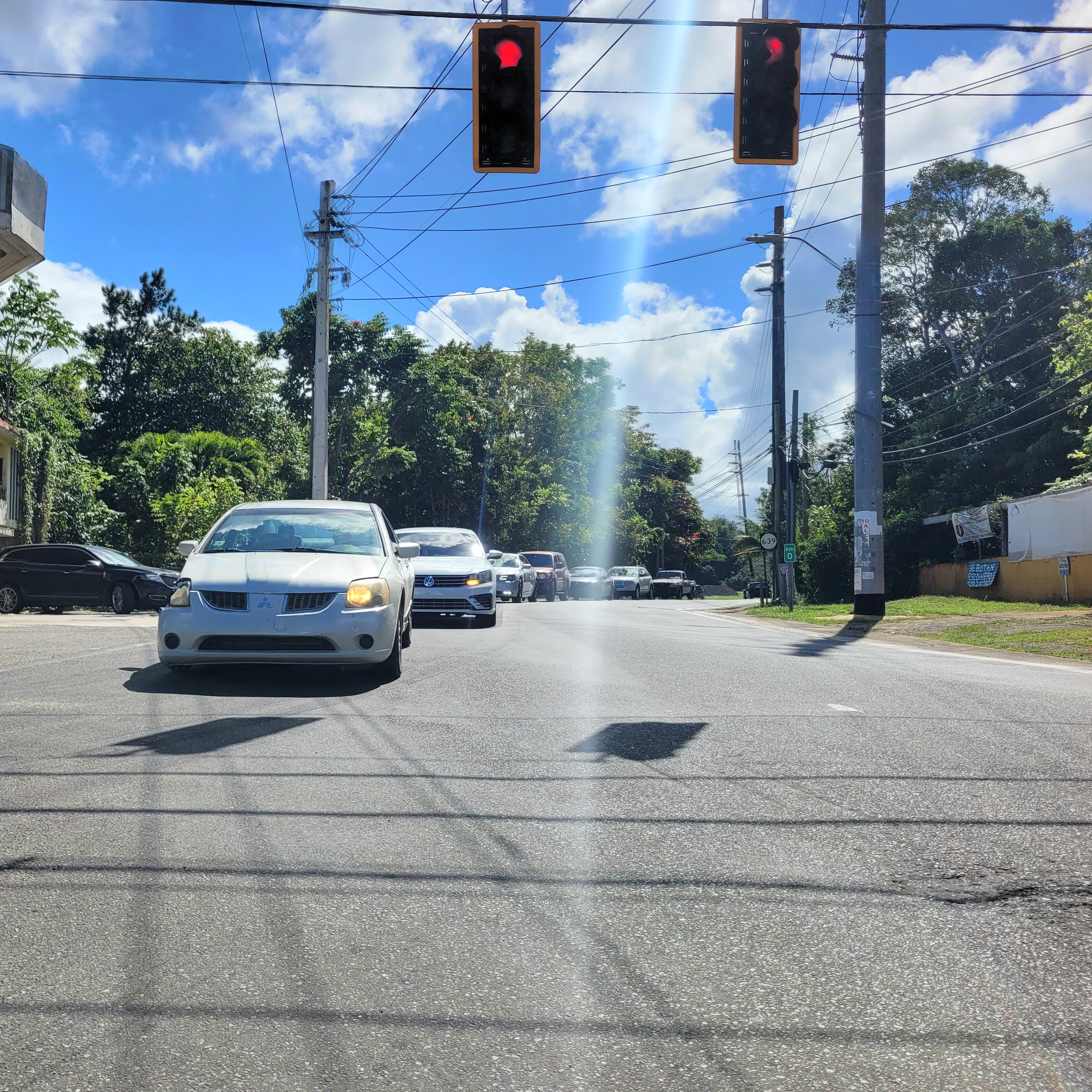
Puerto Rico Highway 639 in Sabana Hoyos

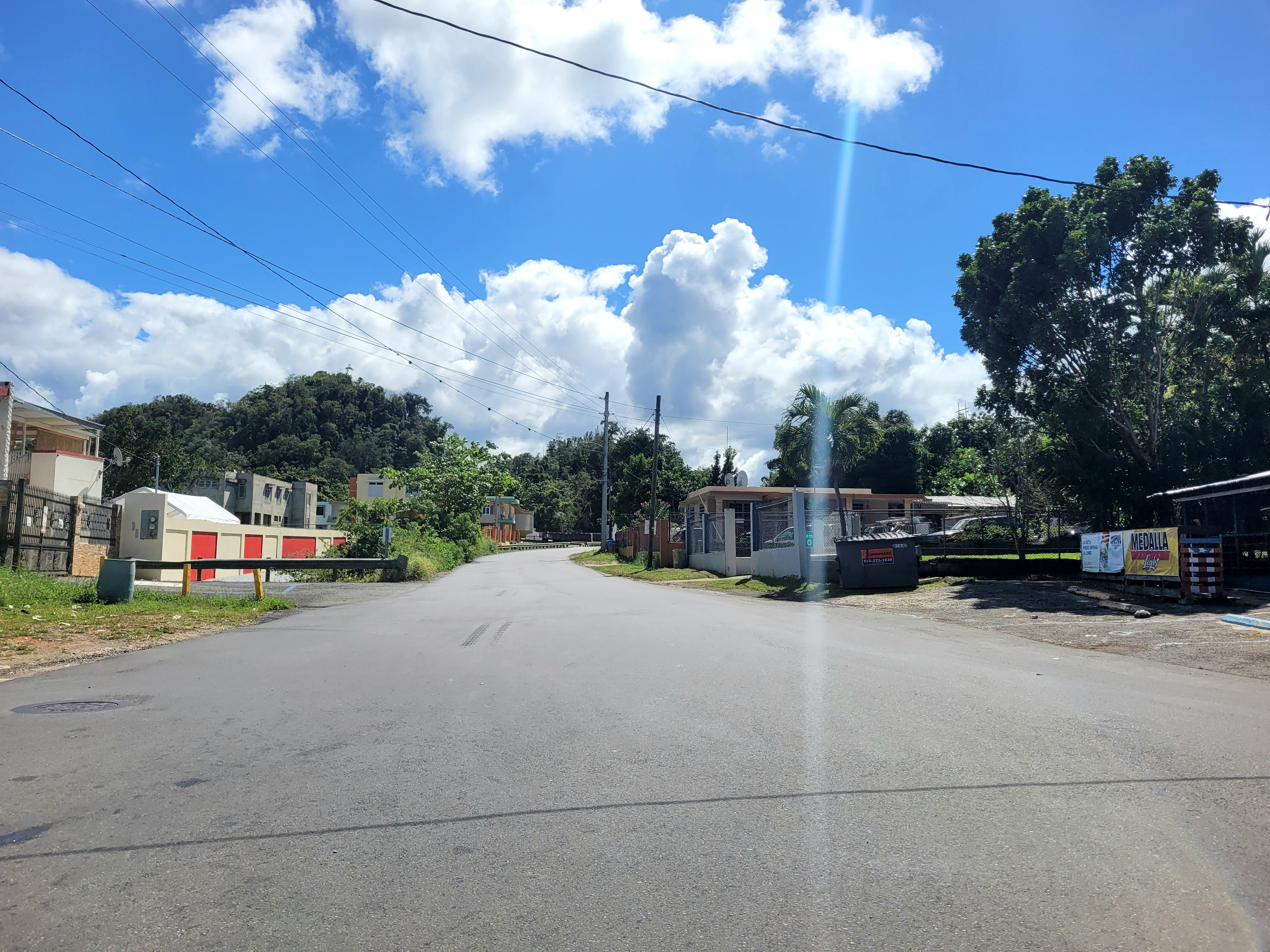
Puerto Rico Highway 663 in Sabana Hoyos

== See also ==
- List of communities in Puerto Rico
- List of barrios and sectors of Arecibo, Puerto Rico
