= Dominguito, Arecibo, Puerto Rico =

Barrio of Puerto Rico

Dominguito
- Barrio
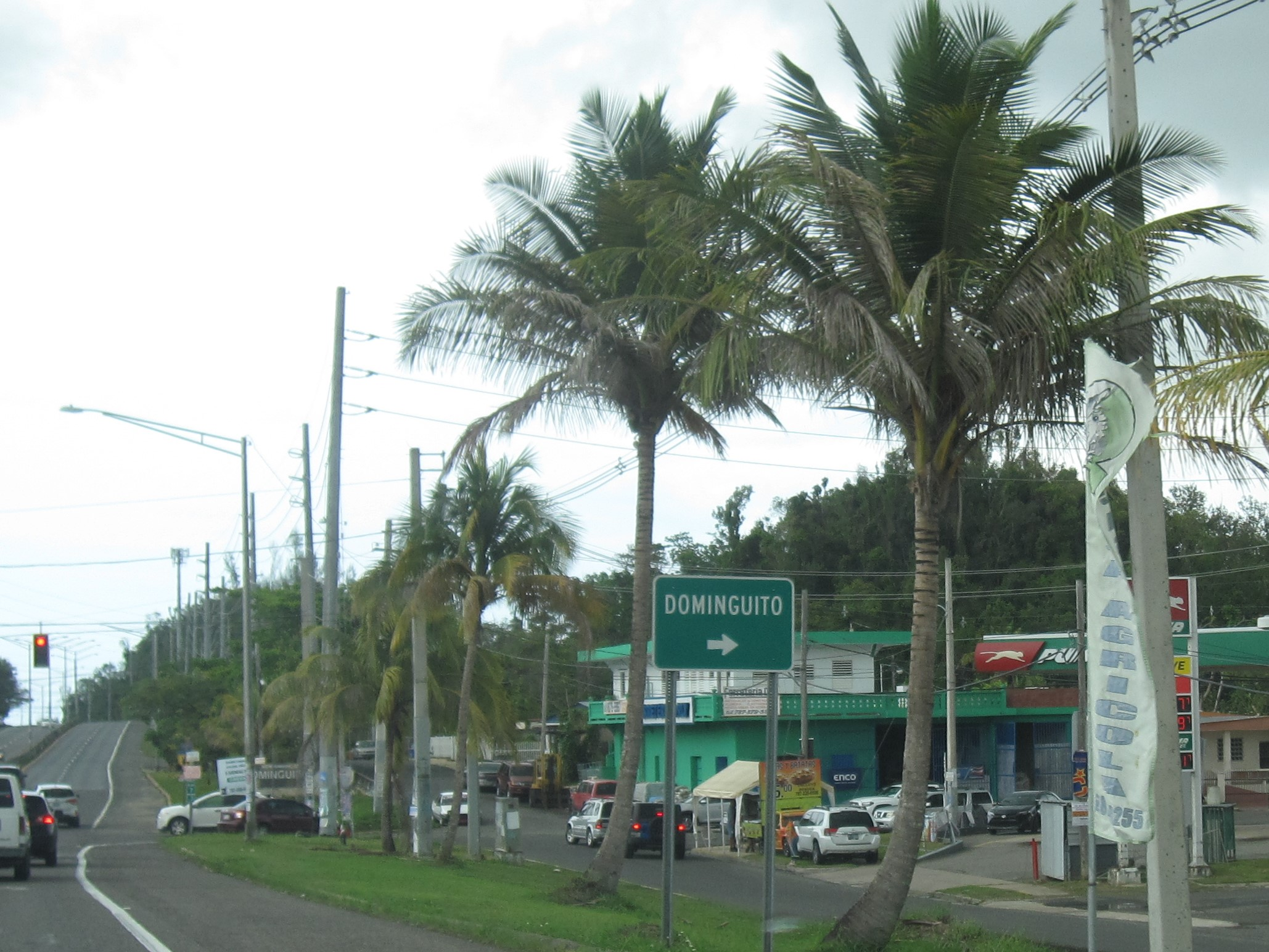
- Sign for Dominguito from PR-129

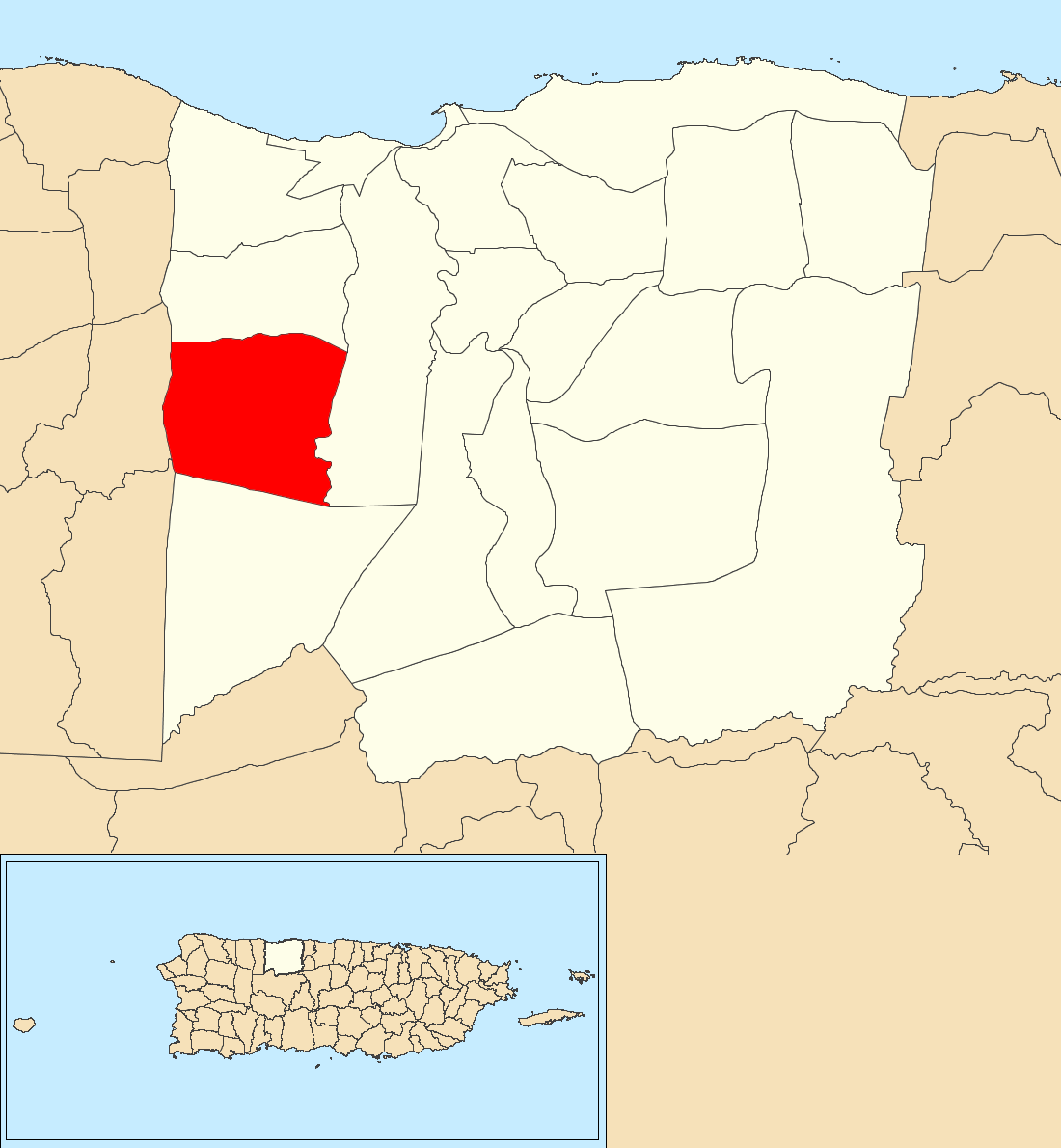
- Location of Dominguito within the municipality of Arecibo shown in red

- Location of Puerto Rico
- Coordinates: 18°24′06″N 66°44′34″W
- Commonwealth: Puerto Rico
- Municipality: Arecibo

Area
  - Total: 6.72 sq mi (17.4 km^{2})
  - Land: 6.71 sq mi (17.4 km^{2})
  - Water: 0.01 sq mi (0.026 km^{2})
- Elevation: 518 ft (158 m)

Population (2010)
  - Total: 4,895
  - Density: 729.5/sq mi (281.7/km^{2})
- Source: 2010 Census
- Time zone: UTC−4 (AST)

Dominguito is a barrio in the municipality of Arecibo, Puerto Rico. Its population in 2010 was 4,895.

== History ==
Dominguito was in Spain's gazetteers until Puerto Rico was ceded by Spain in the aftermath of the Spanish–American War under the terms of the Treaty of Paris of 1898 and became an unincorporated territory of the United States. In 1899, the United States Department of War conducted a census of Puerto Rico finding that the population of Dominguito barrio was 1,093.

Historical population
Census	Pop.	Note	%±
1900	1,093		—
1910	1,489		36.2%
1920	2,071		39.1%
1930	2,959		42.9%
1940	2,671		−9.7%
1950	3,019		13.0%
1960	3,039		0.7%
1970	3,258		7.2%
1980	3,831		17.6%
1990	4,499		17.4%
2000	4,998		11.1%
2010	4,895		−2.1%
U.S. Decennial Census; 1899 (shown as 1900) 1910-1930; 1930-1950 1980-2000 2010

== Sectors ==
Barrios (which are, in contemporary times, roughly comparable to minor civil divisions) in turn are further subdivided into smaller local populated place areas/units called sectores (sectors in English). The types of sectores may vary, from normally sector to urbanización to reparto to barriada to residencial, among others.

The following sectors are in Dominguito barrio:

Calle Estremera Camino Estemera Comunidad Javier Hernández Comunidad Mattey Reparto Isidoro Colón Reparto Ramírez Sector Alto Cuba Sector Boquerón Sector Cuatro Calles Sector Cuchí 1 y 2 Sector Green Sector Guayabota Sector Juego de Bola Sector Juncos Sector La Joya Sector La PRRA Sector López Sector Los Colones Sector Los Piches Sector Mata de Plátano Sector Valle Colinas Sector Vira La Guagua Urbanización Campo Alegre I Urbanización Campo Alegre II Urbanización Campo Alegre Urbanización Jardines de Green Urbanización Remanso de Dominguito Urbanización Siverio, and Urbanización Villa Vélez.

== Gallery ==
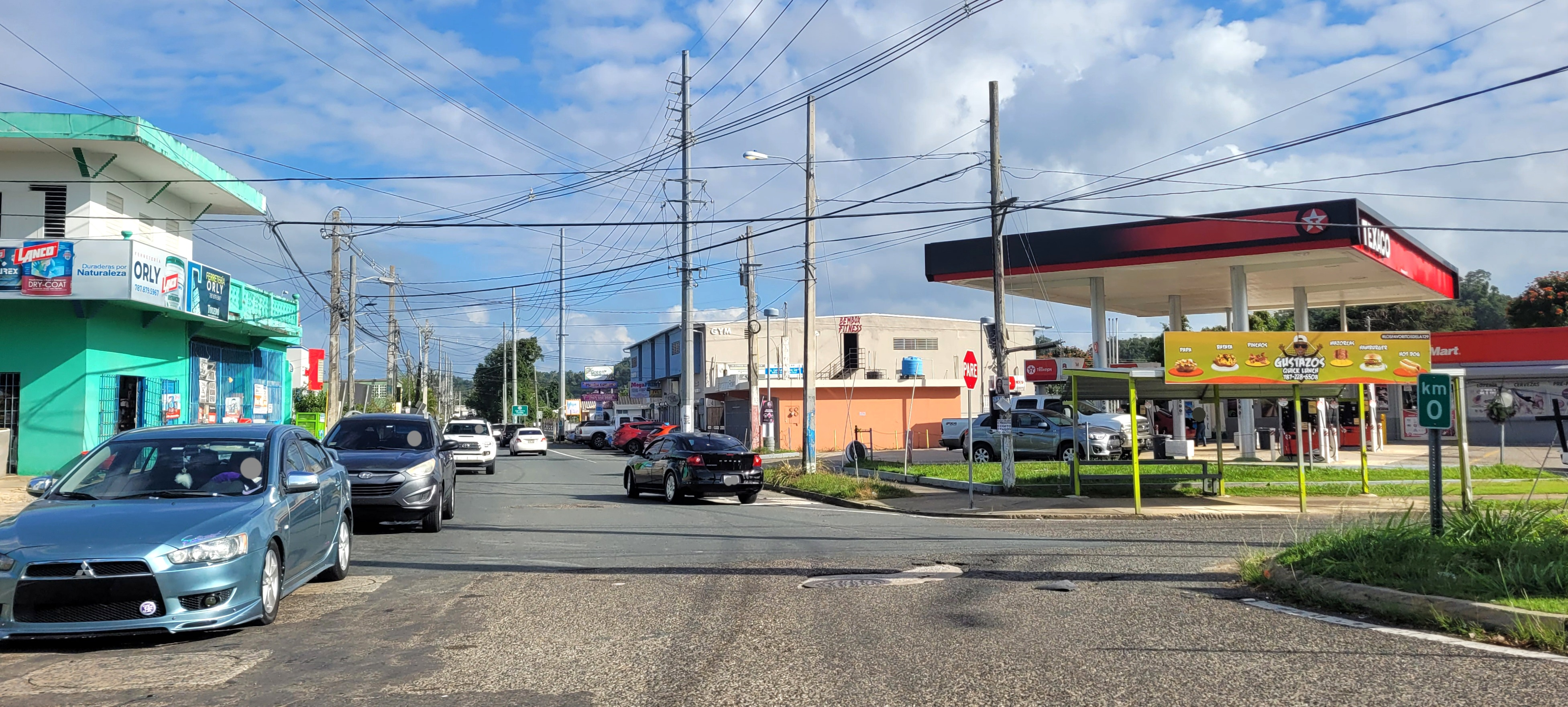
Puerto Rico Highway 635 between Campo Alegre (Hatillo) and Dominguito (Arecibo)

== See also ==
- List of communities in Puerto Rico
- List of barrios and sectors of Arecibo, Puerto Rico
