= Domingo Ruíz, Arecibo, Puerto Rico =

Barrio of Puerto Rico

Domingo Ruíz
- Barrio
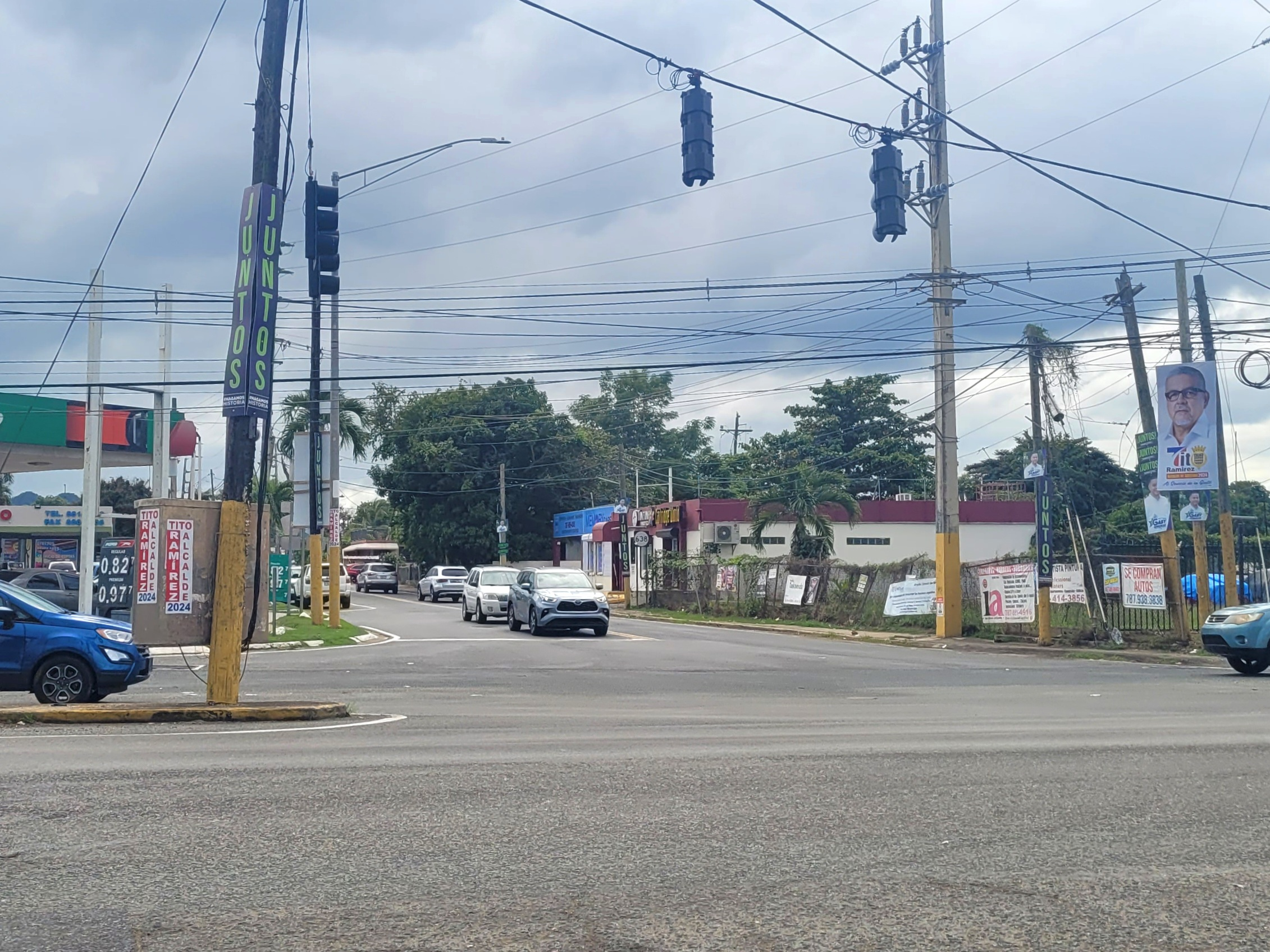
- Puerto Rico Highway 638 between Cambalache and Domingo Ruíz

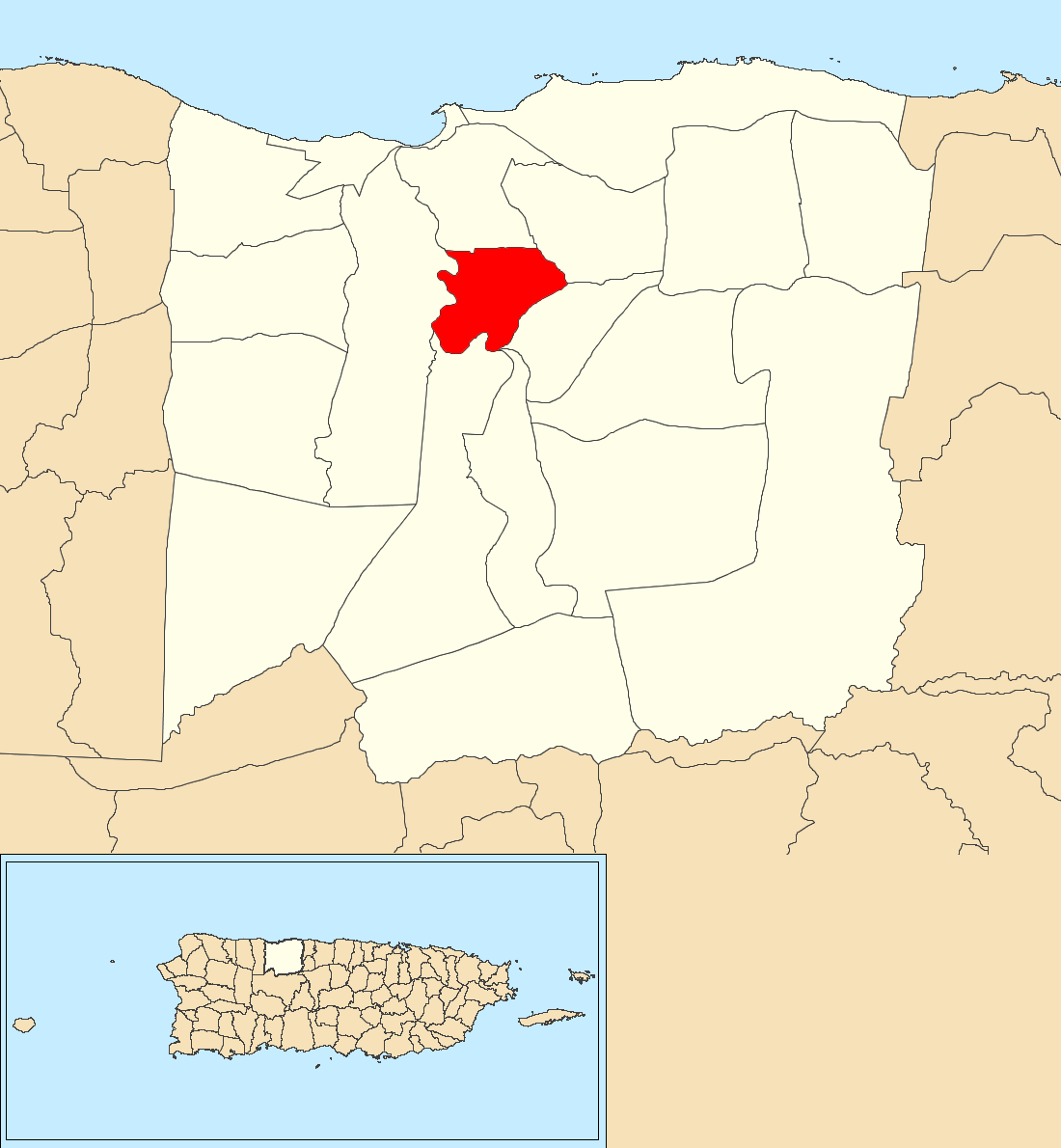
- Location of Domingo Ruíz within the municipality of Arecibo shown in red

- Location of Puerto Rico
- Coordinates: 18°26′10″N 66°41′12″W
- Commonwealth: Puerto Rico
- Municipality: Arecibo

Area
  - Total: 2.49 sq mi (6.4 km^{2})
  - Land: 2.47 sq mi (6.4 km^{2})
  - Water: 0.02 sq mi (0.052 km^{2})
- Elevation: 23 ft (7.0 m)

Population (2010)
  - Total: 3,153
  - Density: 1,276.5/sq mi (492.9/km^{2})
- Source: 2010 Census
- Time zone: UTC−4 (AST)

Domingo Ruíz is a barrio in the municipality of Arecibo, Puerto Rico. Its population in 2010 was 3,153.

== History ==
Domingo Ruíz was in Spain's gazetteers until Puerto Rico was ceded by Spain in the aftermath of the Spanish–American War under the terms of the Treaty of Paris of 1898 and became an unincorporated territory of the United States. In 1899, the United States Department of War conducted a census of Puerto Rico finding that the population of Domingo Ruíz barrio was 931.

Historical population
Census	Pop.	Note	%±
1900	931		—
1910	1,017		9.2%
1920	889		−12.6%
1930	1,053		18.4%
1940	1,196		13.6%
1950	2,387		99.6%
1960	2,113		−11.5%
1970	2,427		14.9%
1980	3,302		36.1%
1990	3,550		7.5%
2000	3,444		−3.0%
2010	3,153		−8.4%
U.S. Decennial Census; 1899 (shown as 1900) 1910-1930; 1930-1950 1980-2000 2010

== Sectors ==
Barrios (which are, in contemporary times, roughly comparable to minor civil divisions) in turn are further subdivided into smaller local populated place areas/units called sectores (sectors in English). The types of sectores may vary, from normally sector to urbanización to reparto to barriada to residencial, among others.

The following sectors are in Domingo Ruíz barrio:

Calle Los Olmos, Calle Severo Ocasio, Comunidad Buena Vista, Comunidad Pueblo Nuevo, Comunidad Villa Kennedy, Sector Bajadero, Sector Cuesta Manatí, Sector El Maga, and Siverio Apartments.

== See also ==
- List of communities in Puerto Rico
- List of barrios and sectors of Arecibo, Puerto Rico
