= Carreras, Arecibo, Puerto Rico =

Barrio of Puerto Rico

Carreras
- Barrio
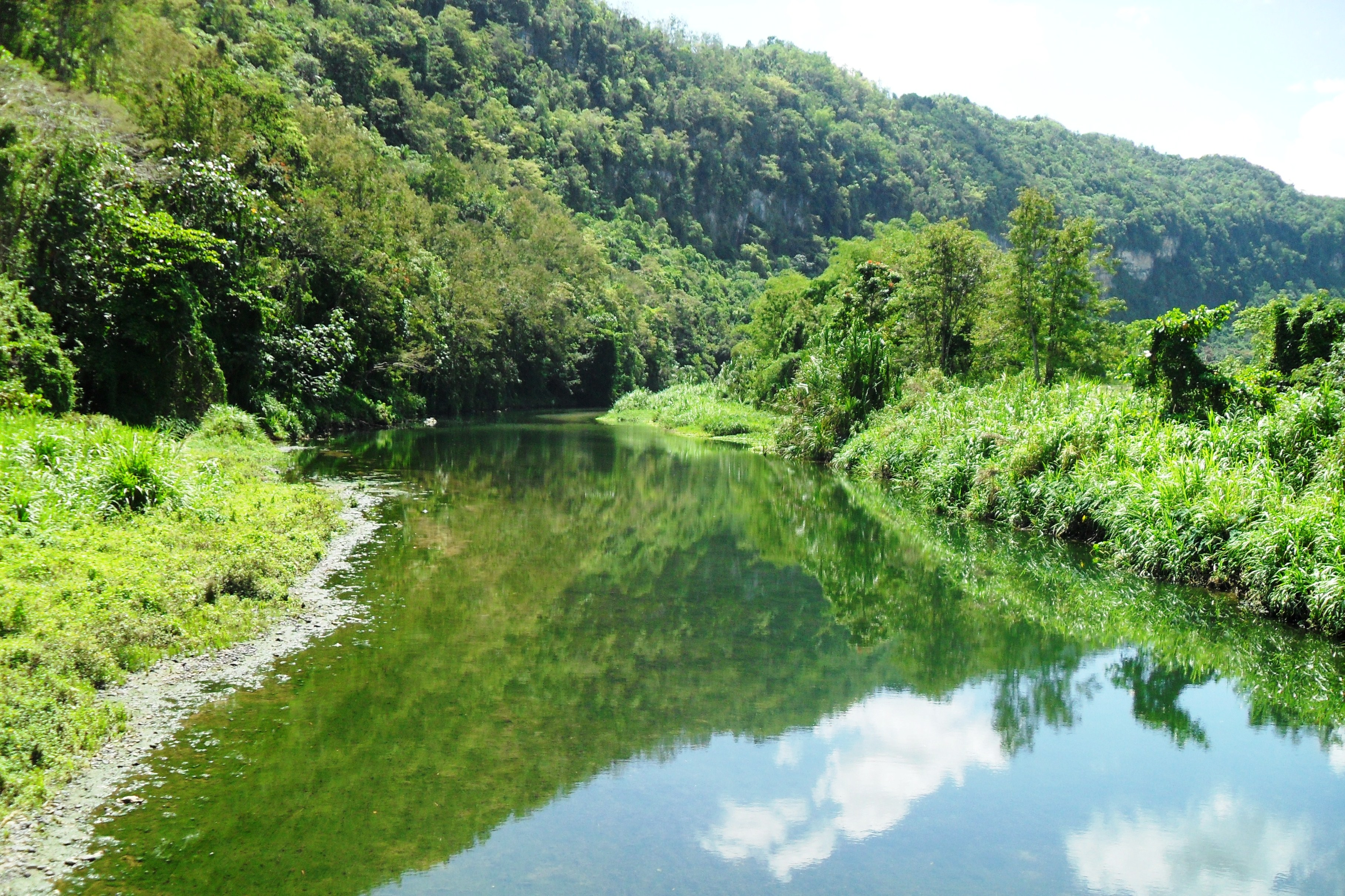
- Río Grande de Arecibo in Carreras

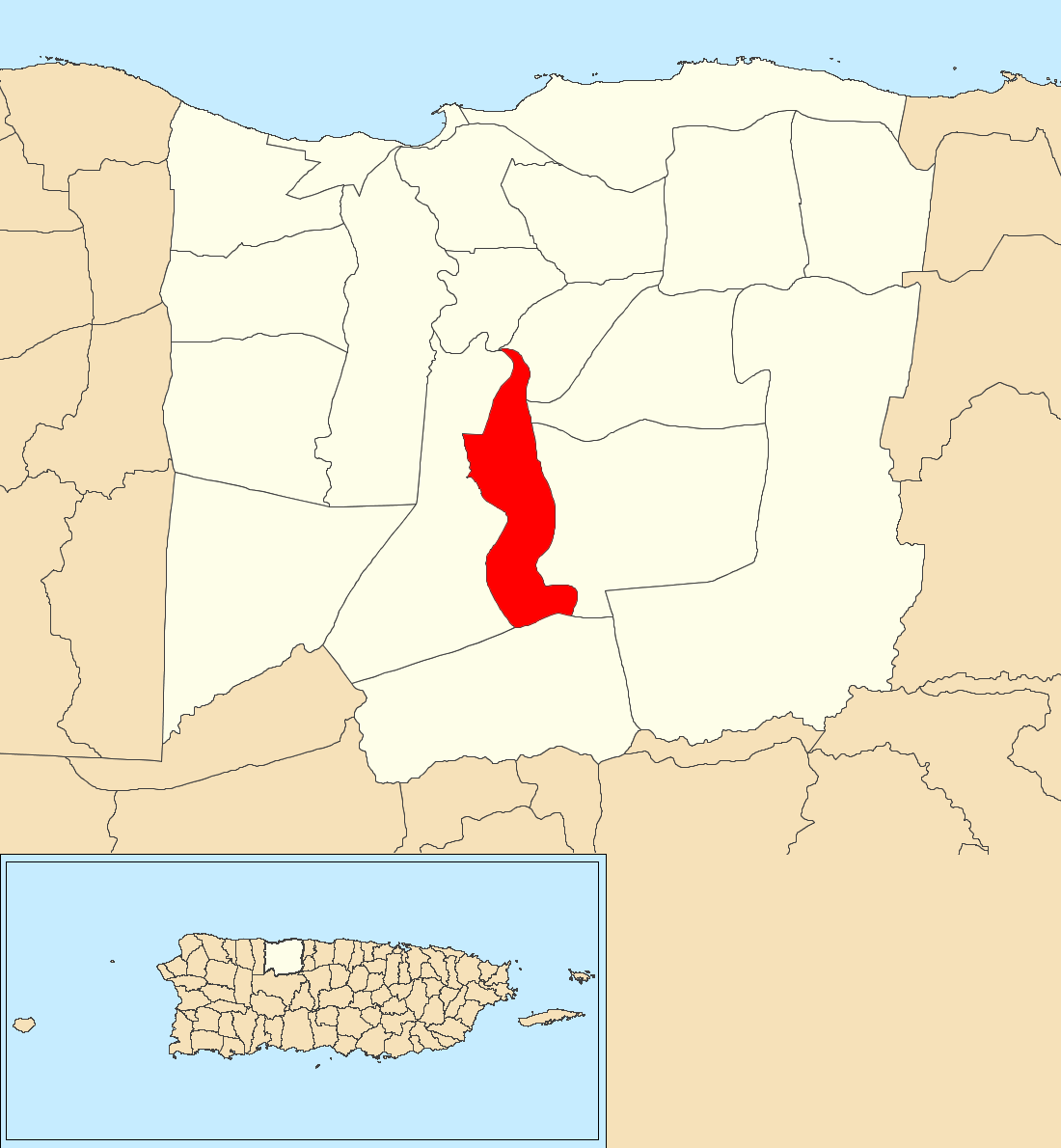
- Location of Carreras within the municipality of Arecibo shown in red

- Location of Puerto Rico
- Coordinates: 18°23′06″N 66°40′47″W
- Commonwealth: Puerto Rico
- Municipality: Arecibo

Area
  - Total: 3.91 sq mi (10.1 km^{2})
  - Land: 3.77 sq mi (9.8 km^{2})
  - Water: 0.14 sq mi (0.36 km^{2})
- Elevation: 75 ft (23 m)

Population (2010)
  - Total: 1,226
  - Density: 325.2/sq mi (125.6/km^{2})
- Source: 2010 Census
- Time zone: UTC−4 (AST)

Carreras is a barrio in the municipality of Arecibo, Puerto Rico. Its population in 2010 was 1,226.

== History ==
Carreras was in Spain's gazetteers until Puerto Rico was ceded by Spain in the aftermath of the Spanish–American War under the terms of the Treaty of Paris of 1898 and became an unincorporated territory of the United States. In 1899, the United States Department of War conducted a census of Puerto Rico finding that the population of Carreras barrio was 676.

Historical population
Census	Pop.	Note	%±
1900	676		—
1910	673		−0.4%
1920	883		31.2%
1930	1,101		24.7%
1940	1,237		12.4%
1950	1,523		23.1%
1960	1,329		−12.7%
1970	1,155		−13.1%
1980	1,360		17.7%
1990	1,218		−10.4%
2000	1,294		6.2%
2010	1,226		−5.3%
U.S. Decennial Census; 1899 (shown as 1900) 1910-1930; 1930-1950 1980-2000 2010

== Sectors ==
Barrios (which are, in contemporary times, roughly comparable to minor civil divisions) in turn are further subdivided into smaller local populated place areas/units called sectores (sectors in English). The types of sectores may vary, from normally sector to urbanización to reparto to barriada to residencial, among others.

The following sectors are in Carreras barrio:

Sector Carreras I, Sector Carreras II, Sector Cuesta Biáfara, Sector Jagual, and Sector Jurutungo.

== Gallery ==
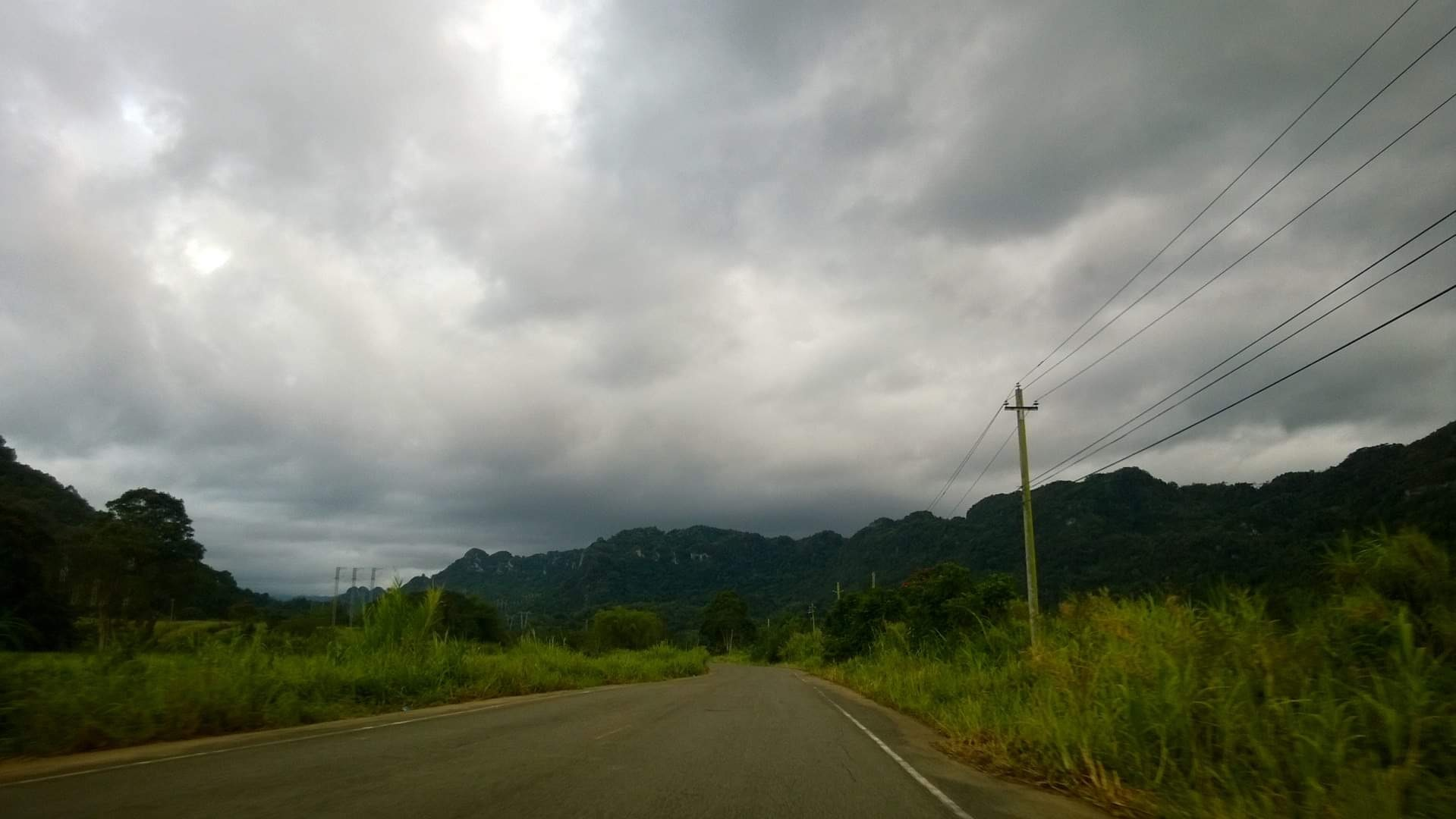
Puerto Rico Highway 123 in Carreras

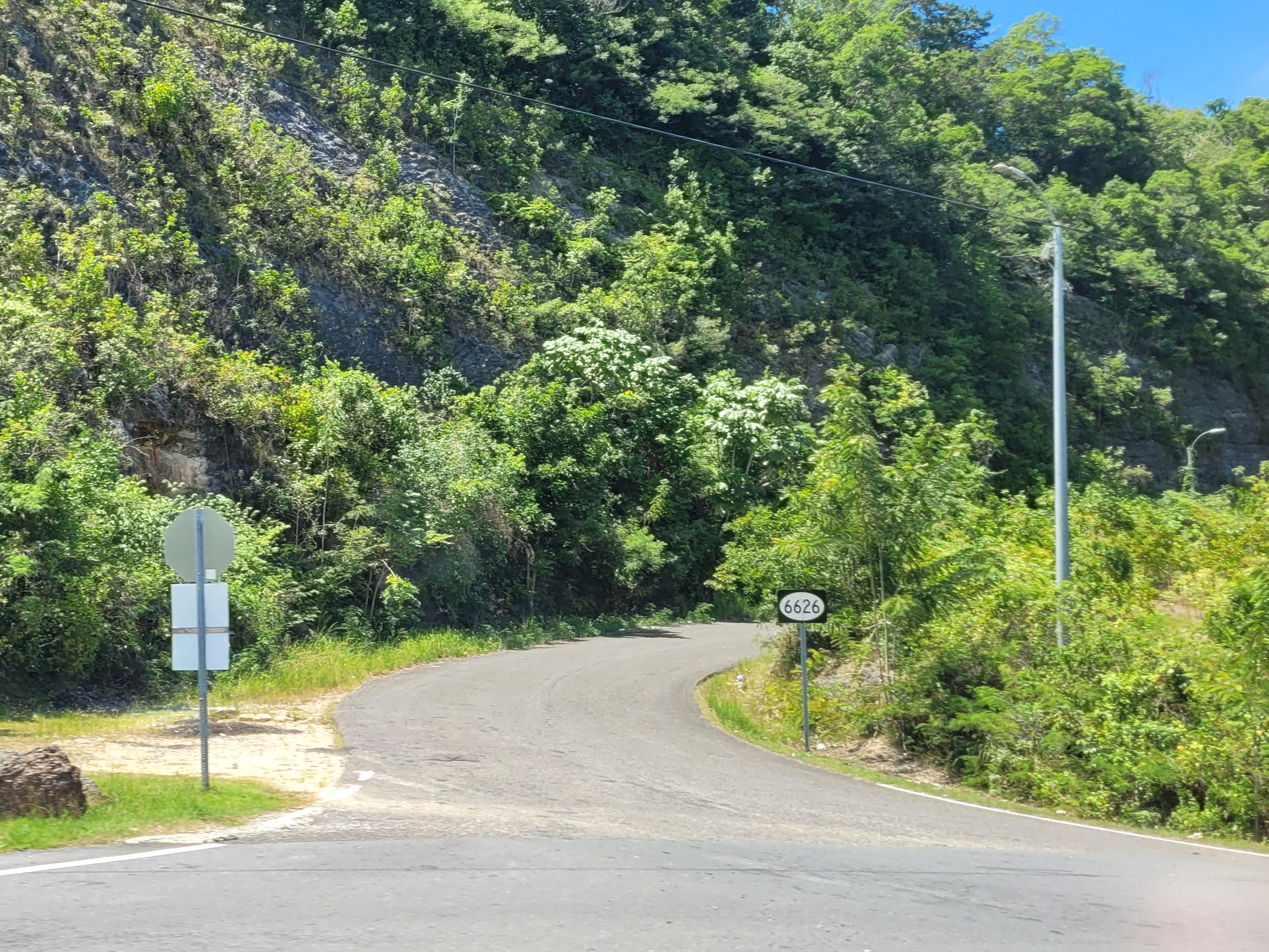
Puerto Rico Highway 6626 in Carreras

== See also ==
- List of communities in Puerto Rico
- List of barrios and sectors of Arecibo, Puerto Rico
