= Cambalache, Arecibo, Puerto Rico =

Barrio of Puerto Rico

Cambalache
- Barrio
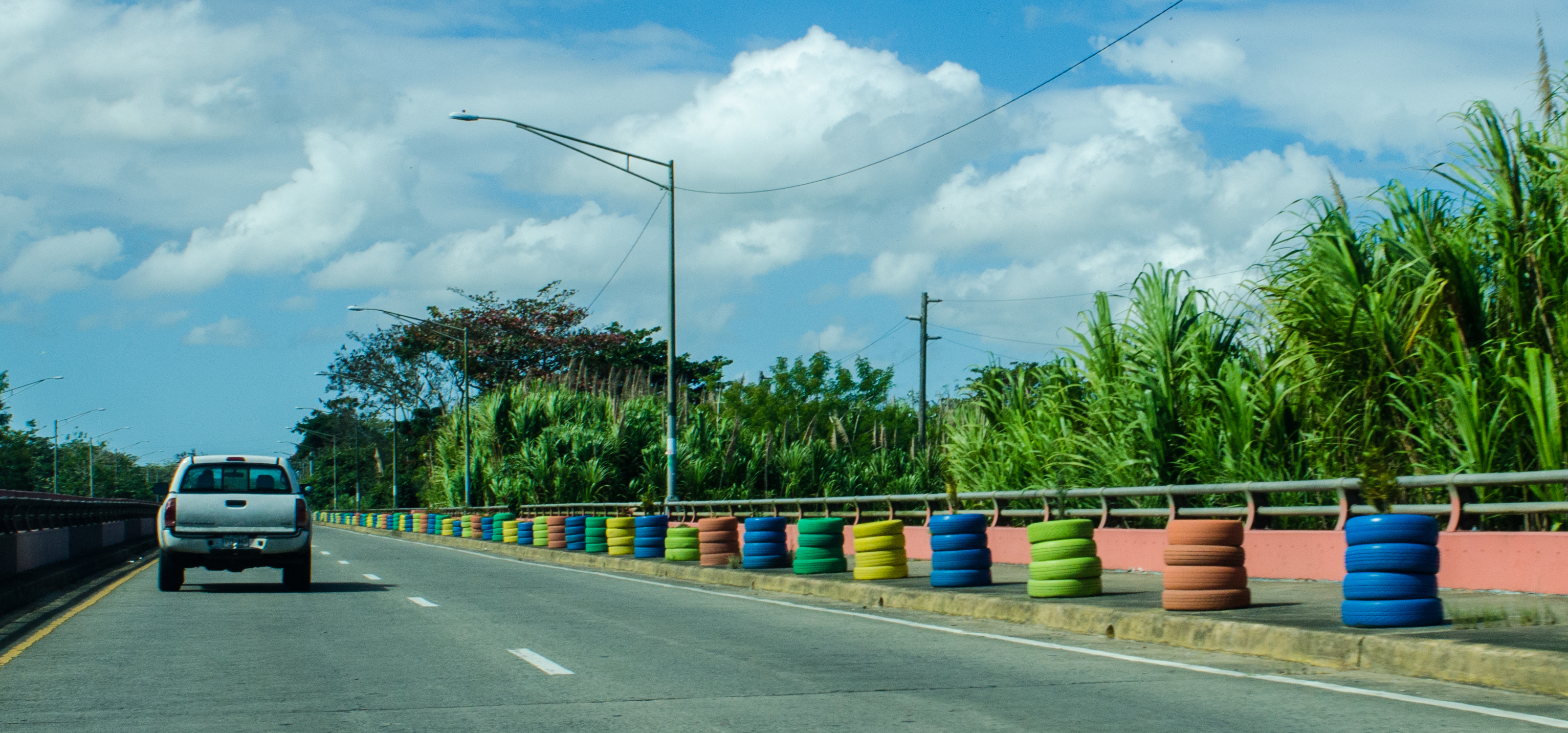
- Highway in Cambalache

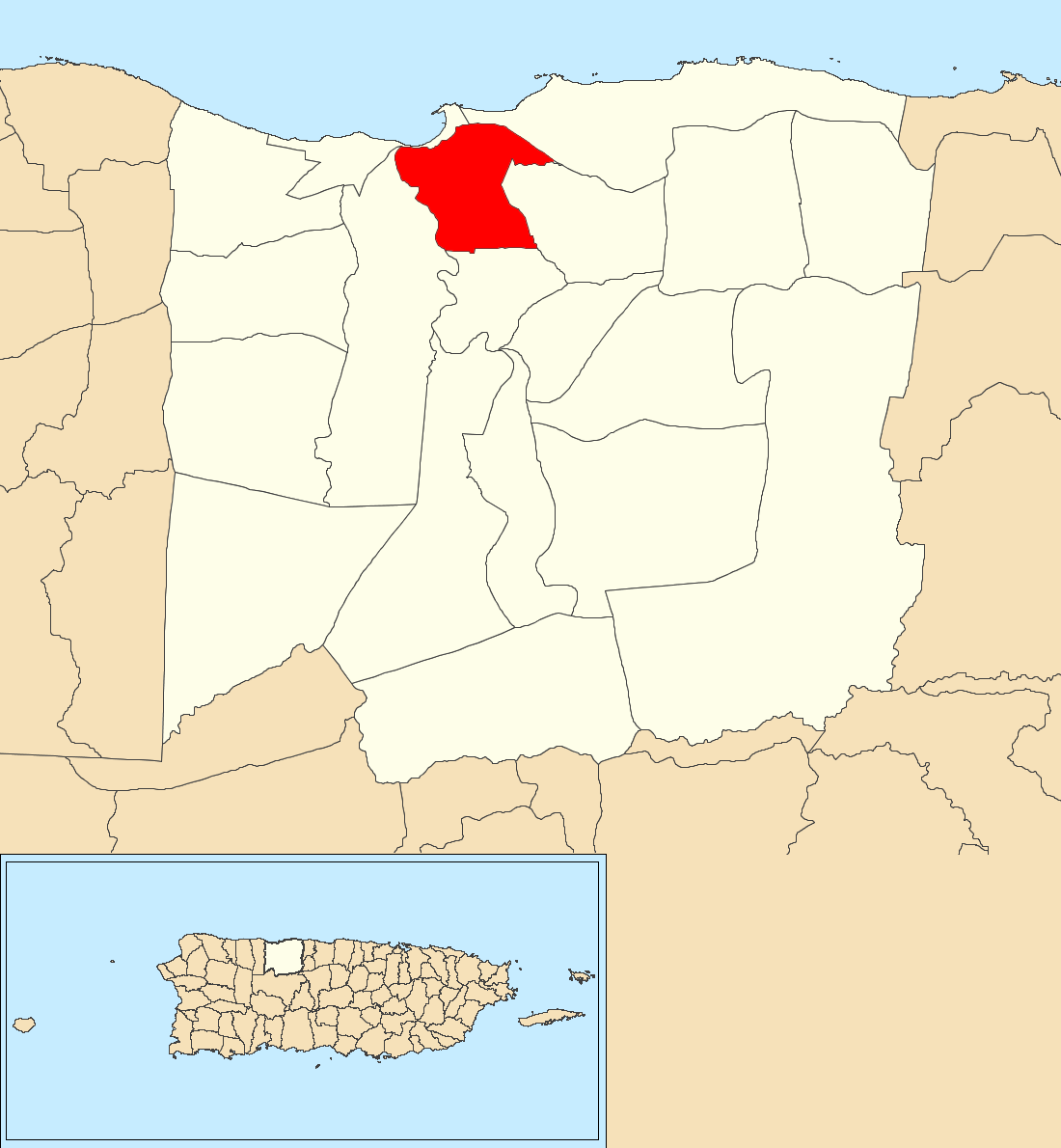
- Location of Cambalache within the municipality of Arecibo shown in red

- Location of Puerto Rico
- Coordinates: 18°27′43″N 66°41′31″W
- Commonwealth: Puerto Rico
- Municipality: Arecibo

Area
  - Total: 3.32 sq mi (8.6 km^{2})
  - Land: 3.23 sq mi (8.4 km^{2})
  - Water: 0.09 sq mi (0.23 km^{2})
- Elevation: 10 ft (3.0 m)

Population (2010)
  - Total: 40
  - Density: 12.4/sq mi (4.8/km^{2})
- Source: 2010 Census
- Time zone: UTC−4 (AST)

Cambalache is a barrio in the municipality of Arecibo, Puerto Rico. Its population in 2010 was 40.

== History ==
Cambalache was in Spain's gazetteers until Puerto Rico was ceded by Spain in the aftermath of the Spanish–American War under the terms of the Treaty of Paris of 1898 and became an unincorporated territory of the United States. In 1899, the United States Department of War conducted a census of Puerto Rico finding that the population of Cambalache barrio was 470.

Historical population
Census	Pop.	Note	%±
1900	470		—
1910	715		52.1%
1920	935		30.8%
1930	1,484		58.7%
1940	2,164		45.8%
1950	332		−84.7%
1960	156		−53.0%
1970	0		−100.0%
1980	74		—
1990	29		−60.8%
2000	64		120.7%
2010	40		−37.5%
U.S. Decennial Census; 1899 (shown as 1900) 1910-1930; 1930-1950 1980-2000 2010

In 2000, Cambalache reported the highest per capita income ($28,726) in Arecibo.

== Sectors ==
Barrios (which are, in contemporary times, roughly comparable to minor civil divisions) in turn are further subdivided into smaller local populated place areas/units called sectores (sectors in English). The types of sectores may vary, from normally sector to urbanización to reparto to barriada to residencial, among others.

The following sectors are in Cambalache barrio:

Callejón Cancela, Comunidad Domingo Ruiz, Finca Las Claras, Sector Santa Bárbara, and Urbanización Brisas del Valle.

== Waste-to-energy plant ==
Feasibility studies for building a waste-to-energy plant in Cambalache have been ongoing since before 2015.

== Gallery ==
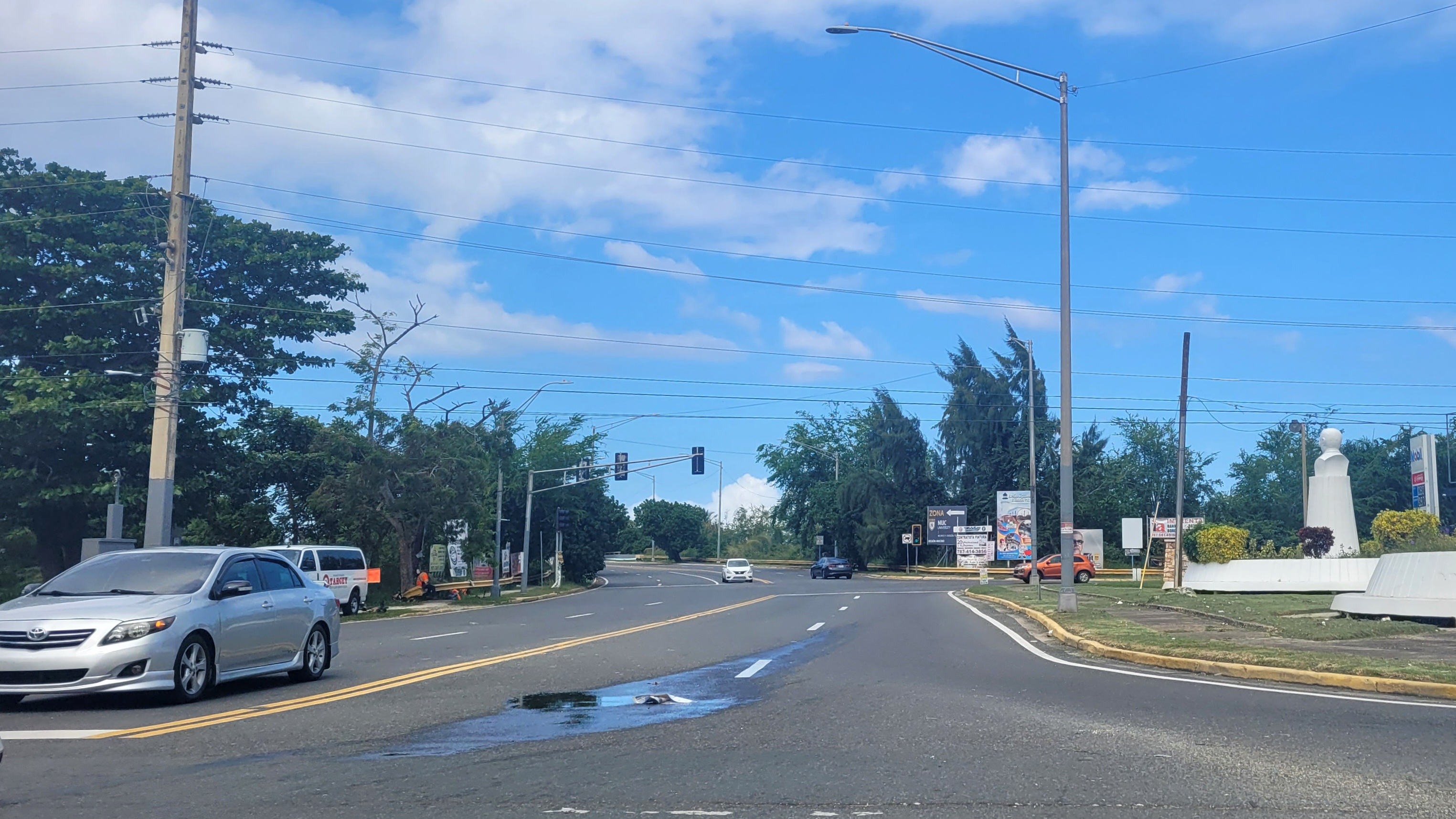
Puerto Rico Highway 680 in Cambalache

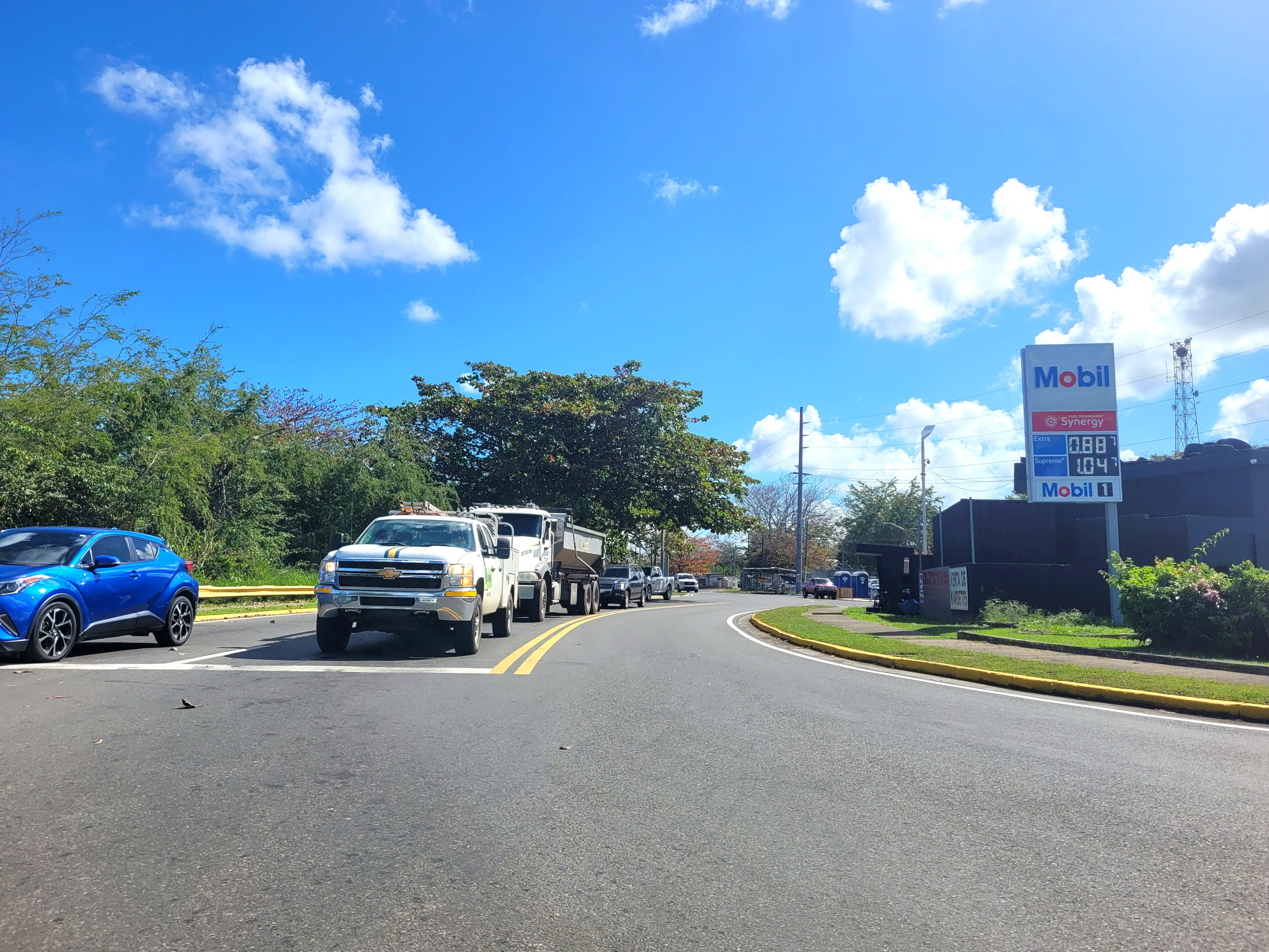
Puerto Rico Highway 681 in Cambalache

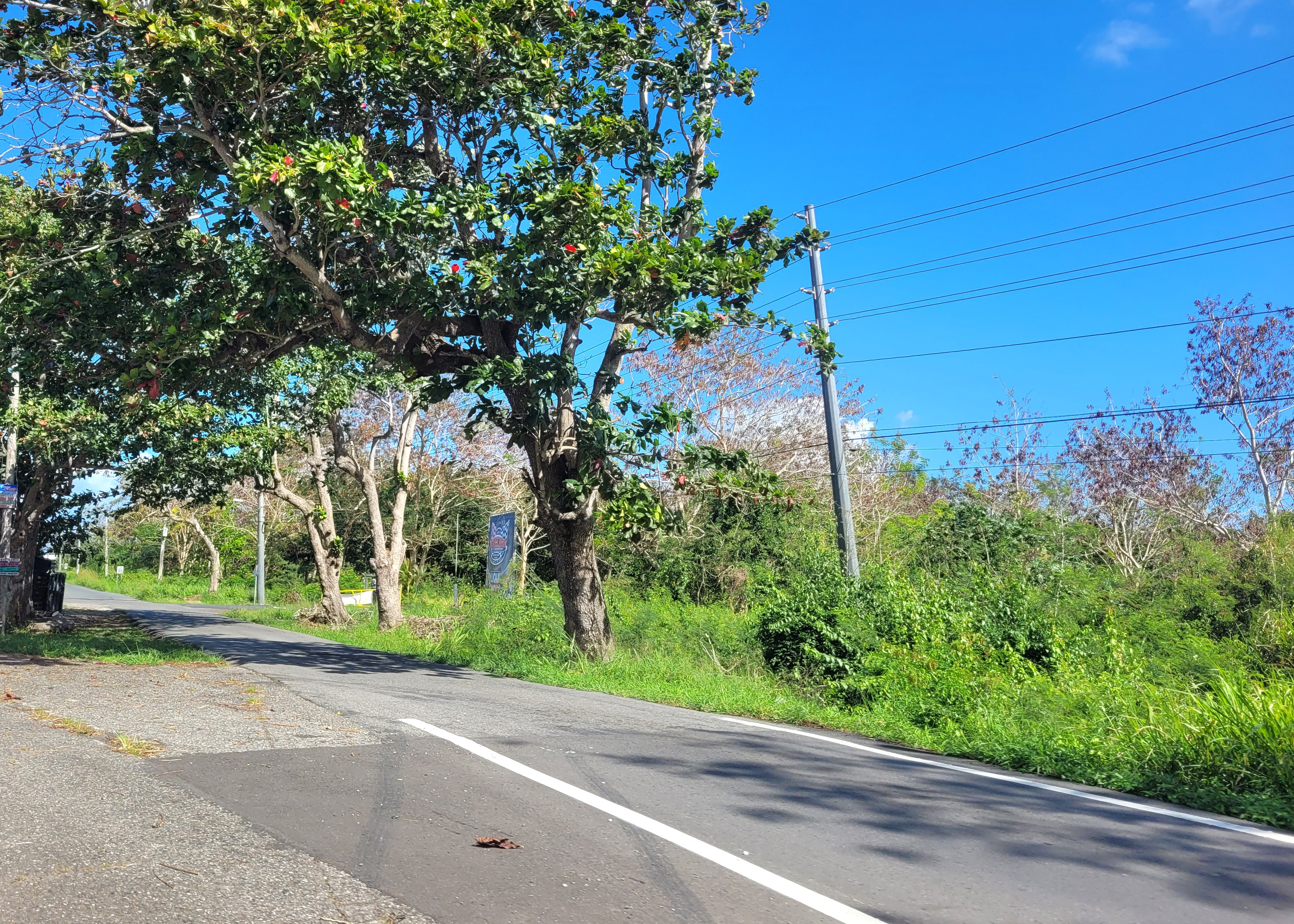
Puerto Rico Highway 6681 in Cambalache

== See also ==
- List of communities in Puerto Rico
- List of barrios and sectors of Arecibo, Puerto Rico
