= Nature reserves in Puerto Rico =

Nature Reserve of Puerto Rico (Spanish: Reserva Natural de Puerto Rico) is a title and special designation given by the upper house of the Legislative Assembly of Puerto Rico (Senado de Puerto Rico) to specific natural areas or features throughout the territory. All nature reserves in Puerto Rico are protected by Puerto Rico Law #150, first approved on August 8, 1988, better known as the Puerto Rico Natural Heritage Program Act (Ley del Programa de Patrimonio Natural de Puerto Rico) that seeks to protect the natural resources of the island for the purpose of natural preservation and tourism. These are managed by different agencies within the Puerto Rico Department of Natural and Environmental Resources (Departamento de Recursos Naturales y Ambientales de Puerto Rico, or DRNA for short), public-private partnerships such as the Conservation Trust of Puerto Rico (Fideicomiso de Conservación de Puerto Rico) and its management unit Para la naturaleza, and other grassroots and community institutions and programs.

== List of nature reserves in Puerto Rico ==
List of nature reserves (reservas naturales) in Puerto Rico
| No. | Nature reserve | Image | Municipalities | Est. | Area (acres) | Description |
|---|---|---|---|---|---|---|
| 1 | Abey | | Salinas | 2023 | 6 | Forested hydrological and geological basin with designated Specially Protected Rustic Soil (Suelo Rústico Especialmente Protegido or SREP) important for the stability of wetlands and mangrove forests of the Jobos Bay National Estuarine Research Reserve and the Aguirre State Forest. |
| 2 | Aguas Buenas Cave System | | Aguas Buenas, Caguas and Cidra | 2002 | 1,800 | One of the oldest karst zones in the island and an important bat preserve, it protects a cave system with ties to the history of culture of Aguas Buenas that is the source of the Bairoa and Cagüitas rivers, important tributaries of the Loíza River hydrological basin. |
| 3 | Caja de Muertos | | Juana Díaz and Ponce | 1980 | 423 | Small archipelago consisting of the islands of Caja de Muertos, Cayo Morrillito, Cayo Berbería, and their surrounding reefs and waters in the Caribbean Sea. One of the few remaining Puerto Rican dry forests in addition to mangrove forests, caves and an important sea turtle nesting site. One of the last four places in the world where higo chumbo Harrisia portoricensis can be found. |
| 4 | Camuy River | | Camuy and Hatillo | 2018 | 2,536 | Karstic canyon sculpted by the Camuy River as it flows out from the Camuy River Caverns and into the Northern Puerto Rico Karst region and the Atlantic Ocean. The canyon is highly forested with notable geological features such as caves and cliffs that are the habitat of key species such as bats and the Puerto Rican boa. The reserve also protects wetland areas that are formed close to the river mouth. |
| 5 | Caño La Boquilla | | Añasco and Mayagüez | 2002 | 187 | Large caño or wetland formed by the outflow of the Añasco River into the Añasco Bay between Punta Algarrobo in Mayagüez and La Puente in Añasco. The wetland is characterized by swampy areas and mangrove forests that are home to a high diversity of birds. |
| 6 | Caño Martín Peña | | San Juan | 2002 | 188 | Revitalized mangrove forest along the Martín Peña Channel that represents one of the few remaining natural areas of the San Juan Bay and its metropolitan area. Although it is home to invasive species such as iguanas and caimans it also contains a high diversity of migratory birds and species such as the West Indian manatee. Part of the San Juan Bay National Estuary, the only tropical estuary in the National Estuary Program network. |
| 7 | Caño Tiburones | | Arecibo | 1998 | 4,777 | The largest swamp and wetland area in Puerto Rico formed and preserved by the poor drainage of clay and peat deposits along the greater Northern Puerto Rico karst. It was severely affected by nearby sugarcane industrial activity in the 20th century. The area is home to 206 bird species, and, in the past, it used to contain the largest flocks of Caribbean flamingo (Phoenicopterus ruber) in the island. Designated Important Bird Area. |
| 8 | Cayo Ratones | | Cabo Rojo | 2005 | 1 | Small island located off the coast of Cabo Rojo, the protected area is the smallest in Puerto Rico and it includes the island and its surrounding coral reefs. It was formerly covered by red mangrove (Rhizophora mangle) which are now being regrown as part of a revitalization project. Managed as part of the wider Boquerón State Forest. |
| 9 | Cialitos River | | Ciales and Jayuya | 1999 | 5,133 | Critical forest area that creates an ecological corridor between the Cialitos River basin and Los Tres Picachos State Forest that represents a geological transition zone between the volcanogenic Cordillera Central and the Northern Puerto Rico karst. The reserve has a high diversity of endemic species such as the Puerto Rican magnolia (Magnolia portoricensis) and the Puerto Rican sharp-shinned hawk. |
| 10 | Cibuco Swamp | | Vega Baja | 1992 | 971 | Large swamp area that surrounds the Cibuco River delta. Contains mangrove and broadleaf forests in addition to sandy wetlands. |
| 11 | Condado Lagoon | | San Juan | 2013 | 99 | Unique body of water bound by El Boquerón and the El Condado and Isla Grande peninsulas. Surrounded by revitalized mangrove forests, the unique morphology of the lagoon formerly attracted large numbers of West Indian manatees, which can still be seen today in smaller numbers. Also known as the Professor Jaime Benítez Rexach Nature Reserve, it is part of the San Juan Bay National Estuary. |
| 12 | Cueva del Indio | | Arecibo | 2015 | 11 | Karstic cave and cliffs formed by erosion from wind and ocean waves, the unique geological formation features Taino petroglyphs. The reserve includes the surrounding waters that contain large tracts of turtlegrass meadows that are home of and food to animal species such as sea turtles and West Indian manatees. Designated Important Bird Area. |
| 13 | Espinar Swamp and Caño Madre Vieja | | Aguada and Aguadilla | 2019 | 93 | Estuarine area formed by the Culebrinas River that contains ecosystems such as forested swamps, wetlands, dunes and a sea turtle nesting site. Local folklore describes the site as the possible landing site of Christopher Columbus in Puerto Rico in 1493. The floodable area also attracts numerous migratory birds. |
| 14 | Espíritu Santo River | | Río Grande | 2011 | 4,892 | Important wetland ecosystem located at the mouth of the Espíritu Santo River that contains all four species of mangrove in Puerto Rico and is spawn site to numerous species of commercial value for local fishing communities, particularly spiny lobsters and blue land crabs, locally known as jueyes. The reserve also includes large marine areas home to turtlegrass meadows that attract animals such as manatees and leatherback sea turtles. |
| 15 | Finca Belvedere | | Cabo Rojo | 2002 | 1,649 | Secondary forest located in and around a former sugarcane plantation that demonstrates the processes of natural reforestation. Ruins of the former hacienda and the trapiche can still be appreciated today. Managed as a unit of the wider Boquerón State Forest. |
| 16 | Finca Nolla | | Camuy | 2018 | 5,572 | Coastal wetlands and secondary forest located between the Camuy River delta and the limestone cliffs of northwestern Puerto Rico. It attracts both land and aquatic migratory birds. The reserve also protects a large marine tract of seagrass meadows and rocky reefs locally known as peñones. Modern revitalization projects are underway to re-establish sand dunes, as the area formerly contained some of the largest in the island. |
| 17 | Finca Seven Seas | | Fajardo | 1999 | 107 | Secondary forest found in former farmlands that acts as an ecological corridor between Las Cabezas de San Juan and the larger Northeast Ecological Corridor; Seven Seas is managed as a unit of the former and the territory includes the Seven Seas Beach. |
| 18 | Fortuna Beach | | Luquillo | 2021 | 4 | Created to mitigate the effects of beach erosion that threaten not only the sandy beach but also the community of the same name in the municipality of Luquillo. It also aims to restore former riparian ecosystems that served as a shield to the process of erosion. |
| 19 | Guayama Reef | | Arroyo | 1999 | 218 | Barrier reef located off the coasts of Arroyo that forms part of a larger coral reef system that extends from southeastern Puerto Rico to Caja de Muertos. The protected area is managed in coordination with the Jobos Bay National Estuarine Research Reserve. |
| 20 | Hacienda La Esperanza | | Manatí | 1975 | 2,088 | Extensive and diverse ecosystem that represents a transition between the Northern Puerto Rico karst highlands and the rocky Atlantic coast that includes grasslands, mogotes, wetlands, limestone cliffs and scenic beaches. Since 2020 it forms part of a larger ecological system named the Manatí Coastal Corridor. Designated Important Bird Area. |
| 21 | Humacao | | Humacao and Naguabo | 1986 | 3,094 | Protected coastal ecosystems including wetlands, lagoons, mangroves, secondary forests in a former sugarcane plantation and a former Second World War military outpost, and a rare Pterocarpus forest. Also known as the Punta Santiago reserve, the area represents a lifeline to the nearby fishing communities in addition to functioning as a natural barrier against incoming hurricanes. Designated Important Bird Area. |
| 22 | Inés María Mendoza | | Yabucoa | 1975 | 280 | Dramatic headlands of the Sierra Pandura that contain a small but diverse tract of tropical rainforest, a compact marshy wetland and scenic beaches surrounded by cliffs composed of highly sedimentary rock which results in unique geological formations. The site is home to the rare and endangered ortegon tree (Coccoloba rugosa). |
| 23 | Joyuda Lagoon | | Cabo Rojo | 2000 | 300 | One of the only two natural reservoirs in Puerto Rico. It attracts many species of migratory birds, particularly waterfowl. In addition to its ecological value the lagoon is important for the nearby fishing village of the same name. Managed as a unit of the wider Boquerón State Forest. |
| 24 | La Cordillera Reef | | Fajardo | 1978 | 29,653 | One of the largest barrier reefs in the territory is home to many marine species such as sea turtles, manatees and dolphins, it contains vast seagrass meadows and numerous cays and small islands made of limestone that function as seabird nesting sites. It is also important to local fishing communities of eastern Puerto Rico. Designated component of the marine and terrestrial Culebra Important Bird Area. |
| 25 | La Parguera | | Lajas | 1979 | 633 | One of the most threatened bioregions in the island, it contains mangrove forests across numerous cays and islets that represent a lifeline not only to marine species such as manatees but also to the local fishing communities. It is also home to Bahía Fosforecente, one of the three year-round bioluminescent bays in Puerto Rico, and areas of salinas or salt flats that were historically used as part of the nearby sugarcane industries. Managed as a unit of the wider Boquerón State Forest. Designated Important Bird Area. |
| 26 | La Soplaera | | Peñuelas | 2018 | 4 | Small hydrological basin containing a scenic system of steep waterfalls, the most famous of which is La Soplaera, and charcas formed by the outflow of the Guayanés River out of the Guilarte massif in the western Cordillera Central of Puerto Rico. |
| 27 | Las Cabachuelas Caves | | Ciales and Morovis | 2012 | 1,000 | Large cave system located in the heart of the Northern Puerto Rico karst country. In addition to its ecological value as an important bat area and for sustainability of the hydrological basin of the Manatí River, it also contains Taino petroglyphs and sites of archaeological value. |
| 28 | Las Cabezas de San Juan | | Fajardo | 1986 | 1,908 | The north-easternmost peninsula of the main island of Puerto Rico contains numerous headlands with dramatic sea cliffs, mangrove forests, lagoons and, most famously, Laguna Grande, one of the three year-round bioluminescent bays in Puerto Rico. The reserve is also of historical interest due to its historic lighthouse and its relation to the US invasion during the Spanish-American War in 1898. |
| 29 | Las Cucharillas Swamp | | Cataño and Guaynabo | 2008 | 1,235 | Urban wetland ecosystem containing marshes, bogs and three out of the four species of mangrove found in Pguerto Rico. In addition to its ecological value the wetland helps mitigate floods in nearby Cataño. It is also part of the San Juan Bay National Estuary. Designated Important Bird Area. |
| 30 | Las Piedras del Collado | | Salinas | 2000 | 19 | Las Piedras del Collado, popularly known as Las Tetas de Cayey and sometimes as Las Tetas de Salinas, are a set of steep breast-shaped hills that dramatically rise at the southwestern crest of the Sierra de Cayey represent a geological, geographical and cultural landmark in the towns of Cayey, Salinas and central Puerto Rico as a whole. |
| 31 | Lucía Beach Wetland | | Yabucoa | 2014 | 140 | Small but important wetland ecosystem surrounded by a secondary forest located in a former sugarcane plantation, and Lucía Beach, sometimes known in English as Dead Dog Beach or Sato Beach due to the large population of abandoned and stray dogs. |
| 32 | Luis Peña Channel | | Culebra | 1999 | 1,173 | Protected waterway located between the island of Culebra and Cayo Luis Peña that contains important marine ecosystems such as coral reefs. The protected area includes the coastal areas of northwestern Culebra and its beaches and is bordered by the Culebra National Wildlife Refuge. |
| 33 | Manatí Coastal Corridor | | Manatí | 2020 | 10,908 | Ecological corridor consisting of the coastal areas of the municipality of Manatí. It includes other nature reserves such as Hacienda La Esperanza and Mar Chiquita, in addition to popular beaches such as Los Tubos and Poza de las Mujeres, and adjacent coastal ecosystems such as wetlands, lagoons, mangrove forests and limestone cliffs. |
| 34 | Mar Chiquita | | Manatí | 2021 | 284 | Protected limestone cove and its neighborghing beach, Mar Chiquita, a geological landmark and popular tourist attraction. It forms part of a larger ecological system named the Manatí Coastal Corridor. |
| 35 | Mata de Plátano Field Station | | Arecibo | 2014 | 130 | Protected area that surrounds a research station managed by the Interamerican University of Puerto Rico established to study the unique relationship between Puerto Rican boas and bats that live in the numerous caves and sinkholes in this portion of the Northern Puerto Rico karst. Designated component of the Karso del Norte Important Bird Area. |
| 36 | Mona and Monito Islands | | Mayagüez | 1986 | 38,893 | Mona Island, the largest island of the Mona Passage, represents one of the most ecologically important areas of Puerto Rico due to its unique geography and geology, its dry forests and its high levels of endemicity represented by species such as the Mona ground iguana and the rare higo chumbo (Harrisia portoricensis). The island is also of great historical importance with millennial evidence of human activity represented by its indigenous and colonial archaeological and architectural heritage. Despite its small size, nearby Monito Island is also of ecological importance being home to endemic species such as the Monito gecko. This is the largest protected area in Puerto Rico, designated an Important Bird Area and, since 1980, a National Natural Landmark. |
| 37 | Northeast Ecological Corridor | | Fajardo and Luquillo | 2008 | 2,970 | Wildlife corridor in northeastern Puerto Rico that represents the coastal portion of the hydrological basin that corresponds to the Sierra de Luquillo and El Yunque National Forest bioregion. In addition to its coastal ecosystems, it also contains large tracts of secondary forests that were once large sugarcane plantations. The area is home to 866 species of flora and fauna, 54 of which are listed by the DRNA as either rare, threatened, endangered and endemic. It also contains some of the best-preserved beaches in the island, many of which are important nesting sites for sea turtles such as the leatherback and green sea turtles. |
| 38 | Planadas-Yeyesa | | Cayey and Salinas | 2016 | 2,457 | Protected mountainous area of the same portion of the Sierra de Cayey that contains Cerro Las Tetas. The area is centered around the mountains of Yeyesa and Planada, and includes the forested canyons created by the Lapa and Nigua rivers and is home to 198 species of trees and to 11 of the 17 endemic bird species found in Puerto Rico. In addition to its ecological value the area contains numerous Taino petroglyphs. |
| 39 | Playa Grande El Paraíso | | Dorado | 2016 | 52 | Coastal and riparian ecosystems bound by the La Plata and Cocal River mouths. It contains popular beaches such as El Caracol, El Paraíso and Parchola, which as a whole constitute the largest nesting site of leatherback sea turtles in Puerto Rico. |
| 40 | Pterocarpus Forest of Humacao | | Humacao | 1986 | 933 | One of the two best preserved Pterocarpus forests in the region along with the Palmas del Mar Tropical Forest. Additionally, it contains two lagoons that are important bird sites that attract waterfowl and migratory species such as West Indian whistling ducks and white-cheeked pintails. Managed as a unit of the larger Humacao Nature Reserve. Designated Important Bird Area. |
| 41 | Punta Ballenas | | Guánica | 1991 | 162 | Protected area consisting of Punta Ballenas, a limestone peninsula managed as a unit of the Guánica State Forest, and a chain of cays and coral reefs known as the Cayos de Caña Gorda, small mangrove-forested islands that are a critical bird and manatee habitat. The protected area includes Cayo Aurora, locally known as Gilligan Island, a popular tourist attraction. Designated component of the Karso del Sur Important Bird Area. |
| 42 | Punta Cabuyones | | Ponce | 2018 | 2,373 | Large wetland area containing swamps, mangroves and marshes in addition to shrubland located in and around Punta Cabuyones along the Bay of Ponce. Along with neighboring Punta Cucharas his ecosystem represents the largest relatively untouched tract of swamplands in the Caribbean coast of Puerto Rico and contains regionally endemic species such as the Ponce anole and the Ponce mayten.bio |
| 43 | Punta Cucharas | | Ponce | 2008 | 4,093 | Wetlands and shrublands surround a large lagoon known as Laguna de las Salinas. Its beaches are important migratory wading bird sites and its dry forest are home to endangered species of cacti and rare grasses. Along with neighboring Punta Cabuyones this ecosystem represents the largest relatively untouched tract of swamplands in the Caribbean coast of Puerto Rico. Designated Important Bird Area. |
| 44 | Punta Guaniquilla | | Cabo Rojo | 1977 | 450 | Punta Guaniquilla is a heavily forested peninsula that borders the Bay of Boquerón to the south and contains Guaniquilla Lagoon, a prehistoric body of water that contains the remnants of some of the oldest orographic features of Puerto Rico in the form of peculiar karstic rock formations. In addition to its natural value, it also contains notable indigenous archaeological sites, the remnants of colonial plantations, popular beaches such as Buyé, and a cave popularly attributed to the pirate Roberto Cofresí. Recognized component of the Guaniquilla and Boquerón Important Bird Area. |
| 45 | Punta Guilarte | | Arroyo | 2021 | 750 | Protected coastal secondary forest located at the former sugarcane plantation bordered by the Punta Guilarte Vacation Center and the NRHP-listed Punta Figuras Lighthouse. It also contains mangroves, lagoons and important riparian ecosystems that are home to numerous species of aquatic birds. |
| 46 | Punta Petrona | | Santa Isabel | 2021 | 985 | Protected cape covered by salinas and mangrove forests. The protected area includes a number of small islands and cays that form part of a larger archipelago and coral reef system that extends between the southeastern coast of Puerto Rico until Caja de Muertos off the coast of Ponce. It is managed as a unit of the Aguirre State Forest. |
| 47 | Punta Tuna Wetland | | Maunabo | 2012 | 106 | Small but important wetland area containing marshes and mangrove forests. It is located in a small but peculiar geographical depression part of a wider transition zone between the heavily forested cliffs formed by the Sierra de Guardarraya and the Punta Tuna Beach, orographically marked by the promontory where the historic lighthouse is located. |
| 48 | Punta Vientos Wetland | | Patillas | 2008 | 97 | Punta Vientos, also known as Punta del Viento, contains an important wetland ecosystem formed by the outflow of the Jacaboa River into the Caribbean Sea. It is also home to sand dunes and a Pterocarpus forest. The northern portion of the reserve contains a large swampy lagoon and a secondary forest that was once an hato or cattle grazing area and a plantation. |
| 49 | San Juan Ecological Corridor | | San Juan | 2003 | 971 | Ecological corridor belonging to the Northern Puerto Rico karst geological region that protects the Piedras River hydrological basin in addition to the reforested mogotes and hills within the municipal boundaries of San Juan. It is made up by urban forests found in the Doña Inés Mendoza, Los Capuchinos and Nuevo Milenio forests, the University of Puerto Rico Botanical Garden, the former Spanish-built aqueduct system, and other protected riparian areas of Río Piedras, Cupey and Caimito. |
| 50 | Tortuguero Lagoon | | Manatí and Vega Baja | 1979 | 725 | One of the only two naturally formed reservoirs in Puerto Rico and the second largest natural freshwater lake in the island after Laguna Cartagena. Although it is home to many invasive species such as caimans and tilapia, it still contains a high degree of endemicity with bird species such as the Puerto Rican spindalis, the Puerto Rican oriole and the Adelaide's warbler being found in the preserve. |
| 51 | Tourmaline Reef | | Cabo Rojo and Mayagüez | 1998 | 16,468 | Large shelf-edge reef located off the Mayagüez Bay in the Mona Passage containing one of the largest coral coverage areas in Puerto Rican waters in addition to large seagrass prairies. In addition to its submerged components the reserve also protects rocky reefs and fishing zones important to the local economy. Its red grouper (Epinephelus guttatus) population is currently protected in order to mitigate the effects of overfishing. |
| 52 | Vega Baja and Manatí Underwater Gardens | | Manatí and Vega Baja | 2024 | 31 | Marine and coastal zones of protection created to mitigate the effects of overfishing and to preserve vast tracts of coral and seagrass home to at least 34 different species of coral, including critically endangered species such as elkhorn coral (Acropora palmata). Includes coastal areas such as Mar Bella Beach in Vega Baja. |
| 53 | Vieques Bioluminescent Bay | | Vieques | 2009 | 183 | Also known as Puerto Mosquito, it contains the best preserved of the three year-round bioluminescent bays in Puerto Rico. The reserve also protects the surrounding mangrove forests that are essential to said natural phenomenon, in addition to the dry forests and shrublands that lie outside the Vieques National Wildlife Refuge, and the area surrounding Sun Bay Beach. Designated Important Bird Area, and a National Natural Landmark since 1980. |

== List of marine reserves in Puerto Rico ==
Marine reserves (reservas marinas) in Puerto Rico are a special type of nature reserve and title that is given to special management areas that are entirely located on water. Although a type of nature reserve, these are distinct in nomenclature from nature reserves such as La Cordillera Reef Nature Reserve which has protected undersea and on-land units.

List of marine reserves (reservas marinas) in Puerto Rico
| No. | Marine reserve | Image | Municipalities | Est. | Area (acres) | Description |
|---|---|---|---|---|---|---|
| 1 | Desecheo Island Coastal Waters | | Mayagüez | 2000 | 1,670 | Created to mitigate the effects of overfishing, this area of the Mona Passage is critically located in the migratory pathway of humpback whales. The protected area also contains coral reefs and seagrass prairies. Jointly managed with the National Oceanic and Atmospheric Administration (NOAA) it completely encircles Desecheo Island and the National Wildlife Refuge of the same name. |
| 2 | Isla Verde Reef | | Carolina | 2012 | 214 | Protected coral reef home to federally protected species such as elkhorn coral. It is located off Isla Verde, it belongs to a larger barrier reef system that stretches along the coast of the San Juan metropolitan area between Punta Maldonado in Loíza in the east to Isleta de San Juan in the west. |
| 3 | Tres Palmas | | Rincón | 2004 | 7,628 | Located off the coast of Rincón, particularly the area between Steps Beach and Punta Higuero, it was established to preserve the local coral reefs from the effects of nearby coastal development. It is home to federally protected species of coral, large numbers of coral-dwelling fish and several species of cetaceans, particularly Atlantic spotted dolphins and migrating humpback whales in the deeper zones, and bottlenose dolphins in the areas closer to the beach. |

== See also ==
- Protected areas of Puerto Rico
- National Natural Landmarks in Puerto Rico
