= List of protected areas of Puerto Rico =

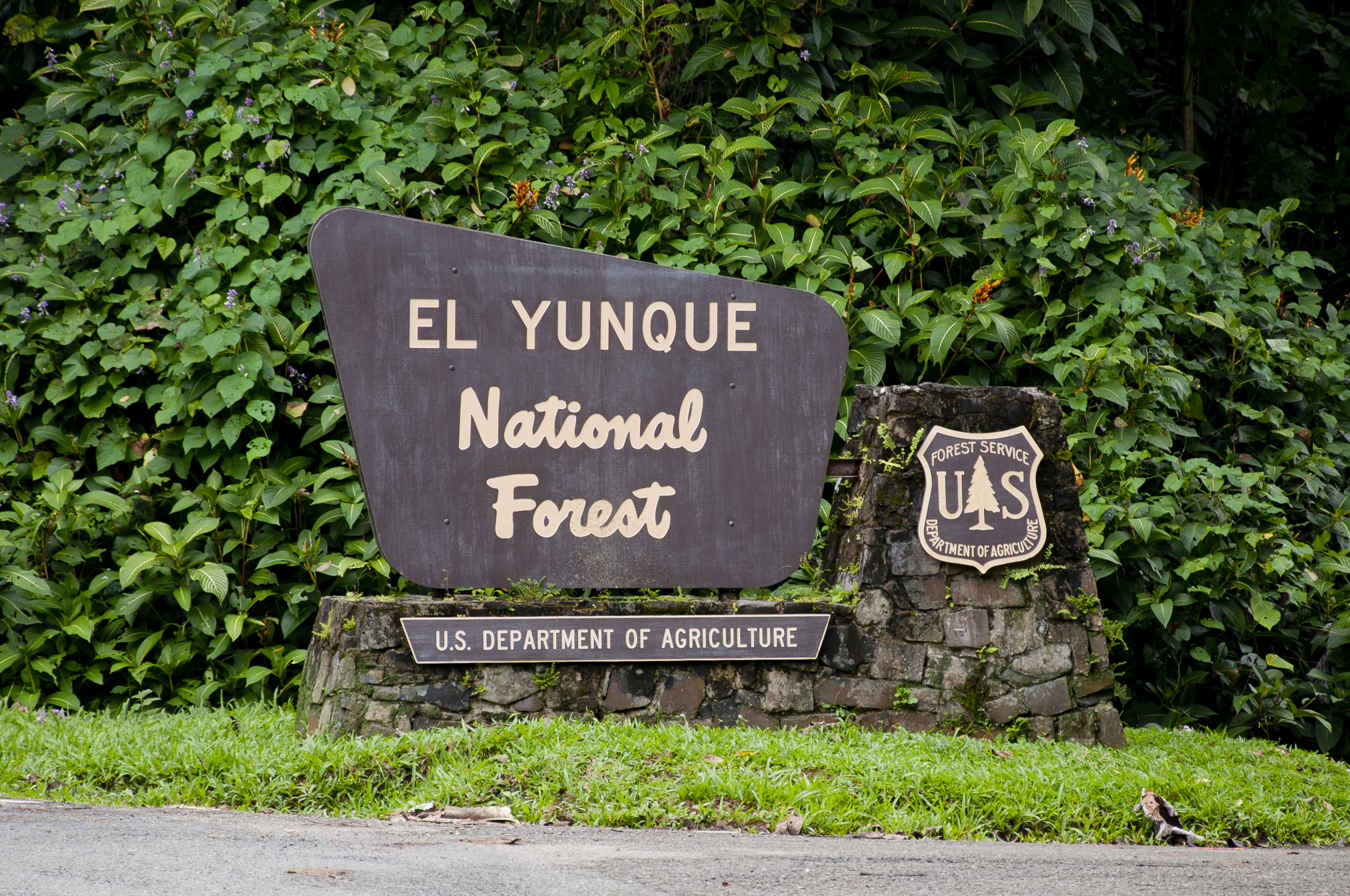
Entrance sign to El Yunque National Forest.

The protected areas of Puerto Rico include an array of natural areas in the archipelago of Puerto Rico, an unincorporated territory of the United States, managed by a number of agencies and entities belonging to both federal and commonwealth government bodies. Although Puerto Rico has no natural units in the National Park System, the biodiversity of the island is recognized and protected through a national forest, a national wildlife refuge, a national wilderness, and numerous state parks (called national parks in Puerto Rico), nature reserves, state forests, wildlife preserves and other designations on state, municipal and public-private administration levels.

== Federal level ==
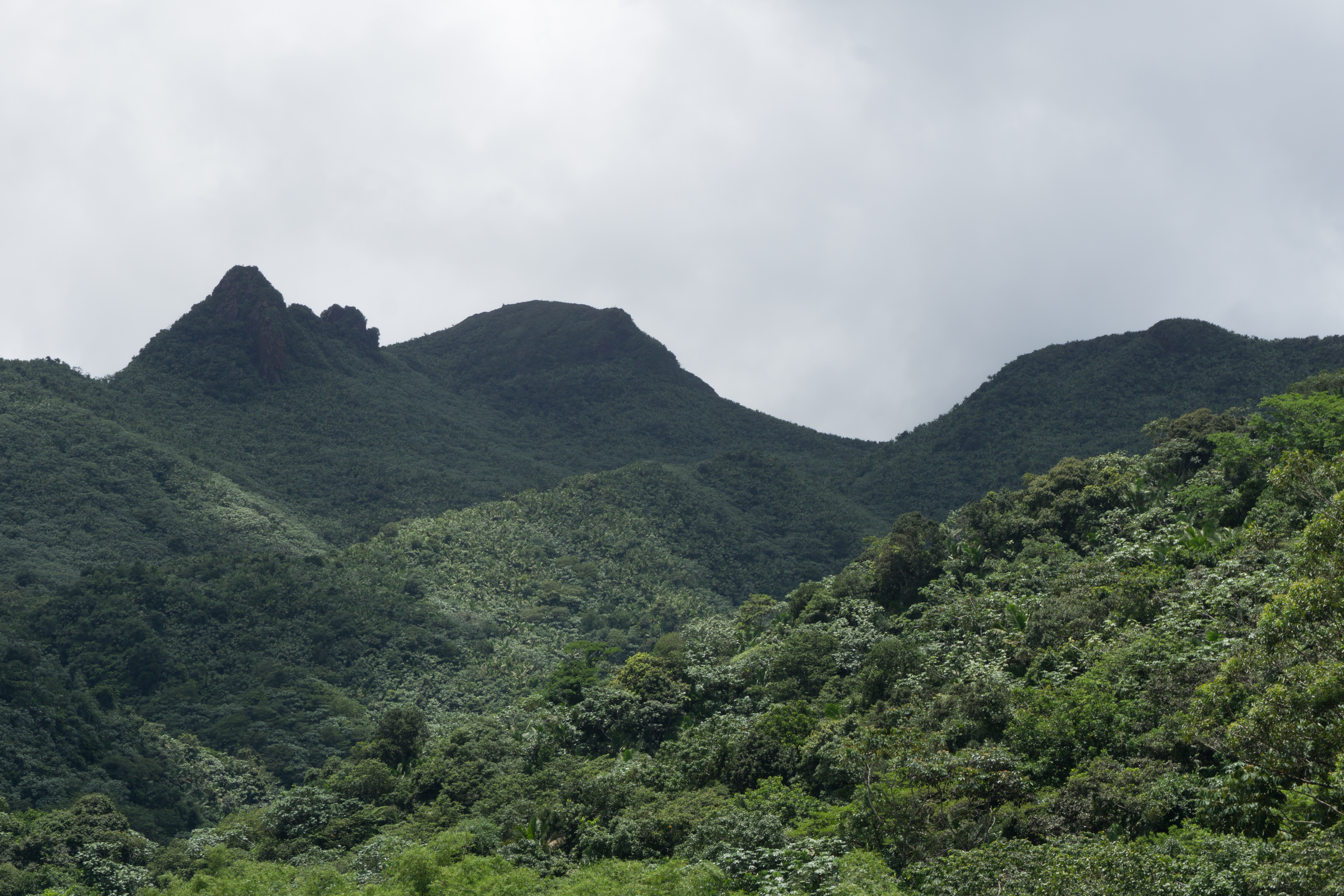
El Yunque National Forest

=== National Estuarine Research Reserves ===
- Jobos Bay

=== National Forests ===
- El Yunque

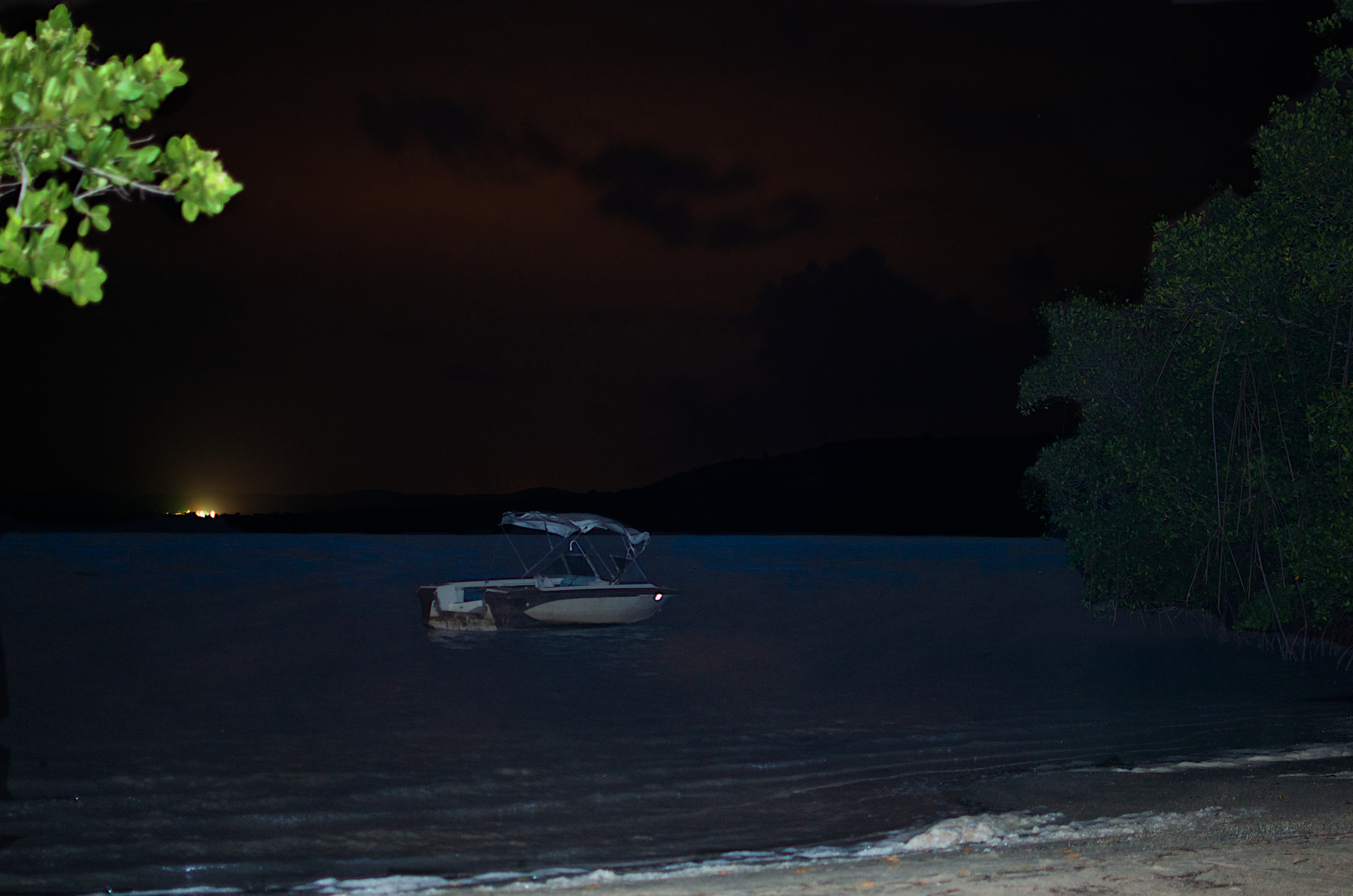
Puerto Mosquito Bioluminescent Bay, Vieques

=== National Natural Landmarks ===
- Baño de Oro Natural Area
- Cabo Rojo
- Mona and Monito Islands
- Puerto Mosquito
- Río Abajo State Forest

=== National Wild and Scenic Rivers ===
- Icacos
- La Mina
- Mameyes

=== National Wilderness Preservation System ===
- El Toro

=== National Wildlife Refuge ===
- Caribbean Islands National Wildlife Refuge spanning Puerto Rico, the U.S. Virgin Islands and Navassa Island with the following units in Puerto Rico:
  - Cabo Rojo
  - Culebra
  - Desecheo
  - Laguna Cartagena
  - Vieques

== Commonwealth level ==
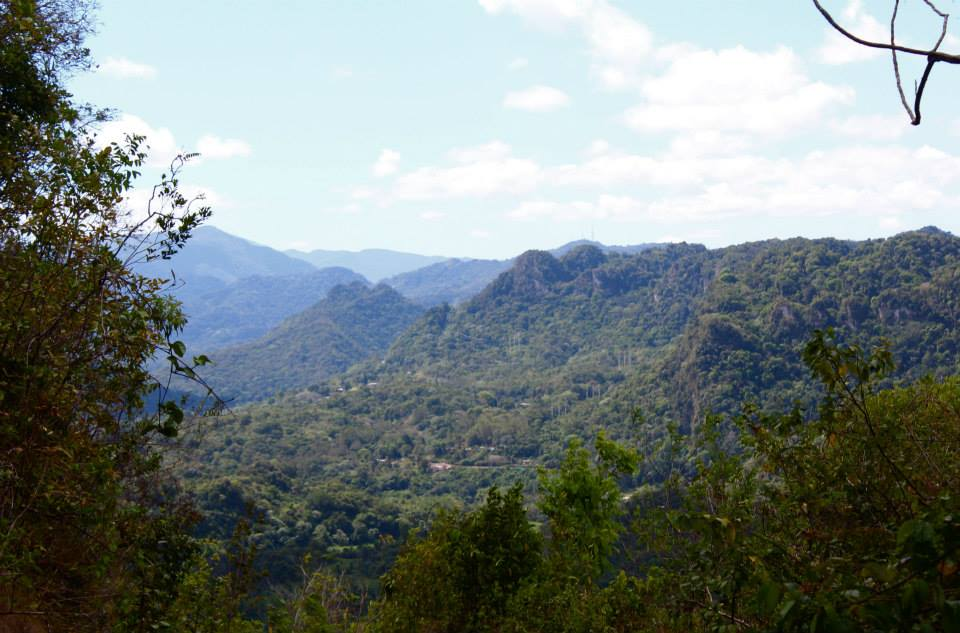
Puerto Rico Northern Karst, Arecibo

=== Compañía de Parques Nacionales (CPNPR) ===
- Boquerón
- Camuy River Caverns
- Caña Gorda
- Cerro Gordo
- Isla de Cabras
- Julio Enrique Monagas
- La Monserrate
- Lago Caonillas
- Luis Muñoz Rivera
- Manuel “Nolo” Morales
- Monte del Estado
- Punta Salinas
- Punta Santiago
- "Seven Seas"
- "Sun Bay"
- Tres Hermanos

=== Conservation Easement Sites (Servidumbres de conservación) ===
- Centro Espíritu Santo
- El Rabanal
- El Tambor
- Foreman Conservation Easement
- Gulín Farm
- Ledesma Moulier Farm
- María Luisa Farm
- Montes Oscuros
- Palmas del Mar Tropical Forest
- Picaflor Conservation Easement
- Siembra Tres Vidas

=== Conservation Zones ===
- Puerto Rico karst
  - Northern karst
  - Southern karst

=== Marine Reserves ===
- Desecheo Island Coastal Waters Marine Reserve
- Isla Verde Reef Marine Reserve
- Tres Palmas Marine Reserve

=== Nature Reserves (Reservas Naturales) ===
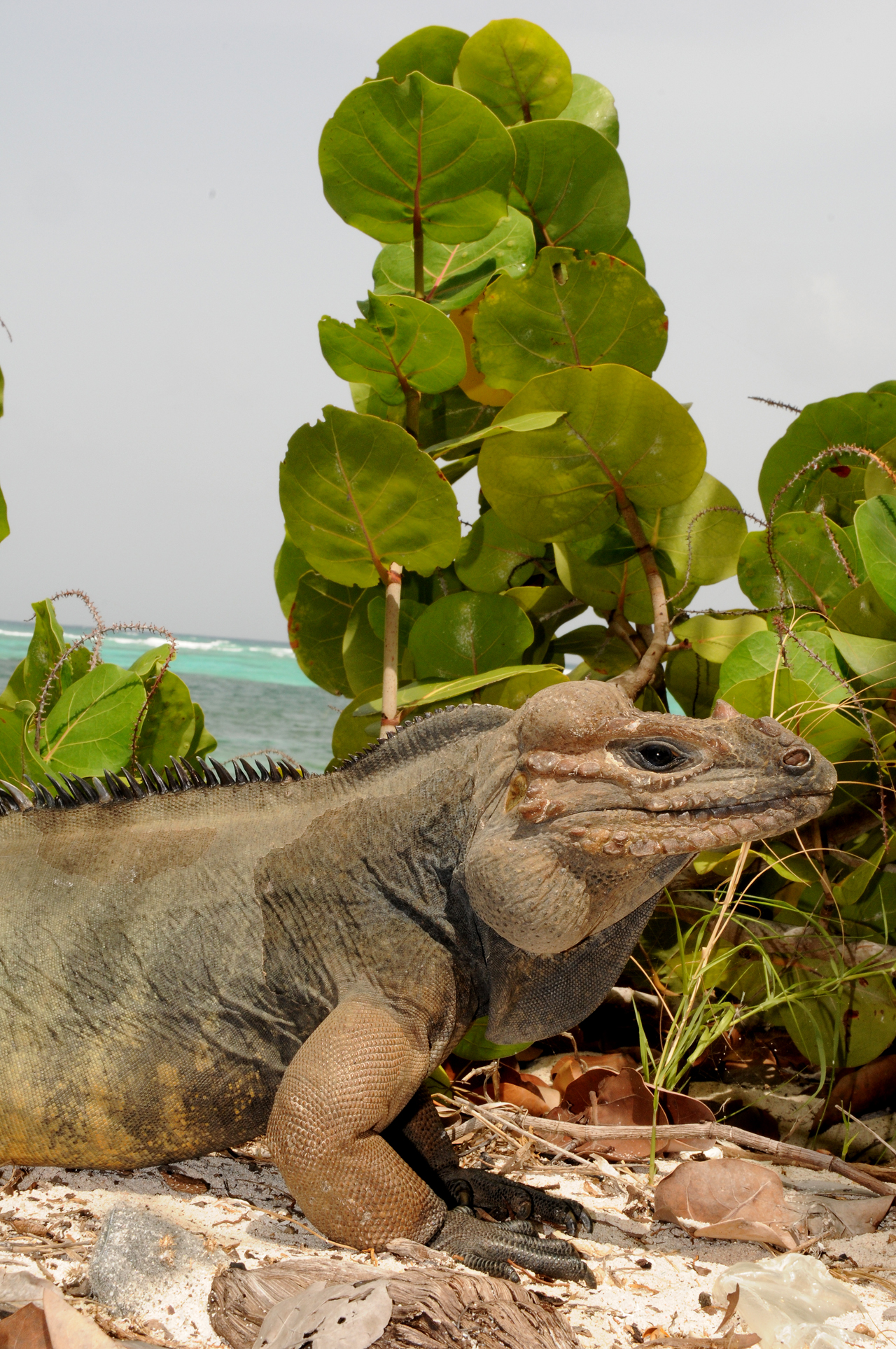
Mona Island ground iguana

- Aguas Buenas Cave System
- Belvedere Farm (part of Boquerón State Forest)
- Caja de Muertos
- Caño La Boquilla
- Caño Martín Peña Nature Reserve
- Caño Tiburones
- Cayo Ratones (part of Boquerón State Forest)
- Cialitos River Nature Reserve
- Cibuco Swamp
- Condado Lagoon
- Cueva del Indio
- Espíritu Santo River Nature Reserve
- Guayama Reef
- Hacienda La Esperanza Nature Reserve
- Humacao Nature Reserve
- Joyuda Lagoon (part of Boquerón State Forest)
- La Cordillera Reef
- La Parguera (part of Boquerón State Forest)
- Laguna Tortuguero
- Las Cabachuelas Caves
- Las Cabezas de San Juan
- Las Cucharillas Swamp
- Las Piedras del Collado
- Luis Peña Channel
- Mata de Plátano Field Station
- Mona and Monito Islands Nature Reserve
- Northeast Ecological Corridor
- Planadas-Yeyesa Nature Reserve
- Playa Grande El Paraíso
- Pterocarpus Forest of Humacao
- Punta Ballenas Nature Reserve (part of Guánica State Forest)
- Punta Cucharas
- Punta Petrona Nature Reserve
- Punta Tuna Mangrove
- Punta Vientos Wetland
- Punta Yeguas
- San Juan Ecological Corridor
  - Cupey Arboretum
  - Doña Inés Mendoza Urban Forest
  - Los Capuchinos Forest
  - New Millennium State Forest
  - Old Piedras River Aqueduct
  - University of Puerto Rico Botanical Garden
- Tourmaline Reef
- Vieques Bioluminescent Bay (Puerto Mosquito)

=== Protected Natural Areas (Áreas naturales protegidas) ===
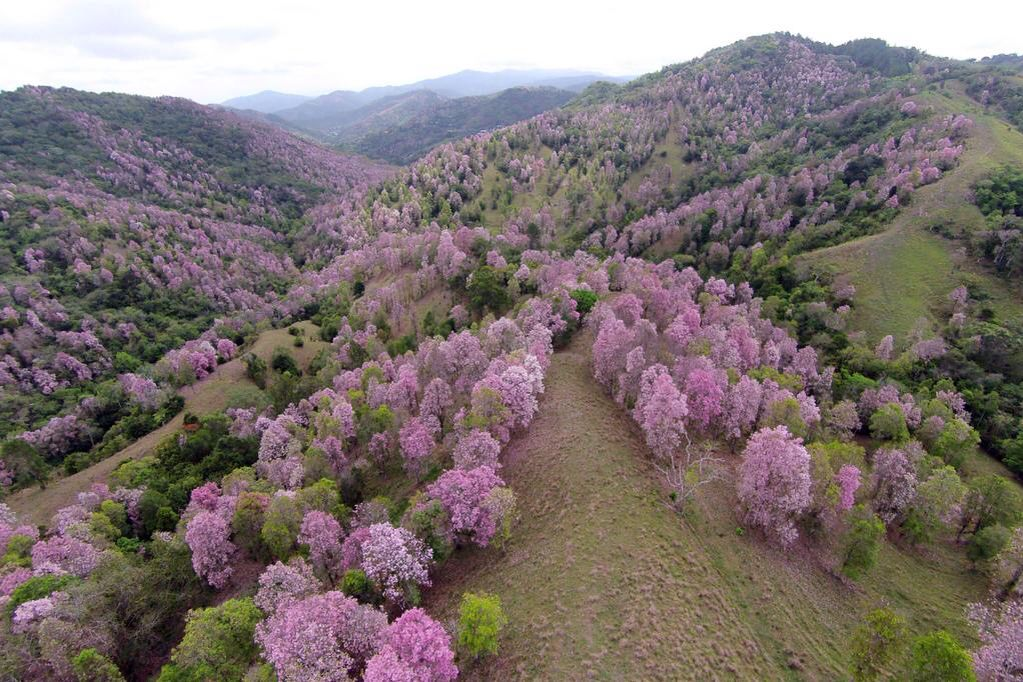
La Robleda, Cayey

- Bairoa River Protected Natural Area
- Cerro Felíz
- Cerro La Tuna
- Cerro Las Mesas
- Cordillera Sabana Alta
- Culebras Protected Natural Area
- Dorado Pterocarpus Forest
- El Conuco Protected Natural Area
- El Convento Cave
- Encantado River Protected Natural Area
- Freddie Ramírez Protected Natural Area
- Guaynabo River Protected Natural Area
- Hacienda Buena Vista Protected Natural Area
- Hacienda Lago Protected Natural Area
- Hacienda Margarita Protected Natural Area
- Hacienda Pellejas Protected Natural Area
- Hermanas Sendra Protected Natural Area
- Jacaboa River Protected Natural Area
- Jájome
- Jorge Sotomayor del Toro Protected Natural Area
- La Pitahaya Protected Natural Area
- La Robleda Protected Natural Area
- Las Bocas Canyon
- Los Frailes Farm Protected Natural Area
- Los Llanos Protected Natural Area
- Luz Martínez de Benítez Protected Natural Area
- Maricao River Protected Natural Area
- Marín Alto Protected Natural Area
- Medio Mundo and Daguao Protected Natural Area
- Ojo de Agua Protected Natural Area
- Paraíso de las Lunas Protected Natural Area
- Punta Cabullones Protected Natural Area
- Punta Pozuelo Protected Natural Area
- Punta Soldado Protected Natural Area
- Quebrada Janer Protected Natural Area
- San Cristóbal Canyon
- San Juan Park Protected Natural Area
- Sana Muerto River Protected Natural Area
- Shapiro Protected Natural Area
- Sierra Pandura
- Toa Vaca River Protected Natural Area
- Toro Negro River Protected Natural Area
- Ulpiano Casal Protected Natural Area

=== Research Reserves (Áreas de investigación) ===
- Guayama Research Area
- Manatí Research Area

=== State Forests (Bosques Estatales) ===
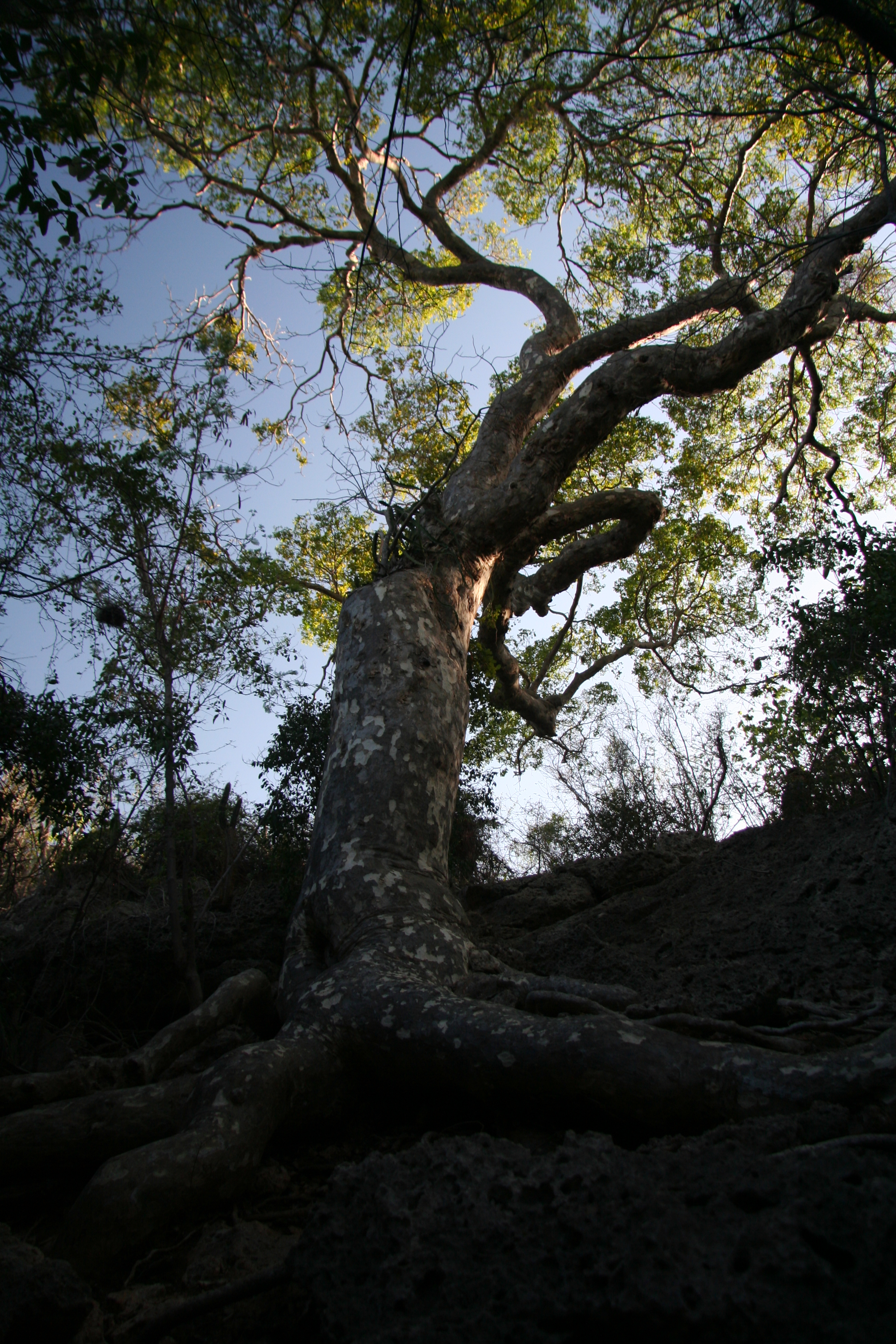
Guánica State Forest

- Aguirre
- Boquerón
- Cambalache
- Carite
- Ceiba
- Cerrillos
- Guajataca
- Guánica
- Guilarte
- Los Tres Picachos
- Maricao
- Monte Choca
- Nuevo Milenio
- Piñones
- del Pueblo
  - La Olimpia
- Río Abajo
- San Patricio
- Susúa
- Toro Negro
- Vega

=== State Wildlife Refuges (Refugios de Vida Silvestre) ===
- Boquerón Iris Alameda Wildlife Refuge (part of Boquerón State Forest)
- Cerrillos Lake Wildlife Refuge
- El Buey Natural Wildlife Refuge
- Lake Guajataca Wildlife Refuge
- Lake La Plata Wildlife Refuge
- Lake Luchetti Wildlife Refuge

=== Other protected areas ===
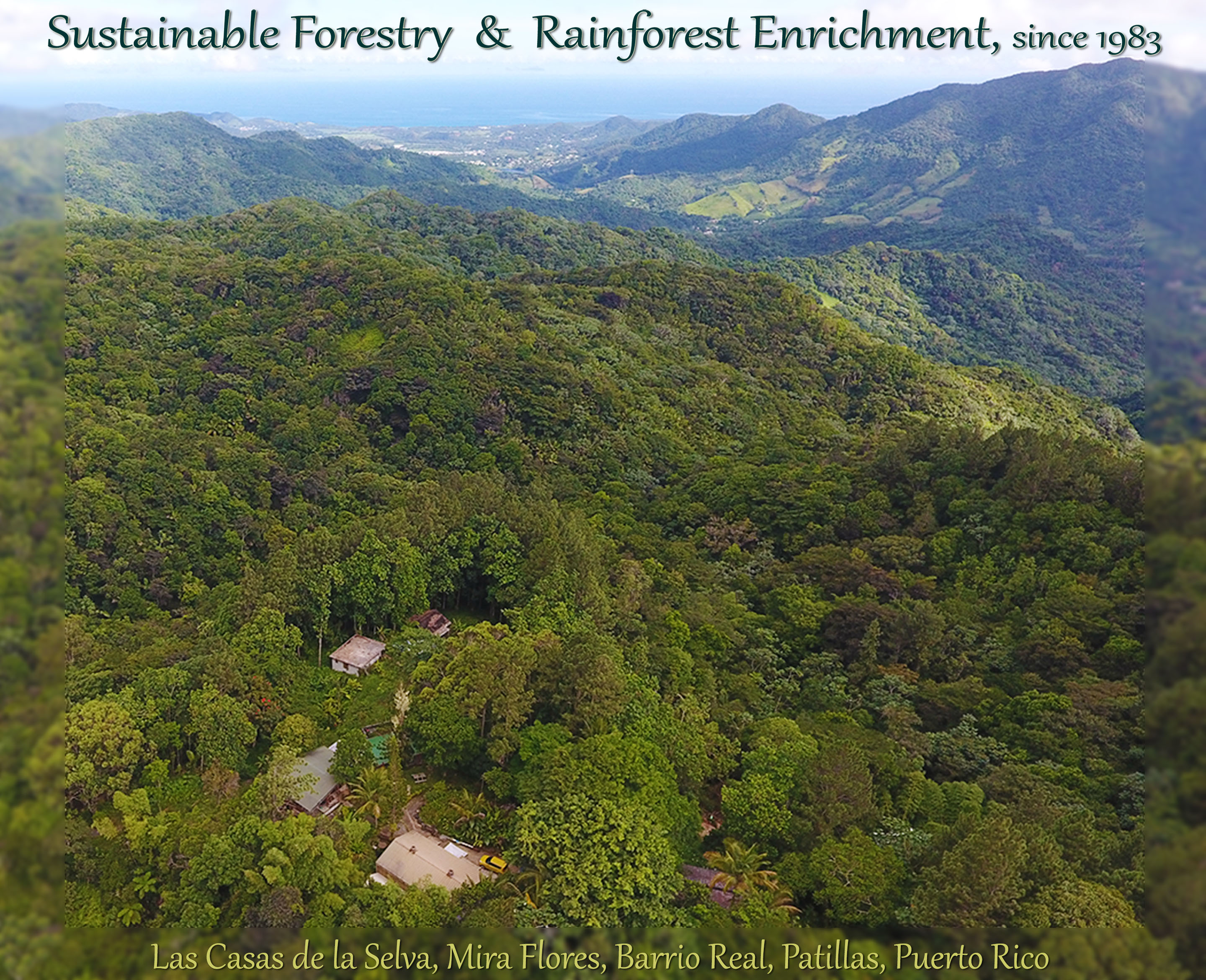
Las Casas de la Selva, Patillas

- Caguas Real Reserve (currently managed by the USFWS)
- El Tallonal
- El Verde Farm
- Finca Longo (managed by the DRNA forest service)
- José Santiago Farm
- Las Casas de la Selva
- Nolla Farm

== Municipal level ==
- Caguas Regional Forest (Caguas)
- Chalets de Bairoa Natural Area (Caguas)
- Cerro Borrás (Caguas)
- Río Hondo Community Forest (Mayagüez)
