= Porta Cordillera =

Land-locked tourism region in the central mountainous region of Puerto Rico

Porta Cordillera Central Region
- Tourism Region
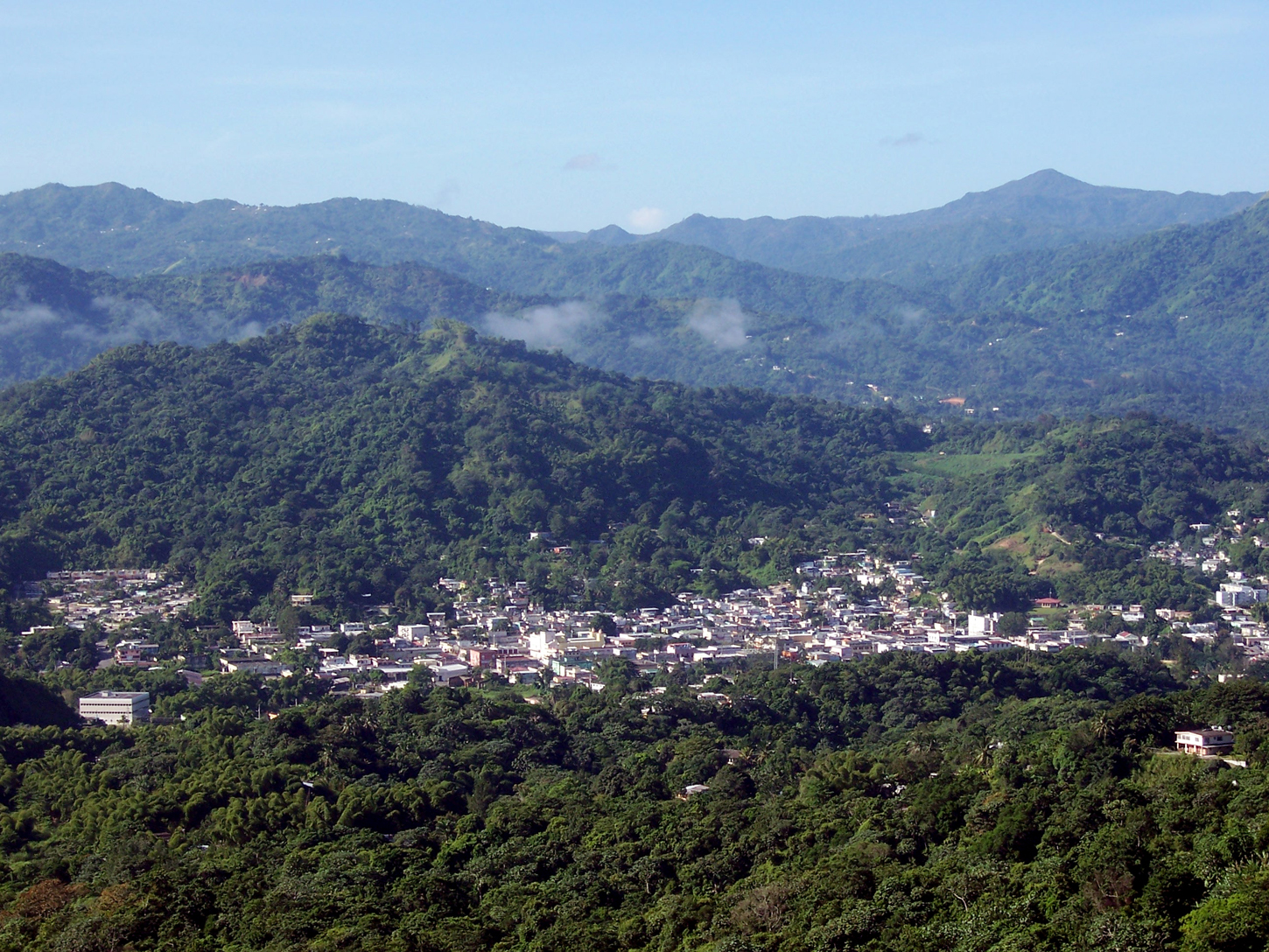
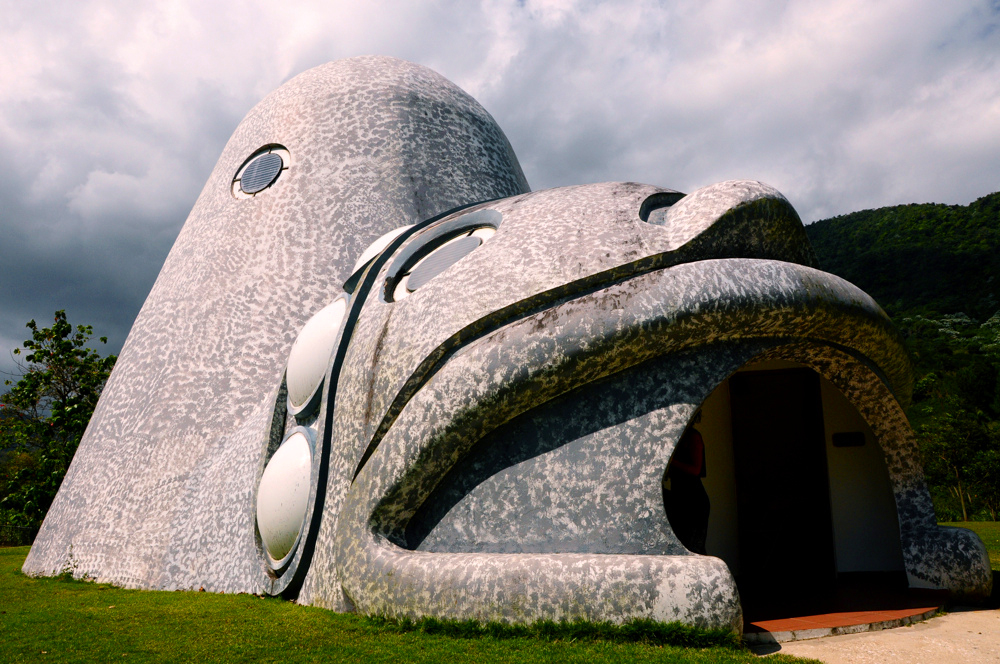
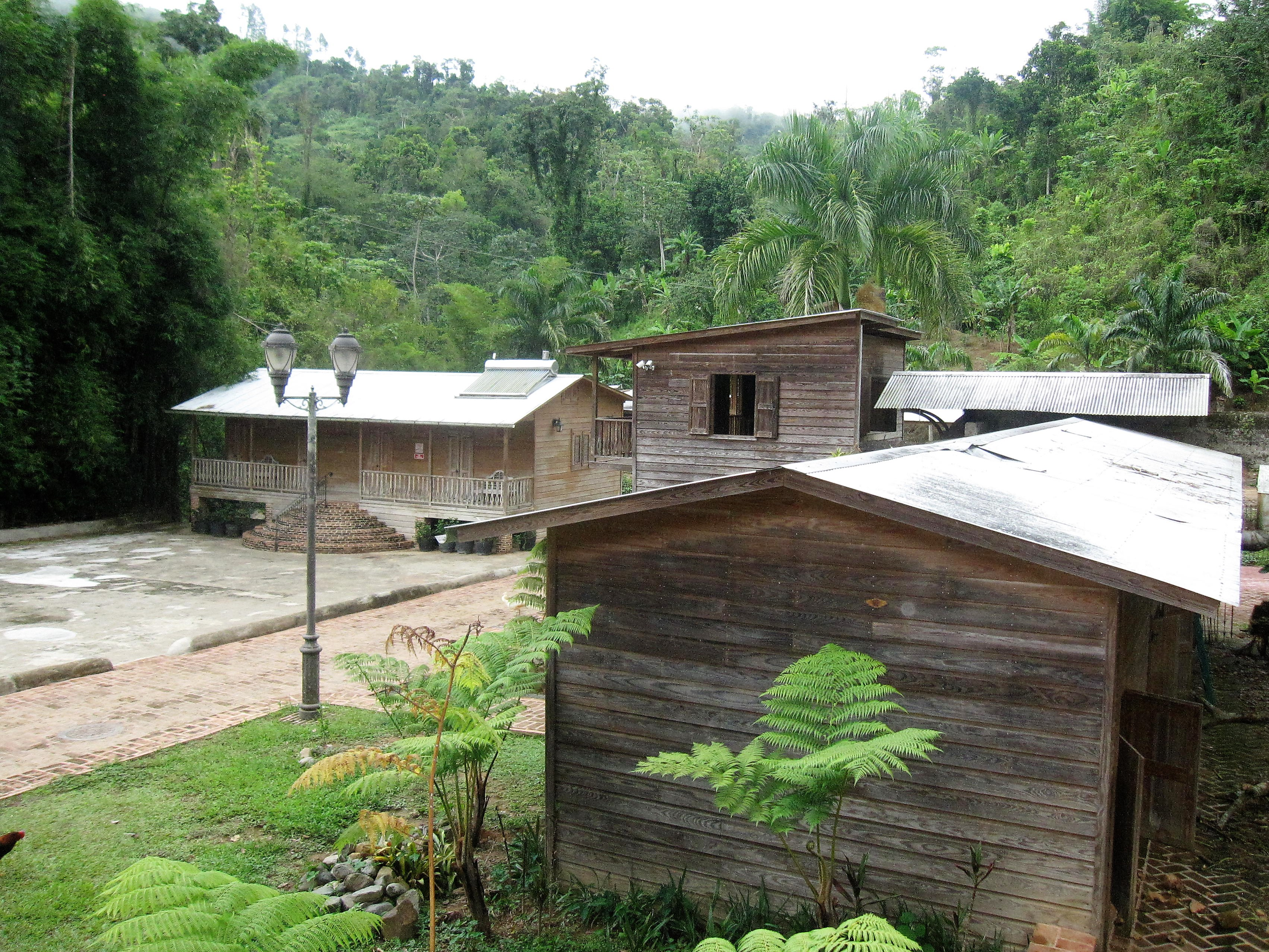
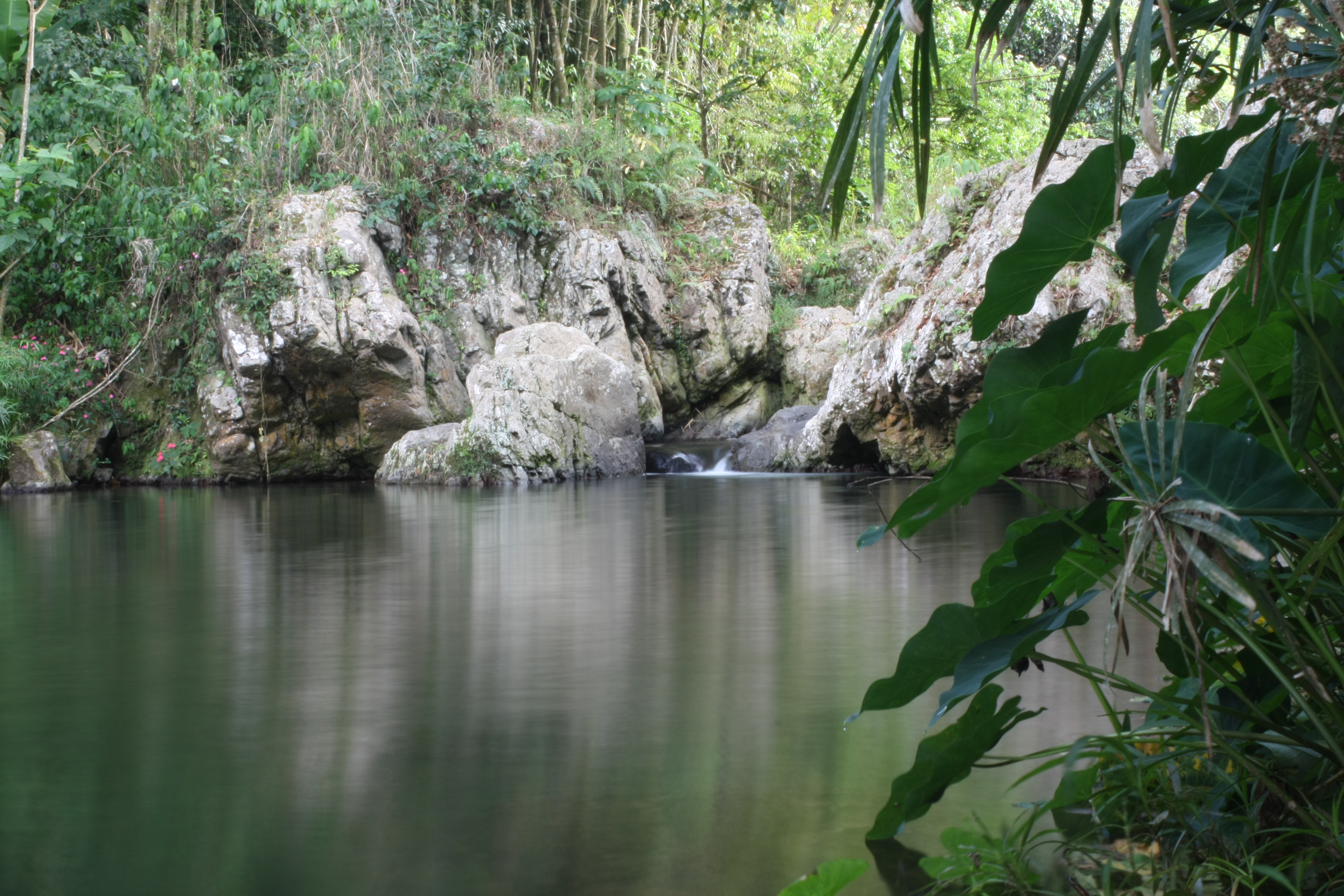
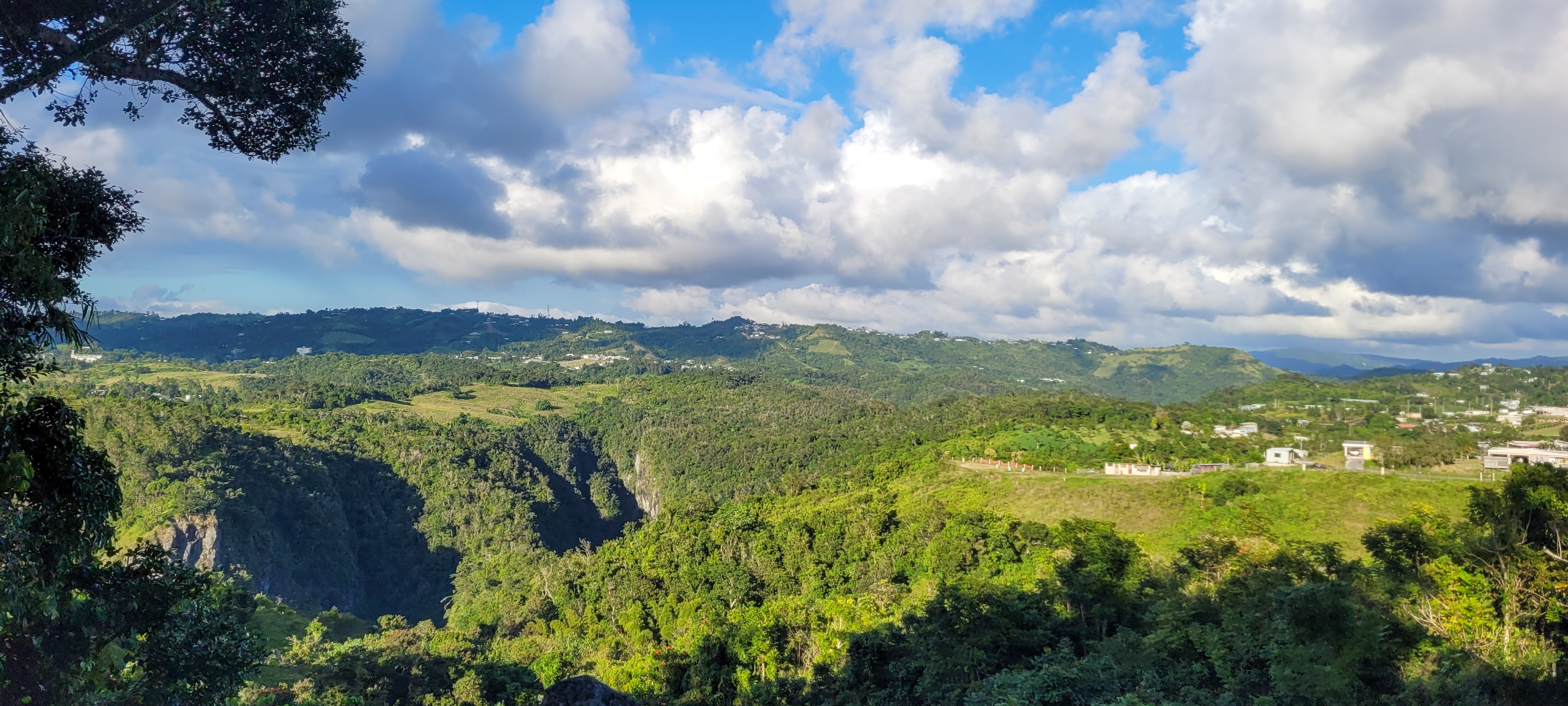
- Utuado Coabey Hacienda Lealtad Adjuntas San Cristóbal Canyon

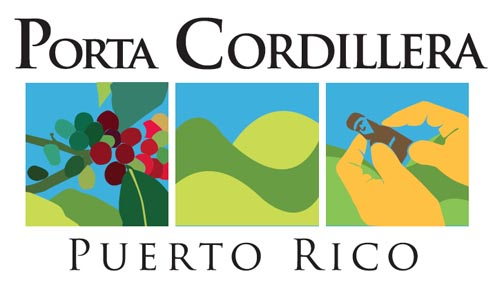
- Seal
- Nickname: Doorway to the Cordillera
- Municipalities officially belonging to the Porta Cordillera region.
- Country: United States
- Unincorporated territory: Puerto Rico
- Established: 2012
- Founder: Puerto Rico Tourism Company

Area
  - Total: 765.54 sq mi (1,982.7 km^{2})

Population
  - Total: 410,343
  - Density: 536.018/sq mi (206.958/km^{2})
- Time zone: AST

Porta Cordillera (Spanish for "dorway to the mountain range"), or simply Central Region (Región Central), is a land-locked tourism region located in the central mountainous area of Puerto Rico. Porta Cordillera was officially launched in July 2012 by the Puerto Rico Tourism Company. It consists of 16 municipalities: Aguas Buenas, Cidra, Cayey, Comerío, Aibonito, Naranjito, Barranquitas, Corozal, Orocovis, Morovis, Ciales, Jayuya, Florida, Utuado, Adjuntas and Lares.

The name Porta Cordillera translates to "Doorway to the Cordillera", where "cordillera" refers to Puerto Rico's Cordillera Central, the main central mountain range of the island. Despite the name, some of its constituent municipalities are located in the Northern Puerto Rico karst country, with municipalities such as Ciales and Utuado spanning both topographic regions and others such as Florida located entirely outside of the Cordillera Central. This tourism region is known for its stunning nature reserves, forests, coffee plantations, lakes, rivers and caves, as well as its protected karst areas. The region is also home to the highest town in Puerto Rico, the highest point in Puerto Rico (shared with Porta Caribe to the south) and to one of the largest and deepest canyons in the Caribbean. The Ruta Panorámica scenic route notably cuts through the heart of this region.

== History ==
The creation of the tourist region was the result of Puerto Rico Law 54 of 4 August 2009, authored by Rafael ‘June’ Rivera, Representative for District 28, which comprises 4 of the 16 municipalities of the tourism region: Barranquitas, Corozal, Naranjito and Comerío. Adjuntas and Jayuya were part of the Porta Caribe region since the creation of that zone but was moved to the Porta Cordillera region. By the time the region was created in July 2012, the Puerto Rico Tourism Company already endorsed 136 rooms in lodgings located in Adjuntas, Cidra, Jayuya and Utuado.

Before the establishment of this tourism region, the central mountains of Puerto Rico had attracted numerous of visitors since the establishments of paradores, such as Villa Sotomayor in Adjuntas. The establishment of the Ruta Panorámica scenic route in the 1970s further popularized the region as a tourist destination by providing easier access to the mountain towns and scenic vistas of the Cordillera Central.

== Attractions ==
=== Ecotourism ===
- Bosque del Pueblo
- Camuy River Caves Park (partial)
- El Rabanal Conservation Easement
- Foreman Conservation Easement
- Aguas Buenas Cave and Caverns System Nature Reserve
- Cialitos River Nature Reserve
- Las Cabachuelas Caves Nature Reserve
- Planadas-Yeyesa Nature Reserve
- Hacienda Pellejas Protected Natural Area
- La Robleda Protected Natural Area
- Las Bocas Canyon Protected Natural Area
- San Cristóbal Canyon Protected Natural Area
- Sana Muerto River Protected Natural Area
- Toro Negro River Protected Natural Area
- Carite State Forest (partial)
- Guilarte State Forest (partial)
- Los Tres Picachos State Forest
- Monte Choca State Forest
- Río Abajo State Forest (partial)
- Toro Negro State Forest (partial)

=== Events ===
- Aibonito Festival of Flowers

=== Heritage tourism ===
==== Agriturism ====
- Hacienda Carvajal
- Hacienda Los Torres
- Hacienda Negrón
- Hacienda San Pedro
- Hacienda Tres Angeles

==== Archaeological sites ====
- Bateyes de Viví
- Caguana Ceremonial Indigenous Heritage Park
- Callejones Site
- Cueva La Espiral
- Cueva La Mora
- La Piedra Escrita

==== Culinary tourism ====
- Heladería de Lares
- Lechón in Guavate
- Longaniza in Orocovis

==== Cultural and historical landmarks ====
- Asomante Trench
- Carretera Central
- Castillo El Cortijo
- Jesús Izcoa Moure Bridge (partial)
- La Piedra de Degetau
- Lares and sites associated with the Grito de Lares
- Manatí Bridge at Mata de Plátano
- Mavilla Bridge
- Muñoz Rivera Family Mausoleum

==== Museums ====
- Casa Pueblo
- Coffee Museum Ciales
- El Cemí Museum
- Federico Degetau House Museum
- Juan Antonio Corretjer House Museum
- Luis Muñoz Rivera Birthplace Museum
- Nemesio Canales House Museum

==== Religious Tourism ====
- Church of Nuestra Señora de la Asunción of Cayey
- Church of San José of Aibonito
- Church San Miguel Arcángel of Utuado

=== Swimming ===
- Cañón Blanco in Utuado
- Charco Ataúd and Charco Mangó in Adjuntas

=== Theme parks and recreation areas ===
- Caonillas Lake
- Damián and Doña Juana Recreation Areas
- Dos Bocas Lake (partial)
- Historical Center of Cibuco
- Toro Verde Nature Adventure Park

=== Tourist routes ===
The Luis Muñoz Marín Panoramic Route (Ruta Panorámica Luis Muñoz Marín), or simply known as Ruta Panorámica, is a scenic route and heritage trail that crosses Porta Cordillera from east to west. The route, consisting of a network of at least 40 secondary roads, traverses the entirety of Puerto Rico from east (Maunabo) to west (Mayagüez) and provides access to a number of tourist attractions located throughout Porta Cordillera such as Toro Negro State Forest.

The Pork Highway (Ruta del Lechón) is an unofficial culinary-themed route consisting of a stretch of Puerto Rico Highway 184 that traverses the Guavate barrio of Cayey. The route is so called for its numerous restaurants and bars serving lechón asado, a pork dish consisting of crispy yet tender suckling pig served with sides such as rice and beans that is considered the national dish of Puerto Rico. Although not an officially recognized route, it features prominently in tourism campaigns, many of which describe it as the best pork in the island. This route also provides access to the Carite State Forest.

== Transportation ==
Porta Cordillera is a very mountainous and rugged region and therefore it has no passenger airports. The closest passenger airport is the Mercedita International Airport (PSE) located in Ponce. The region is however well-connected by road as major routes such as PR-52, which connects San Juan to Ponce and provides access to Ruta Panorámica from Cayey.

== See also ==
- Porta Caribe
- Porta del Sol
