= Pink trumpet tree =

Pink trumpet tree is a common name for several plants and may refer to:

- Handroanthus impetiginosus, native to Central and South America
- Tabebuia heterophylla, native to the Caribbean
