= Montes Oscuros =

Mountain range in Puerto Rico

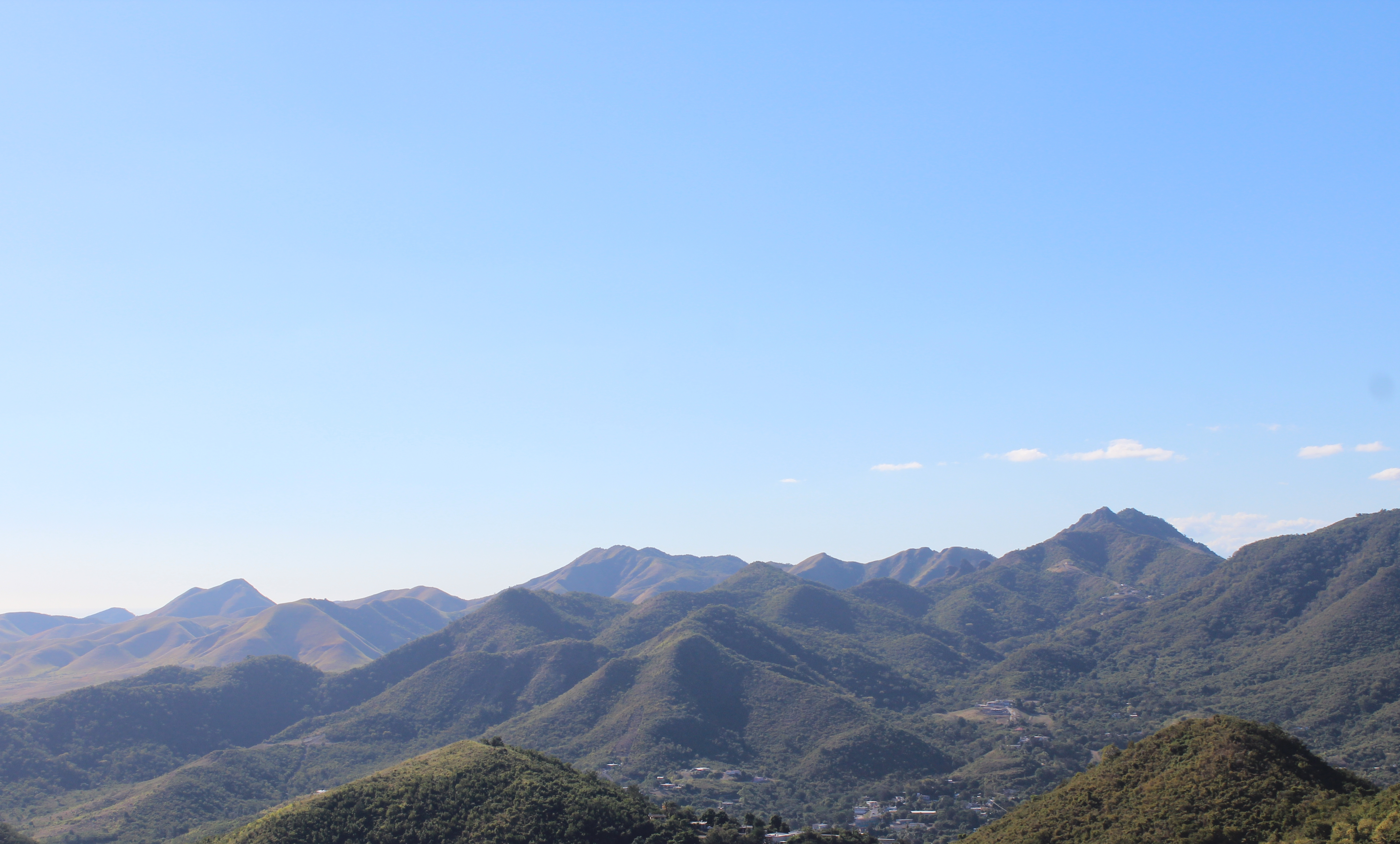
- Montes Oscuros from highway PR-52.

Highest point
- Peak: Piedras Chiquitas
- Elevation: 2,047 ft (624 m)
- Prominence: 617 ft (188 m)

Naming
- Etymology: "dark mountains" in Spanish

Geography
- Location: Coamo and Salinas
- Parent range: Sierra de Cayey

Montes Oscuros (Spanish for "dark mountains") is a small mountain range located between the Sierra de Cayey and the main Cordillera Central, on the municipalities of Coamo and Salinas in southern Puerto Rico. The mountain range and its environment are protected from urban development through a conservation easement (servidumbre de conservación), designated as the Montes Oscuros Scenic Easement (Spanish: Servidumbre Escénica Montes Oscuros).

The range rises to elevations of 2,047 feet (624 m) in elevation at Piedras Chiquitas, sometimes referred to as Los Farallones. Other mountain peaks of the range include Cerro Cariblanco, Cerro Pío Juan, Cerro Respaldo and Cerro Modesto.

== See also ==
- Protected areas of Puerto Rico
