= Sierra de Jájome =

Protected area of Puerto Rico

- Cerro de Jájome
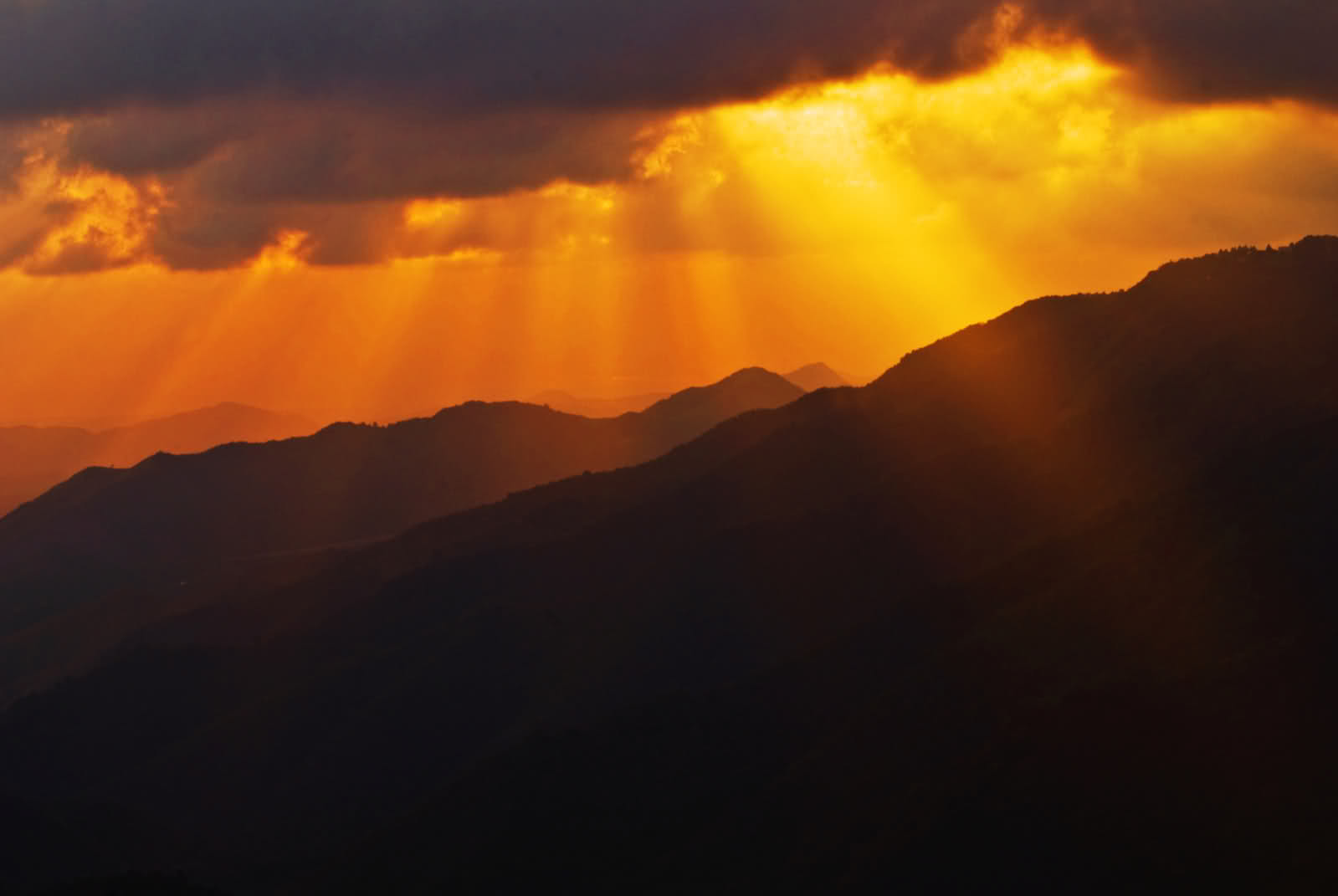

Highest point
- Elevation: 2,395 ft (730 m)

Geography
- Location: Cayey, Guayama and Salinas in Puerto Rico
- Parent range: Sierra de Cayey

Sierra de Jájome is a mountain massif of the Sierra de Cayey located in the municipalities of Cayey, Guayama and Salinas in southeastern Puerto Rico. The mountain, often referred to as a mountain range (sierra), is protected as the Jájome Protected Natural Area (Spanish: Área Natural Protegida de Jájome or Área Natural Protegida Finca Jájome). The Guayama Research Forest Area (Spanish: Bosque Experimental de Guayama) is also located on the massif. La Robleda, another protected natural area, is located nearby.

== Geography ==
Jájome is part of the Sierra de Cayey and is located in the barrios Jájome Alto and Jájome Bajo of Cayey, barrio Carmen in Guayama, and barrio Quebrada Yeguas in Salinas. The Jájome River has its source at the easternmost part of the Sierra de Jájome.

== Gallery ==
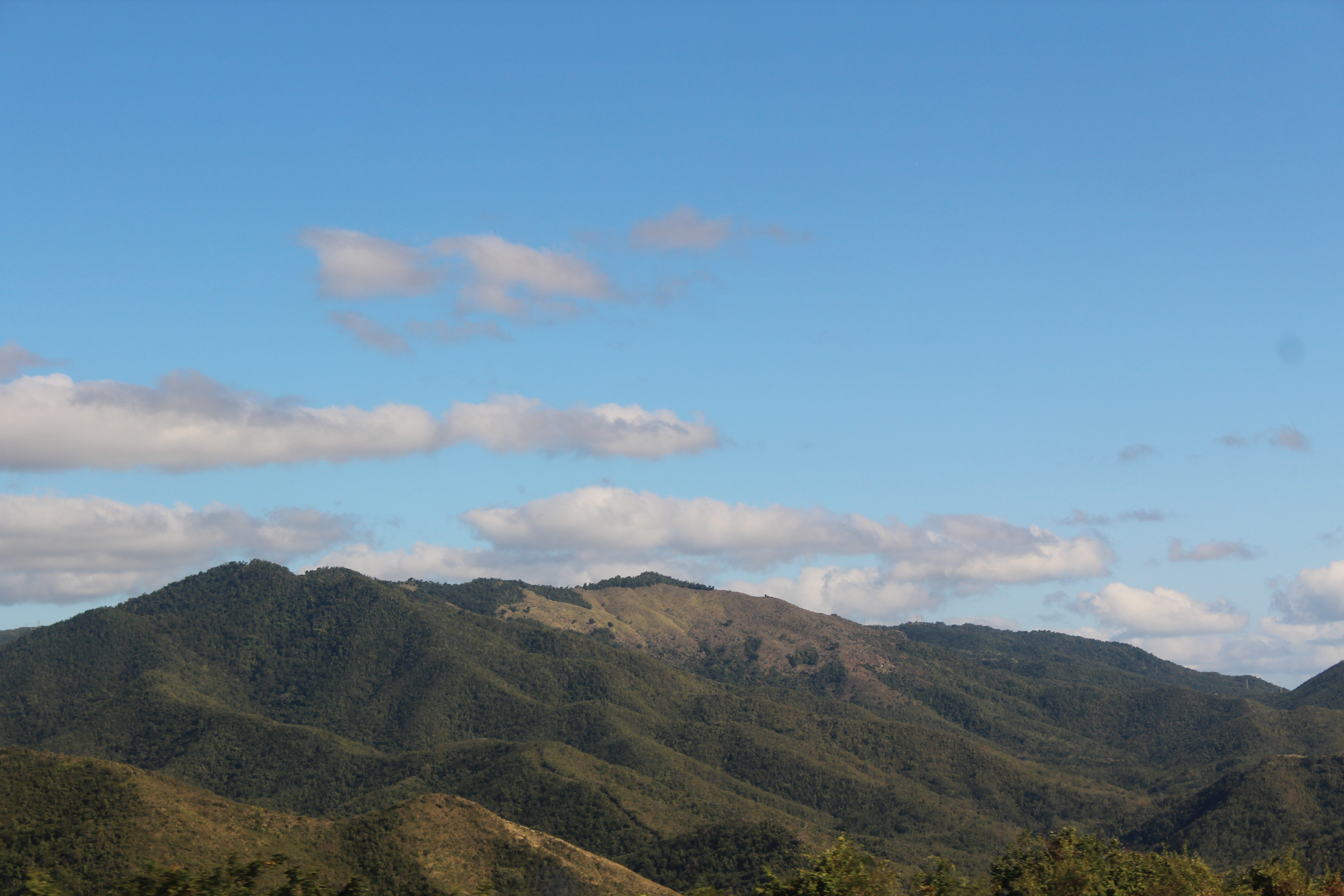
Cerro Jájome in the Guayama Research Area
