= Cibuco Swamp =

Protected area in Vega Baja, Puerto Rico

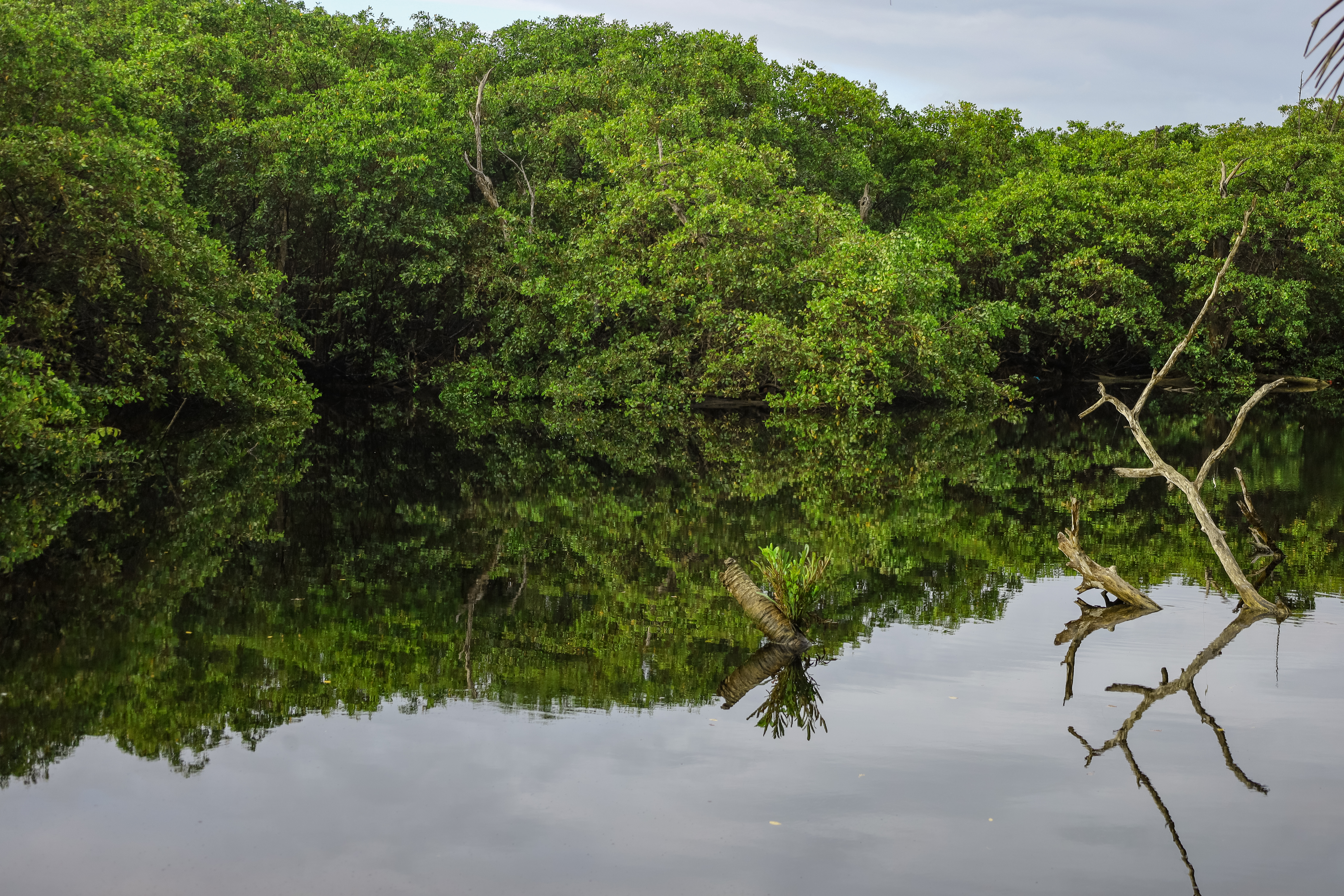
Cibuco Swamp near Caño Las Bocas

Cibuco Swamp (Spanish: Pantano de Cibuco) is a swamp located in northern Puerto Rico in the municipality of Vega Baja. The swamp is found at the mouth of the Cibuco River, in the barrios Cabo Caribe, Cibuco and Puerto Nuevo. The swamp is protected by the Puerto Rico Department of Natural and Environmental Resources (DRNA) as the Cibuco Swamp Nature Reserve (Reserva Natural Pantano de Cibuco), and it is home to a large number of species of plants and animals. The nature reserve is open to visitors who are allowed to hike and bike, and the area is also popular for birdwatching.

== See also ==
- Protected areas of Puerto Rico
