= Foreman Conservation Easement =

Protected natural area in Puerto Rico

The Foreman Conservation Easement (Spanish: Servidumbre de Conservación Foreman) is a protected natural area in the Cordillera Central (Central Mountain Range) of Puerto Rico, located in the municipality of Adjuntas. This protected area was the first conservation easement site (Spanish: servidumbre de conservación) to be established in the history of Puerto Rico; these are designated areas established through an agreement between a governmental body and private owners or entities to preserve natural areas from urban development.

The Foreman Conservation Easement was established in 1971 through an agreement between the Foreman family (Clark Foreman and Mairi Fraser Foreman) and the Conservation Trust of Puerto Rico (today known as the organization Para la Naturaleza) with the intention of protecting the source of the Portugués River and a habitat that is home to more than 155 species of plants and animals, some of which are considered endangered and/or endemic to Puerto Rico.

== See also ==
- Protected areas of Puerto Rico
