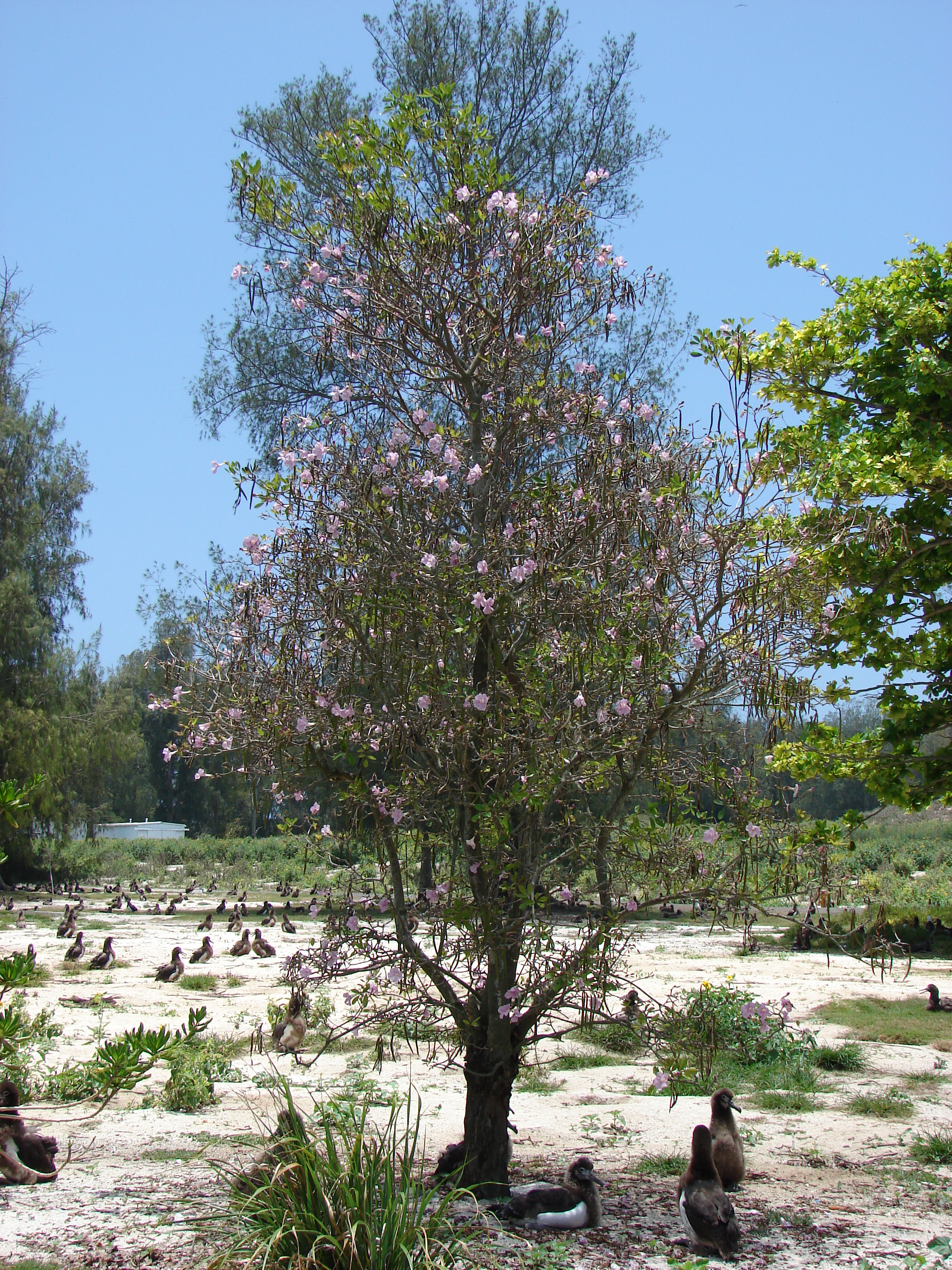

Conservation status
- Least Concern (IUCN 3.1)

Scientific classification
- Kingdom: Plantae
- Clade: Tracheophytes
- Clade: Angiosperms
- Clade: Eudicots
- Clade: Asterids
- Order: Lamiales
- Family: Bignoniaceae
- Genus: Tabebuia
- Species: T. heterophylla

Binomial name
- Tabebuia heterophylla (DC.) Britton

Synonyms
- Bignonia leucoxylon L.; Bignonia pentaphylla L. nom. illeg.; Handroanthus pentaphyllus Mattos nom. illeg.; Leucoxylon acuminata Raf.; Leucoxylon riparia Raf.; Pilocarpus heterophyllus (DC.) A. Gray; Raputia heterophylla DC.; Tabebuia arenicola Britton; Tabebuia beyeri Urb. & Ekman; Tabebuia brigandina Urb. & Ekman; Tabebuia camagueyensis Britton & P.Wilson; Tabebuia capotei Borhidi; Tabebuia curtissii (Britton) Britton; Tabebuia dictyophylla Urb.; Tabebuia geronensis Britton; Tabebuia gonavensis Urb.; Tabebuia leptopoda Urb.; Tabebuia lindahlii Urb. & Ekman; Tabebuia lucida Britton; Tabebuia pallida (Lindl.) Miers nom. inval.; Tabebuia pentaphylla Hemsl.; Tabebuia riparia (Raf.) Sandwith; Tabebuia triphylla DC.; Tecoma eggersii Kraenzl.; Tecoma pentaphylla (L.) A. DC.; Tecoma pentaphylla Juss. nom. illeg.; Tecoma triphylla Mart. ex DC. nom. inval.

= Tabebuia heterophylla =

Species of tree

Tabebuia heterophylla is a species of tree native to the Caribbean, and is also cultivated elsewhere. It is also known as roble blanco, pink manjack, pink trumpet tree, white cedar, and whitewood.

== Description ==
Tabebuia heterophylla grows up to 20 to 30 feet tall. Leaves are opposite and palmately compound with five or fewer leaflets. T. heterophylla is considered brevi decidius. Flowers are showy pink, tubular and five lobed (2 to 3 inches long). The flowering time is spring and summer. Its fruit is a seedpod, it splits along 2 lines to shed the numerous thin light brown seeds (1/2 to 1 inch long with 2 white wings).

=== Flower anatomy ===
The flowers of Tabebuia heterophylla are in an inflorescence of the umbellate type. It is a perfect and complete flower with radial (actinomorphic) symmetry, and the whorls of the corrolla and the calyx are connately joined. The ovary is superior with an axile placentation, two locules and two carpels.

== Distribution and habitat ==
The tree is native to the Caribbean, notably Puerto Rico and the Lesser Antilles. It is particularly common throughout Puerto Rico except in the higher elevations of the Sierra de Luquillo and the Cordillera Central. It can be found in high concentrations in the Sierra de Cayey and a protected area there, La Robleda, has recently become famous for its blooms which happen for a few weeks every year.

== Use ==
Pink manjack is used as a street tree. Its height allows for it to provide lasting shade and as a result it can provide shade for a residential property near the patio or deck. Its floral display allow it to be valued and as a result, it is known as an ornamental tree.

=== Wood ===
This tree is valuable for its timber production and grown for such purposes on plantations. It is commonly harvested from the wild for use locally and for export.

== Gallery ==
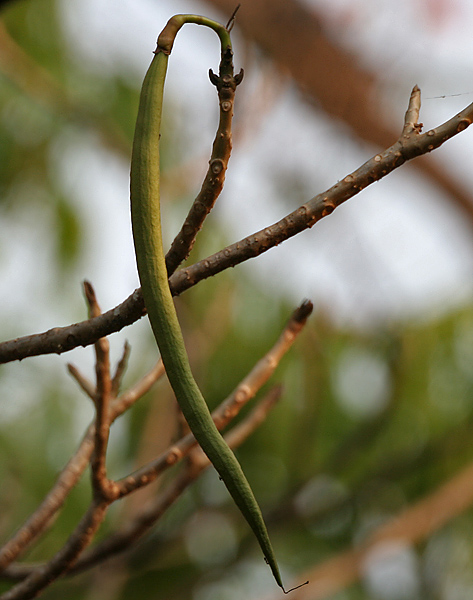
Fruit

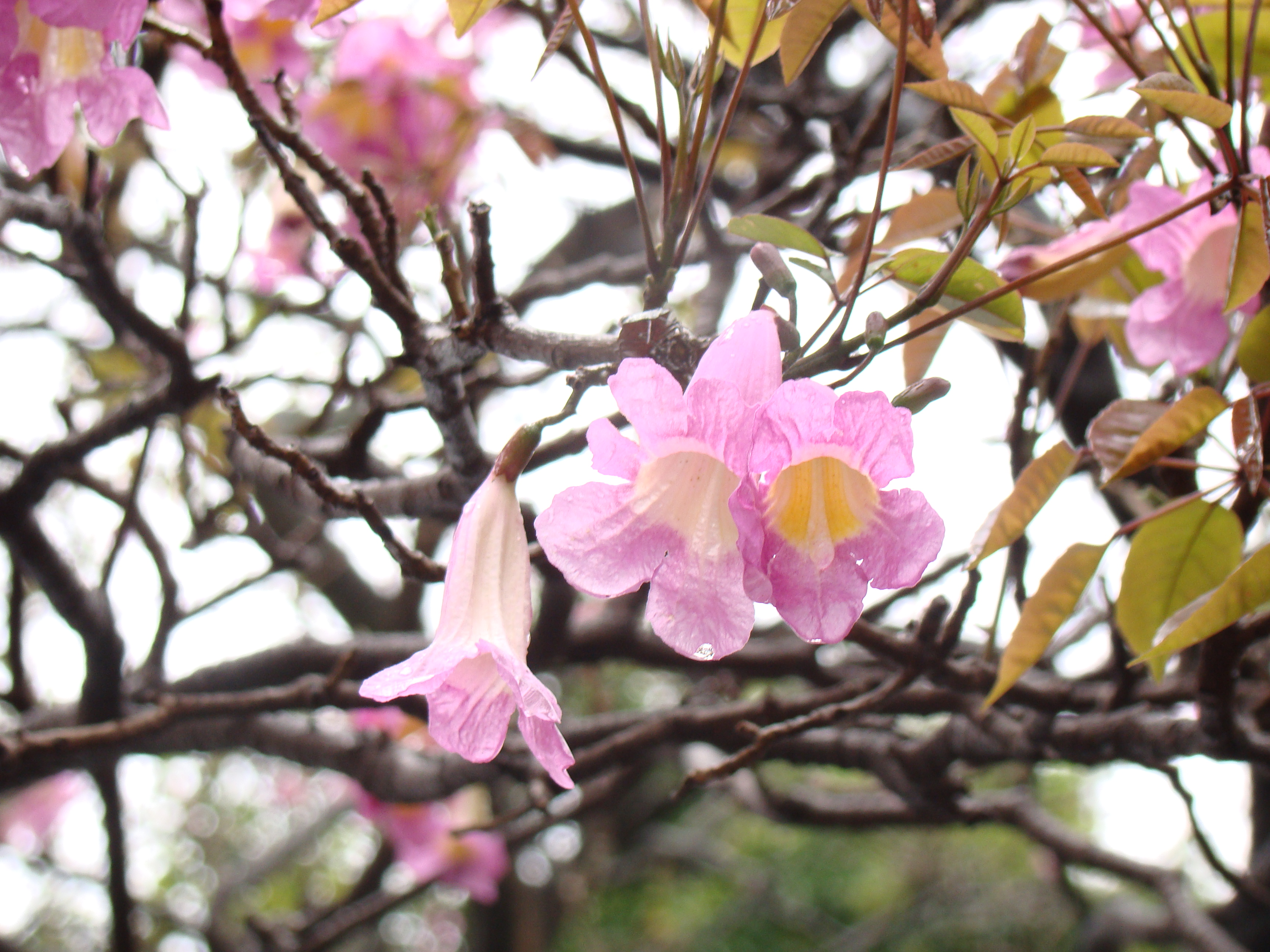
Flowers

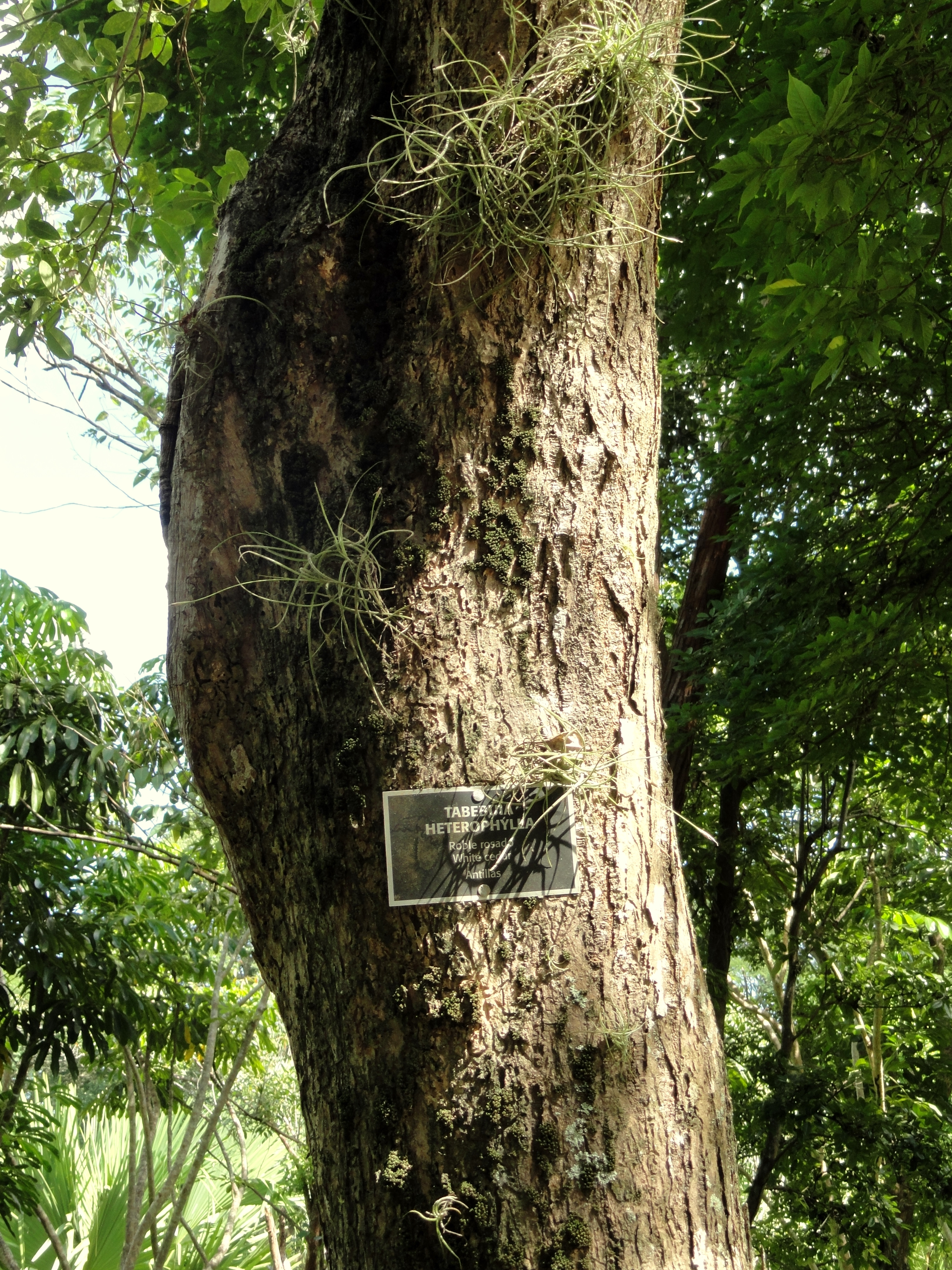
Bark

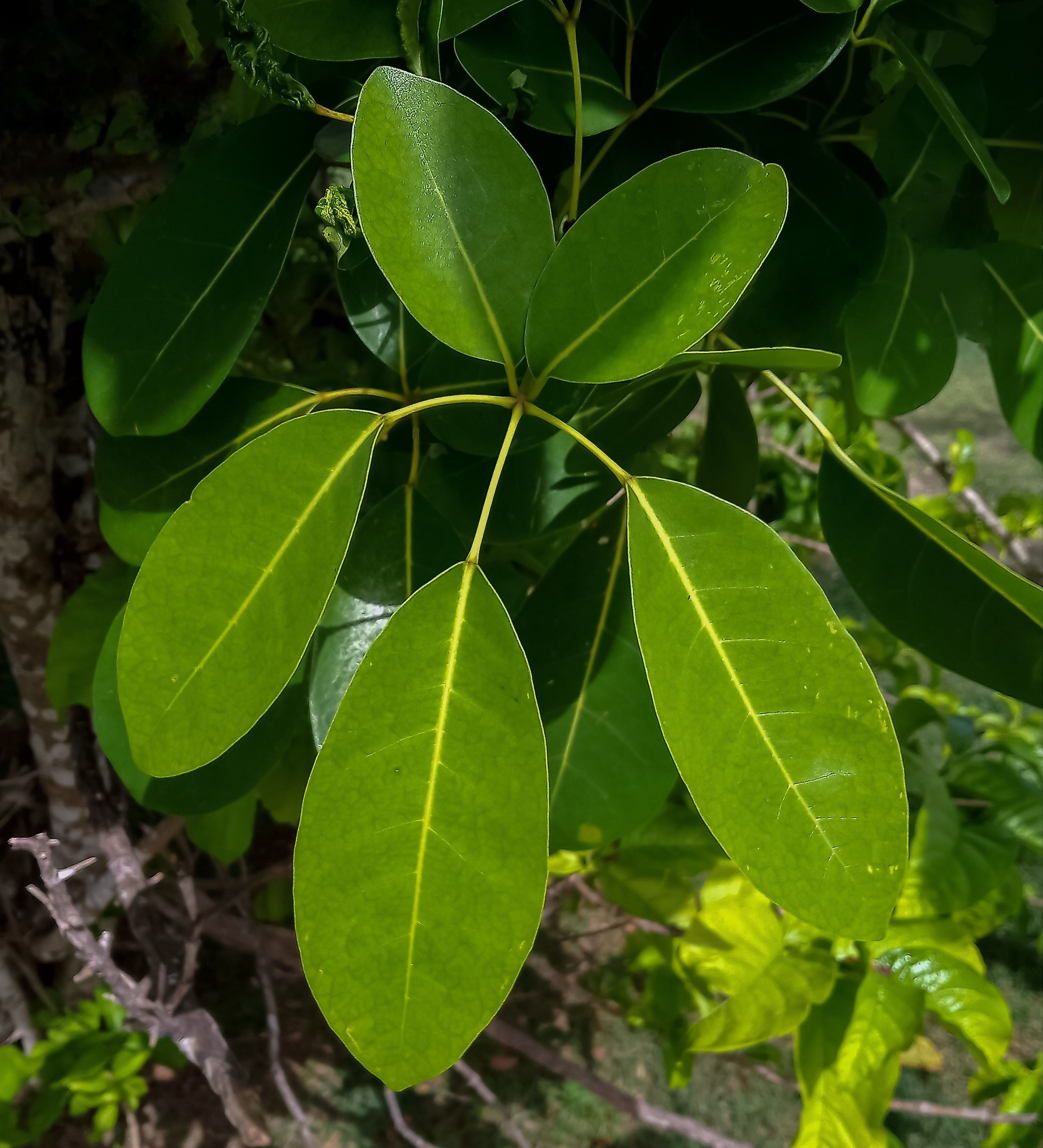
Leaves

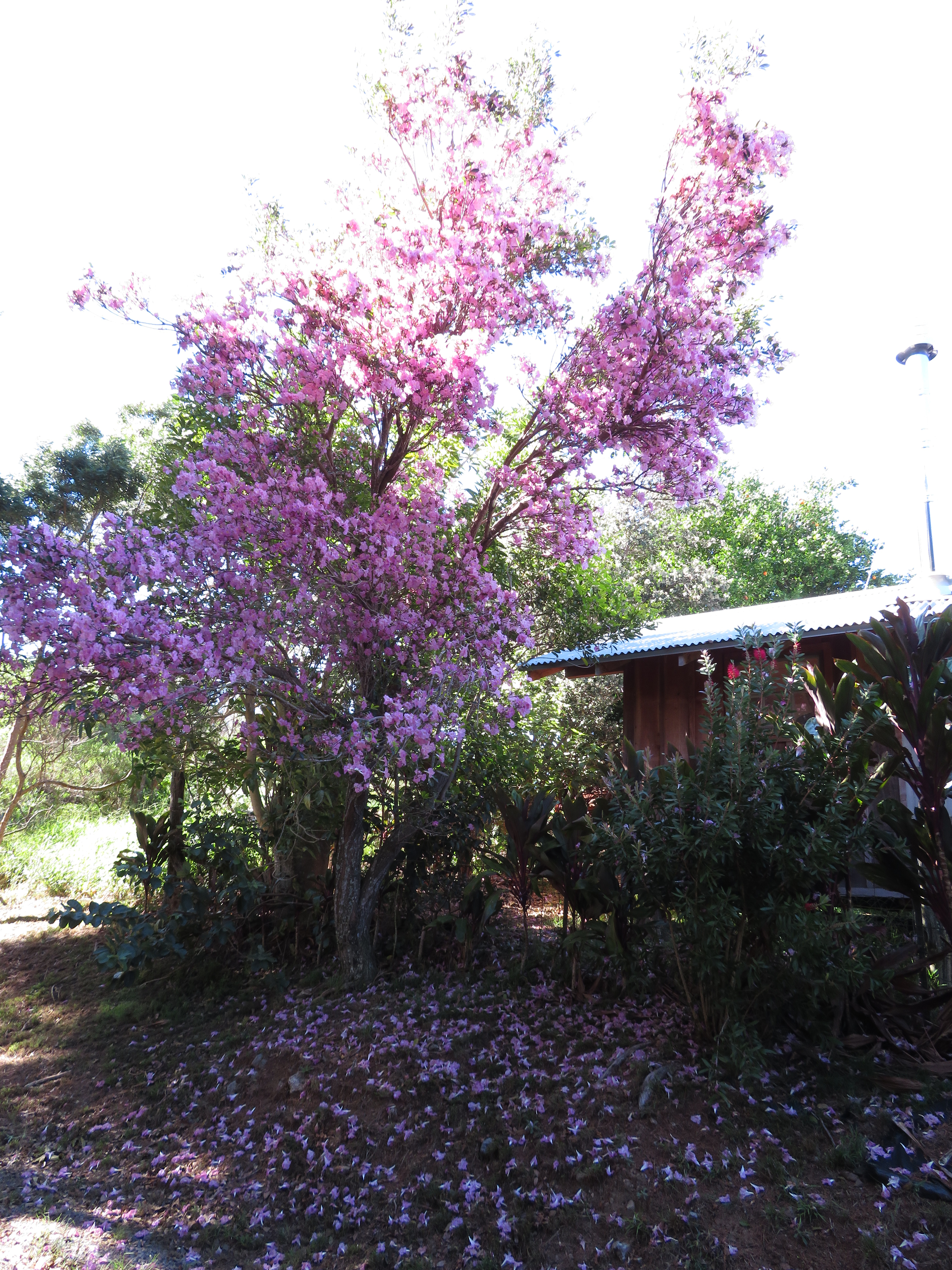
Ornamental use in Hawaii

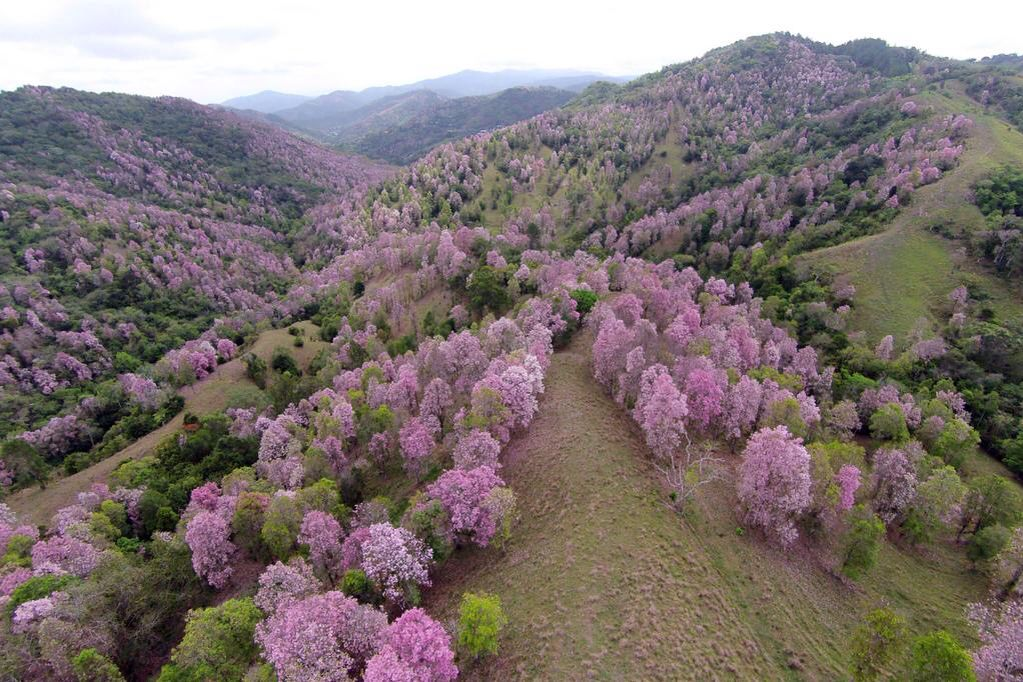
Full bloom in Puerto Rico
