= El Rabanal =

Protected area in Cidra, Puerto Rico

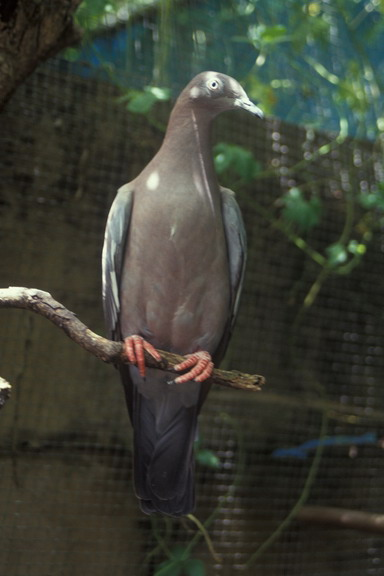
El Rabanal is an important nesting site for the Puerto Rican plain pigeon (paloma sabanera).

El Rabanal (Spanish: Servidumbre de Conservación El Rabanal) is a small, protected area consisting of 16 acres of critical secondary forest in the municipality of Cidra, Puerto Rico. The forest tract is located in barrio Rabanal, in a 5,438-acre hydrological basin (El Banco Creek, important for the La Plata basin) which is home to 21 species of birds, seven out of which are endemic to the region, including the Puerto Rican plain pigeon (considered a symbol of Cidra). This protected area was established through the Asociación de Pequeños Agricultores de Rabanal Inc. (APARI) and the Puerto Rico Conservation Trust (Para la Naturaleza) in 2002 with the goal of protecting the area from urban development and developing educational programs related to sustainable agriculture and environmental education.

== See also ==
- Protected areas of Puerto Rico
