= Hacienda Belvedere =

Former sugar plantation in Cabo Rojo, Puerto Rico

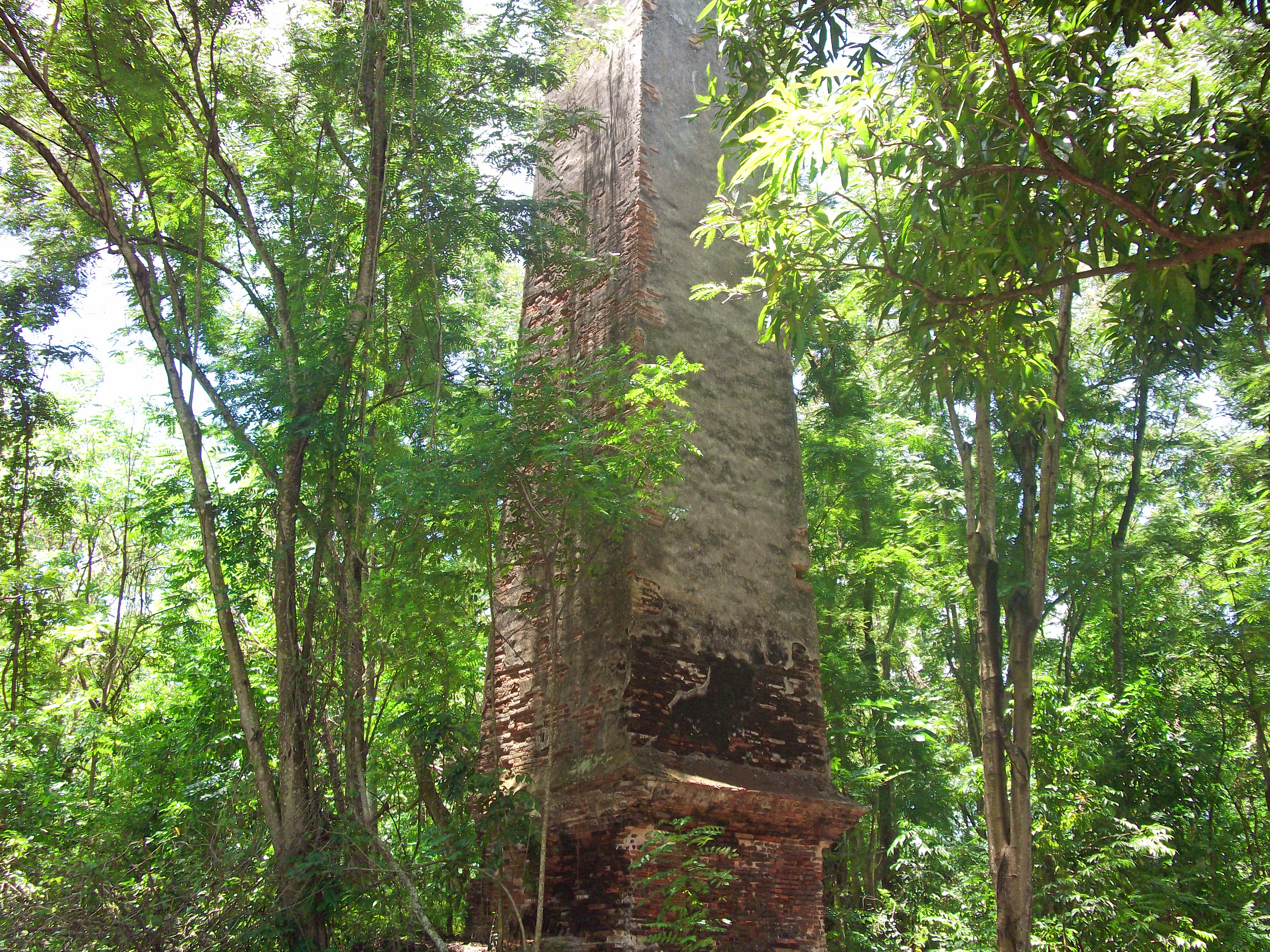
Hacienda Belvedere ruins.

Hacienda Belvedere, also known as Finca Belvedere (Belvedere Farm in English), is a former 1,649-acre plantation located in Miradero, in the municipality of Cabo Rojo, Puerto Rico. It was the second largest plantation in the region (after Hacienda La Monserrate in Boquerón). There are debating theories as to the foundation and development of Hacienda Belvedere: one proposed by writer Ferreras Pagán states that the plantation was founded by the Cabassa brothers in the late 19th century, while local sources claim that it was founded in the early 19th century by the Monagas family. There is however no conflicting history regarding the hacienda's development during the early 20th century, when the plantation was owned and operated by the Vidal family until 1922, when it was leased to Manuel de Santiago of Hacienda Borinquen.

Although the farm buildings no longer exist some of its infrastructure, including the sugar mill or trapiche and the chimney, still stand. The plantation area, now reforested, is protected by the Puerto Rico Department of Natural and Environmental Resources (DRNA) as the Belvedere Farm Nature Reserve (Spanish: Reserva Natural Finca Belvedere), as part of the Boquerón State Forest, one of the 20 units in the Puerto Rico state forests system.

== See also ==
- Boquerón State Forest
- Protected areas of Puerto Rico
