= La Robleda Natural Protected Area =

254-acre protected area in Cayey, Puerto Rico

Coordinates: 18.083°N 66.150°W

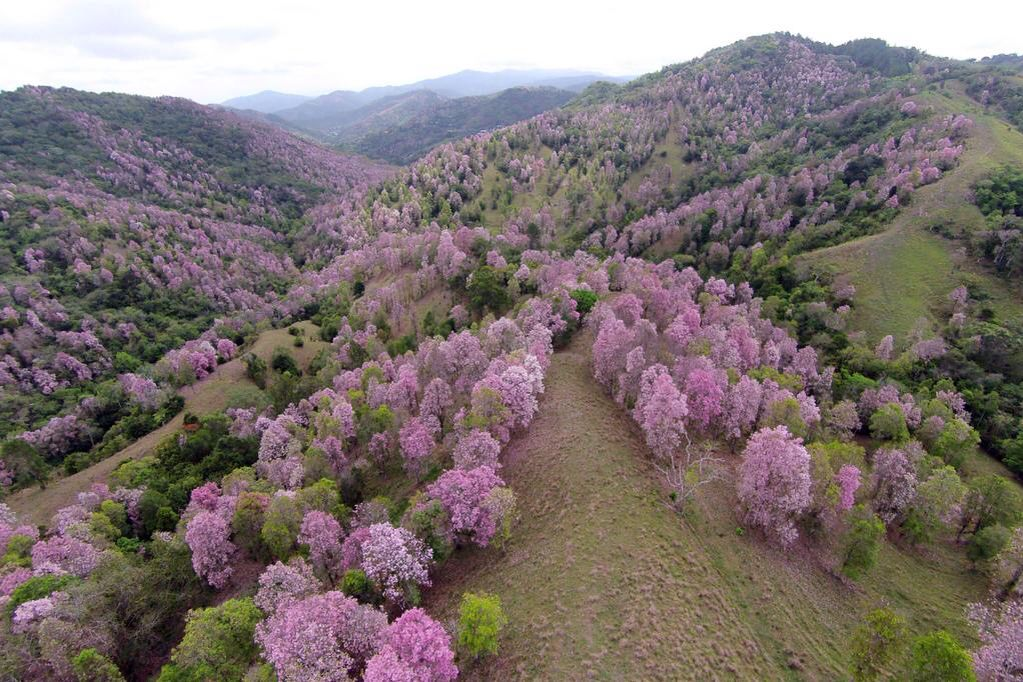
La Robleda in full bloom in 2016 Photo from the DRNA

La Robleda Natural Protected Area (Spanish: Área natural protegida La Robleda, or simply La Robleda) is a 254-acre (103 ha) protected natural area and conservation easement in Cayey, Puerto Rico. La Robleda, meaning 'the oak grove', gets its name from the high concentration of pink manjack (Tabebuia heterophylla) trees, locally known as roble blanco, in the area. The pink manjack trees in this nature reserve bloom for a few weeks every year, creating a natural scenic spectacle of pink and white colors in the Sierra de Cayey.

In addition to the pink manjack, the reserve also protects 89 species of plants, 34 species of birds, seven reptile, six amphibian and about 24 invertebrate species. Seven of these species are identified as critically endangered by the Puerto Rico Department of Natural and Environmental Resources (DRNA). Some of the key tree species found in the reserve are the ortegon (Coccoloba rugosa), the Sierra tulip tree (Daphnopsis phillipiana), the Caribbean guzmania (Guzmania berteroniana), and the rare and endangered Luquillo Mountain stopper or uvillo (Eugenia haematocarpa). The area is also a birdwatching site.

== See also ==
- Protected areas of Puerto Rico
- Tabebuia heterophylla
