= Mata de Plátano Field Station =

Field station and nature reserve in Puerto Rico

- Mata de Plátano Field Station and Nature Reserve
- IUCN category V (protected landscape/seascape)
- Location within Puerto Rico
- Location: Arecibo, Puerto Rico
- Coordinates: 18°24′51″N 66°43′42″W
- Area: 130 acres (53 ha)
- Governing body: Interamerican University of Puerto Rico, Bayamón Campus

The Mata de Plátano Field Station (Spanish: Estación de campo Mata de Plátano) is a research field station and nature reserve located in the barrios Dominguito and Tanamá of Arecibo, about an hour away from San Juan, in the heart of the Northern Karst region of Puerto Rico. The field station includes laboratory space and it is managed by the Interamerican University of Puerto Rico, particularly the Bayamón campus, but it is open to researchers of biology, ecology and other environmental sciences from a number in and out of state of academic institutions.

== Mata de Plátano Nature Reserve ==
The Mata de Plátano Nature Reserve covers an area of 130 acres and it protects undisturbed rainforest ecosystems typical of the karst regions of northern Puerto Rico. The geography is mostly hilly consisting of mogotes, sinkholes and caves, such as the Culebrones Cave. The latter is home to 13 species of bats, and one of its most notable features of interest is the ecological interactions between Puerto Rican boas (Chilabothrus inornatus) and bats.
