= Tourmaline Reef =

Shelf-edge reef

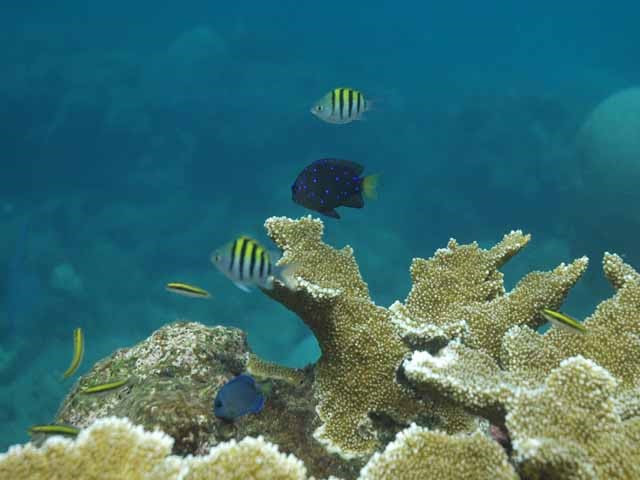
Fish and coral at Tourmaline Reef, 2022.

Tourmaline Reef (Spanish: Arrecife de Tourmaline) is a shelf-edge reef located in the Mona Passage off Mayagüez Bay in western Puerto Rico. The reef is one of the best-preserved reefs of its type in Puerto Rico as it is found far enough from the coast and was selected as one of the first coral reef protection zones under the Puerto Rico Coastal Zone Management Program (Programa de Manejo de la Zona Costanera de Puerto Rico). Tourmaline Reef is located close to Punta Guanajibo, at 7.5 nautical miles from Mayagüez, at depths of up to 10 meters under the ocean surface bordering in waters of moderate to high visibility due to minimal terrigenous or sedimentary deposits.

== Conservation ==
The reef system is protected as the Tourmaline Reef Nature Reserve (Reserva Natural Arrecife de Tourmaline), managed by the Puerto Rico Department of Natural Resources (DRNA) which provides management plans and conservation resources that limit the fishing activities in the area for the purpose of preserving its delicate ecosystem, previously threatened by the overfishing of red grouper (Epinephelus guttatus). The reserve extends between the maritime borders of the municipalities of Mayagüez and Cabo Rojo. The coral cover of the reef is currently at approximately 40% in 2009, a decrease from 60% in 2003. In addition to the coral ecosystem, the reserve also protects tracts of seagrass prairies, important for species such as sea turtles and the West Indian manatee.
