= Sana Muerto River =

River of Puerto Rico

Coordinates: 18.2880089°N 66.4229484°W

Río Sana Muerto

Location
- Commonwealth: Puerto Rico
- Municipality: Morovis and Orocovis

The Río Sana Muerto is a river of Puerto Rico.

== See also ==
- List of rivers of Puerto Rico
