= Jacaboa River =

River of Puerto Rico

Coordinates: 17.9735783°N 65.9651630°W

- Native name: Río Jacaboa (Spanish)

Location
- Commonwealth: Puerto Rico
- Municipality: Patillas

The Jacaboa River (Spanish: Río Jacaboa) is a river of Patillas, Puerto Rico.

== See also ==
- List of rivers of Puerto Rico
