= Puerto Mosquito =

Bay in the island of Vieques, Puerto Rico

- Bahía Bioluminiscente de Vieques
- IUCN category V (protected landscape/seascape)
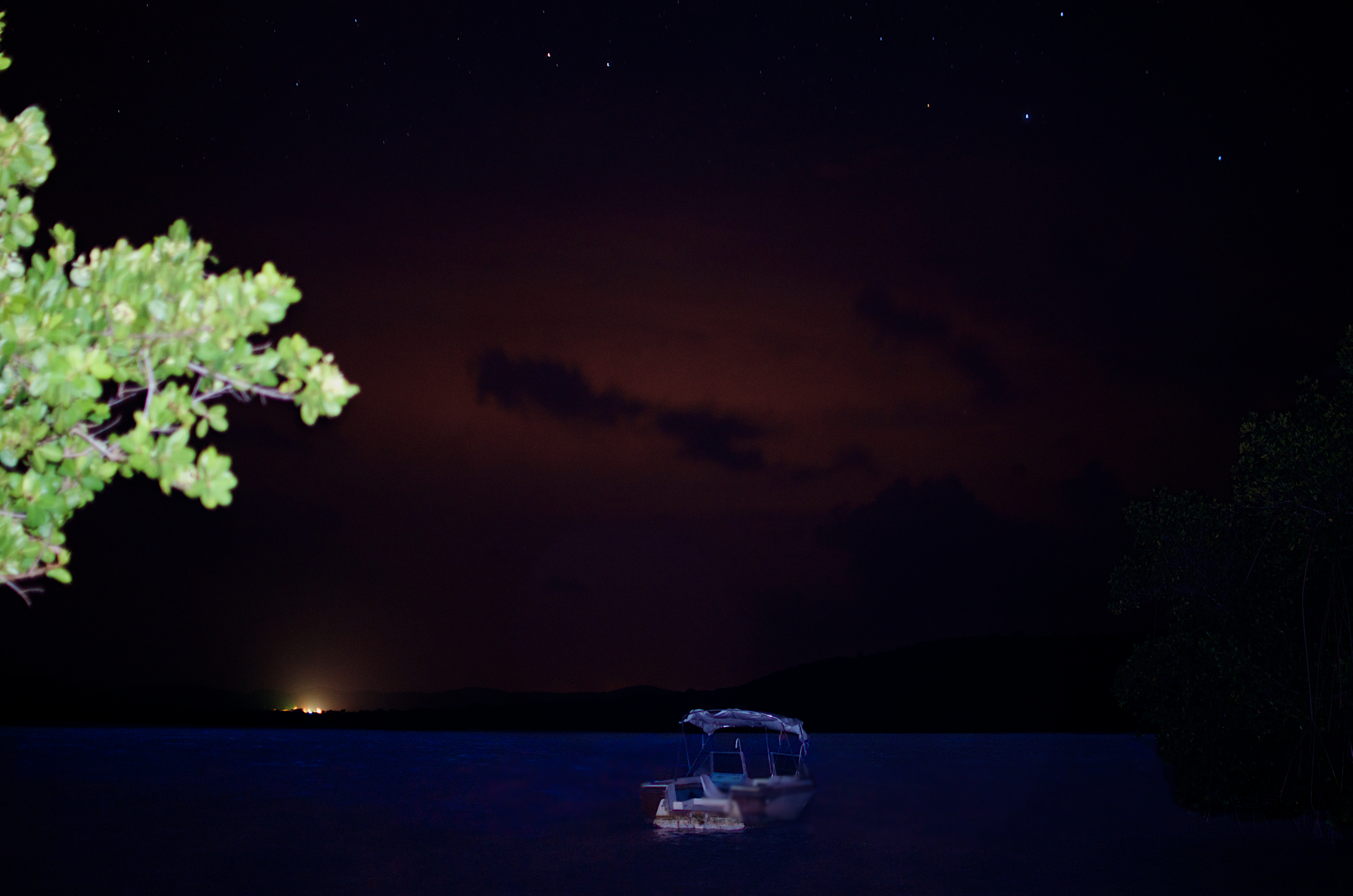
- Bioluminescent blue hues at Puerto Mosquito

- Location within Puerto Rico
- Location: Vieques, Puerto Rico
- Nearest city: Esperanza, Vieques
- Coordinates: 18°06′07″N 65°26′45″W

U.S. National Natural Landmark
- Designated: 1980

The Puerto Mosquito Bioluminescent Bay (Spanish: Bahía bioluminiscente de Puerto Mosquito), or Mosquito Bio Bay, is a bay in the island of Vieques famous for its bioluminescence produced by the dinoflagellate Pyrodinium bahamense, which glows blue when agitated. This species of phytoplankton is found in bays in the Virgin Islands, Puerto Rico and The Bahamas.

== History ==
According to legend, Puerto Mosquito is named after the Mosquito, the name of one of pirate Roberto Cofresí's ships. The bio bay was proclaimed a National Natural Landmark in 1980.

== Ecology ==
=== Bioluminescence ===
Bioluminescence is produced by the dinoflagellate Pyrodinium bahamense, which glows blue when agitated. Although the phytoplankton responsible for the phenomenon of bioluminescence is found throughout the Antilles, Puerto Mosquito is one of the seven year-round bioluminescent bays in the Caribbean. The bioluminescence is the product of a number of factors: the water conditions and ecosystem created by the surrounding mangrove forest (mostly Rhizophora mangle), the complete lack of modern development in the lagoon, the temperature of the water and the depth of the bay.

=== Flora and fauna ===
Although famous for the red mangrove (Rhizophora mangle), critical in the bioluminescence process of the bay, the reserve is home to all four occurring mangrove species in the archipelago of Puerto Rico: the other three being black (Avicennia germinans), white (Laguncularia racemosa), and buttonwood or button mangrove (Conocarpus erectus).

The reserve, along with the Vieques National Wildlife Refuge, is an internationally recognized Important Bird Area (IBA) and a designated Important Shorebird Site. Some notable bird species found within the reserve include Adelaide's warblers (Setophaga adelaidae), mangrove cuckoos (Coccyzus minor), crested hummingbirds (Orthorhyncus cristatus), snowy egrets (Egretta thula), brown boobies (Sula leucogaster), magnificent frigatebirds (Fregata magnificens), royal terns (Thalasseus maximus) and black-bellied plovers (Pluvialis squatarola), and migratory birds such as semipalmated plovers (Charadrius semipalmatus) and ospreys (Pandion haliaetus).

== Recreation ==
The bright blue hues produced by the microorganisms during nights of very little moonlight or new moon attracts tourists to the bio bay. It is one of the three bio bays in Puerto Rico; the other two are Laguna Grande in Fajardo and La Parguera in Lajas. The bay and its surrounding mangrove forest are protected by the Vieques Bioluminescent Bay Natural Reserve and no swimming is allowed. Guided tours allow visitors to kayak in the bay and observe the bioluminescence. The bio bay is located near the beach community of Esperanza, between the barrios of Puerto Ferro and Puerto Real in Vieques, Puerto Rico.

== Gallery ==
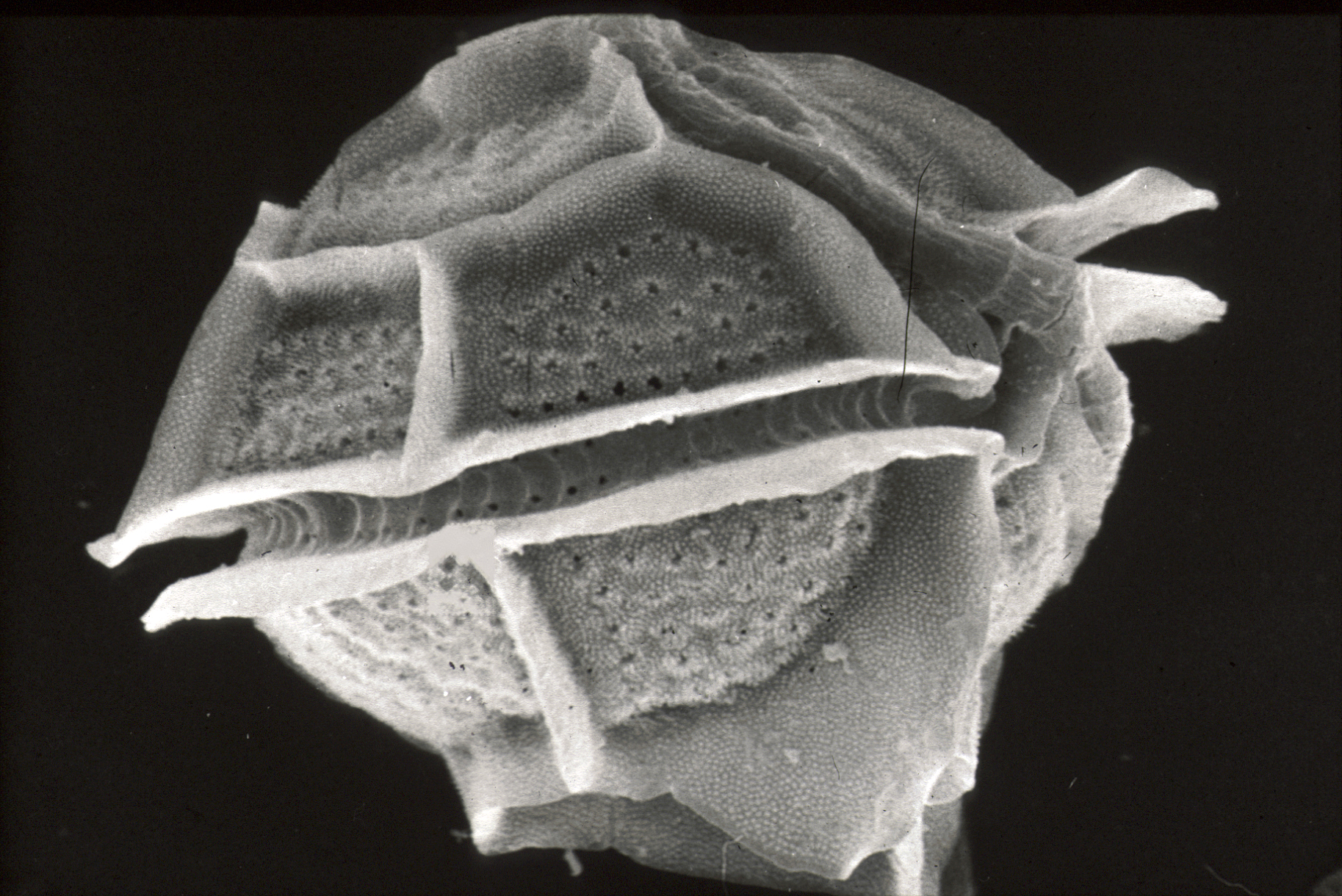
Pyrodinium bahamense is responsible for the bioluminescence.

Kayaking tour in the Puerto Mosquito Bio Bay

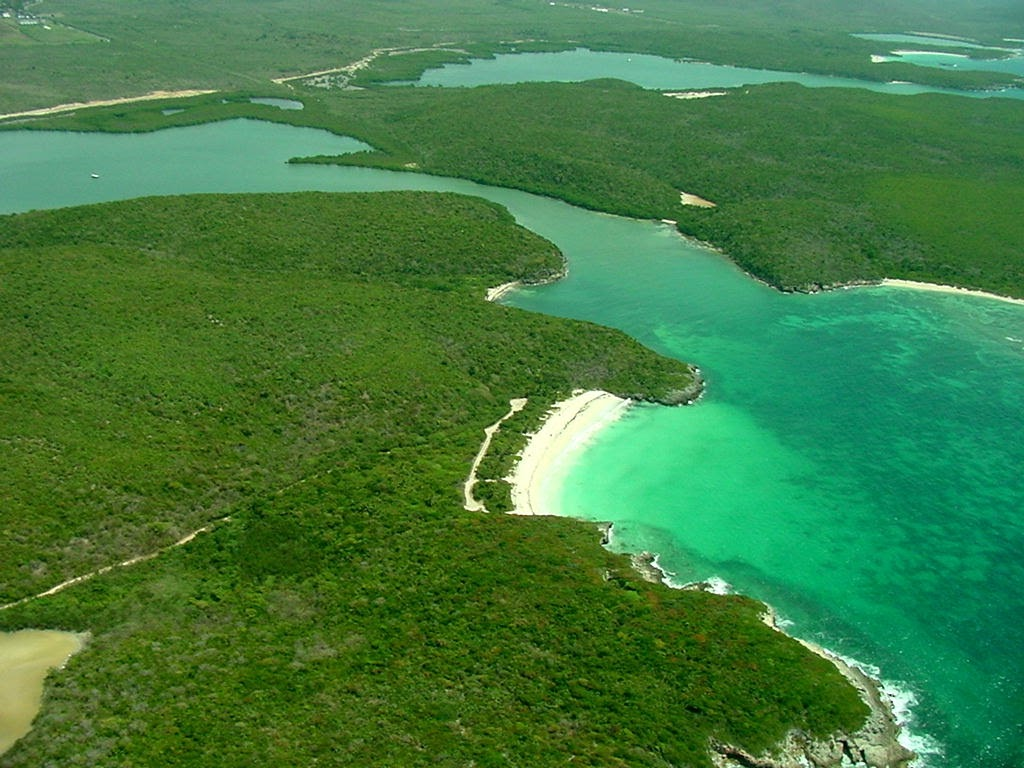
Aerial view of the bay and nature reserve.

== See also ==
- La Parguera Nature Reserve
- List of National Natural Landmarks in Puerto Rico
