= San Juan Ecological Corridor =

Ecological project in Puerto Rico

- IUCN category V (protected landscape/seascape)
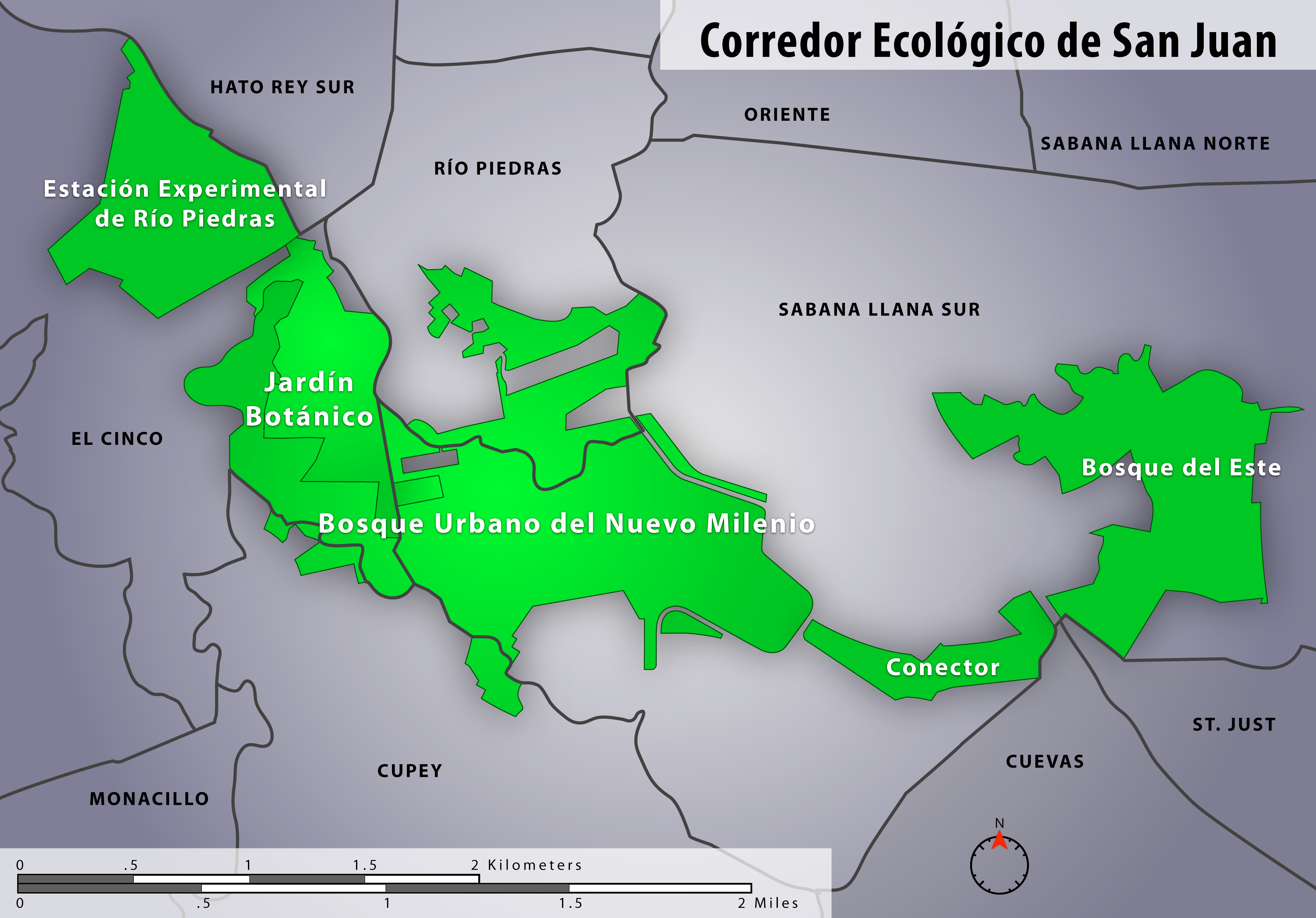
- Location of constituents of the CESJ within the municipality of San Juan.
- Interactive map of San Juan Ecological Corridor
- Location: San Juan, Puerto Rico
- Nearest city: Río Piedras
- Area: 971 acres (3.93 km^{2})
- Established: 2003
- Governing body: Commonwealth of Puerto Rico

The San Juan Ecological Corridor (Spanish: Corredor Ecológico de San Juan, shortened to CESJ) is a project dedicated to the preservation of an ecological corridor in the municipality of San Juan, Puerto Rico, designated under Law No. 206 on August 28, 2003.

== Overview ==
The San Juan Ecological Corridor constitutes approximately 1,000 cuerdas (971 acres) of secondary forests, protected natural zones and green spaces within the municipality of San Juan, particularly throughout the barrios (districts) of El Cinco, Cupey, Río Piedras (Pueblo) and Sabana Llana Sur, and it includes the University of Puerto Rico Botanical Garden and Research Station. The geography consists of karst hills, highlands, valleys and plains with elevations ranging from 32 feet (10 m) to 377 feet (115 m) above sea level. This ecological corridor is important for the protection of the Piedras River hydrographic basin and the San Juan Estuary drainage ecosystems.

== Constituents ==
The following protected areas are included in the San Juan Ecological Corridor:

- Cupey Arboretum
- Doña Inés Mendoza Urban Forest
- Los Capuchinos Forest
- New Millennium State Forest
- Old Piedras River Aqueduct
- University of Puerto Rico Botanical Garden

== See also ==
- Protected areas of Puerto Rico
