= El Cinco, San Juan, Puerto Rico =

Barrio of Puerto Rico

El Cinco
- Barrio
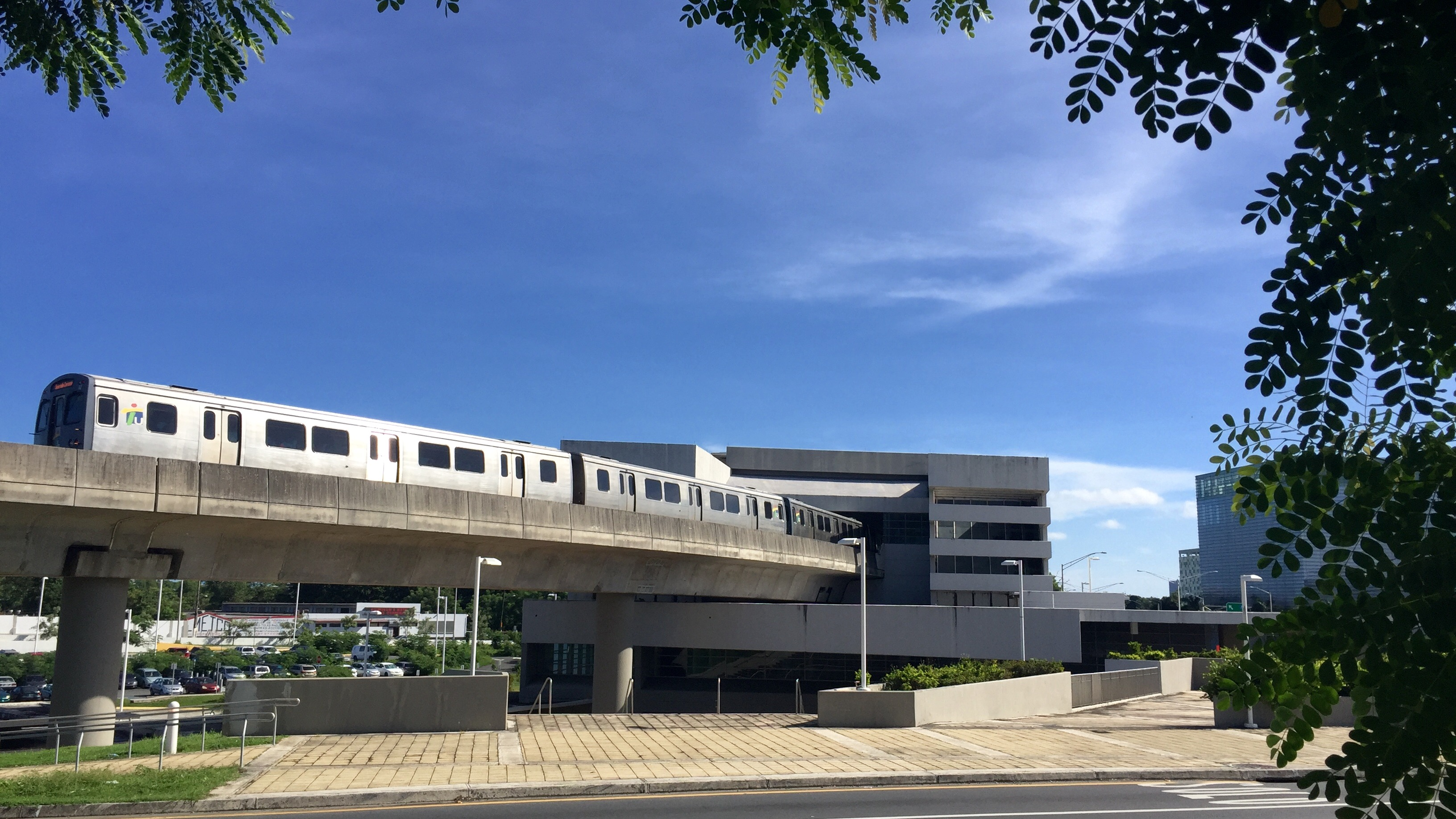
- Tren Urbano in El Cinco

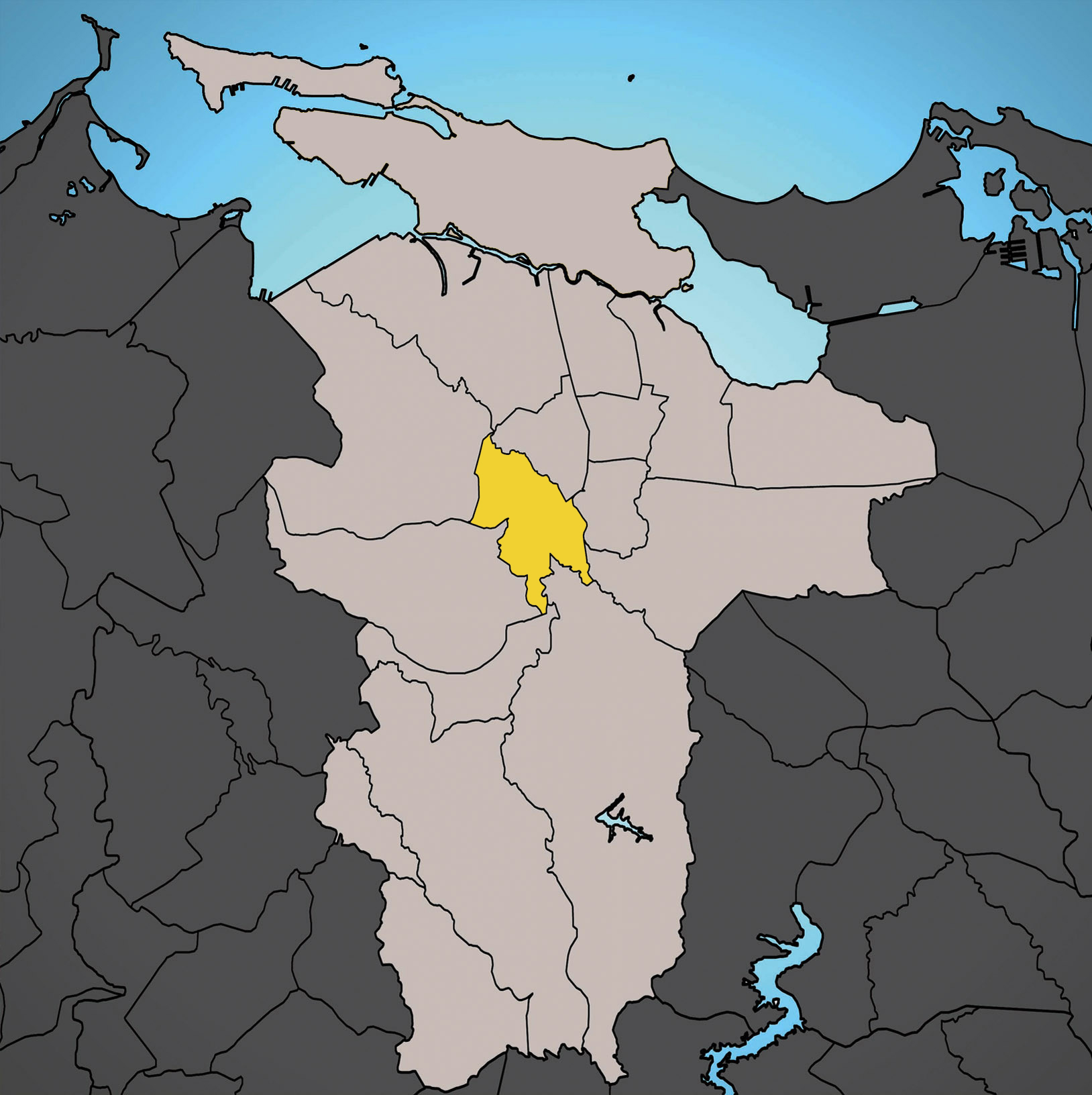
- Location of El Cinco shown in yellow
- Coordinates: 18°23′29″N 66°03′45″W
- Commonwealth: Puerto Rico
- Municipality: San Juan

Area
  - Total: 1.35 sq mi (3.5 km^{2})
  - Land: 1.34 sq mi (3.5 km^{2})
  - Water: 0.01 sq mi (0.026 km^{2})
- Elevation: 66 ft (20 m)

Population (2020)
  - Total: 6,138
  - Density: 4,580/sq mi (1,770/km^{2})
- 2020 census

El Cinco is one of the 18 barrios of the municipality of San Juan, Puerto Rico and a former barrio of the dissolved municipality of Río Piedras. As of the 2020 United States Census, it had a population of 6,138 and a land area of 1.34 square miles (3.5 km^{2}) resulting in a population density of 4,625.4/sq mi (1,785.9/km2).

== Geography ==
Historical population
Census	Pop.	Note	%±
1950	2,330		—
1960	6,535		180.5%
1970	8,132		24.4%
1980	8,043		−1.1%
1990	8,426		4.8%
2000	7,149		−15.2%
2010	6,198		−13.3%
2020	6,138		−1.0%
U.S. Decennial Census; 1900 (N/A) 1910-1930; 1930-1950 1980-2000 2010 2020

El Cinco is surrounded by seven barrios: Gobernador Piñero, Monacillo Urbano, Monacillo, Cupey, Sabana Llana Sur, Río Piedras (pueblo) and Hato Rey Sur.

== Landmarks and historic sites ==
This barrio is home to numerous sites listed in the US National Register of Historic Places. The historic Río Piedras Aqueduct, also known as the San Juan Historic Aqueduct, is an old aqueduct and water filtration plant that dates from 1846. The site has been listed in the National Register of Historic Places since 2007. Other historic sites located in El Cinco are the Río Piedras Bridge, shared with Hato Rey Sur and dating from 1853, the Rum Pilot Plant located University of Puerto Rico Experimental Agricultural Station, and the San Juan Botanical Garden is located nearby too.

== Transportation ==
The area is served by the Tren Urbano metro system with the elevated Cupey station located on the intersection of highways PR-1 and PR-176 in El Cinco. Despite the name of the station, it is not located in the barrio of Cupey, although it is indeed located nearby.

== Gallery ==
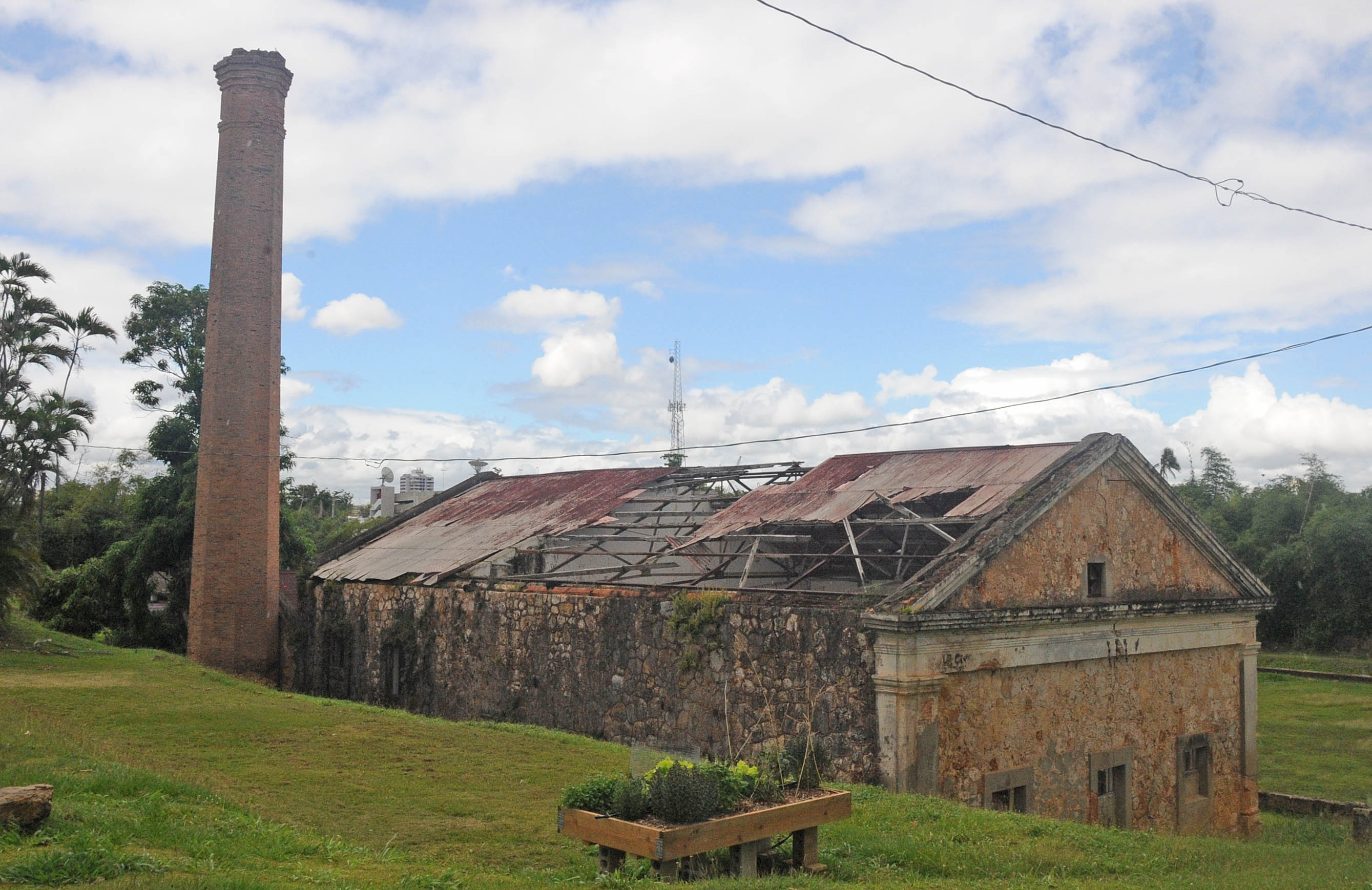
Ruins of the historic aqueduct of Río Piedras

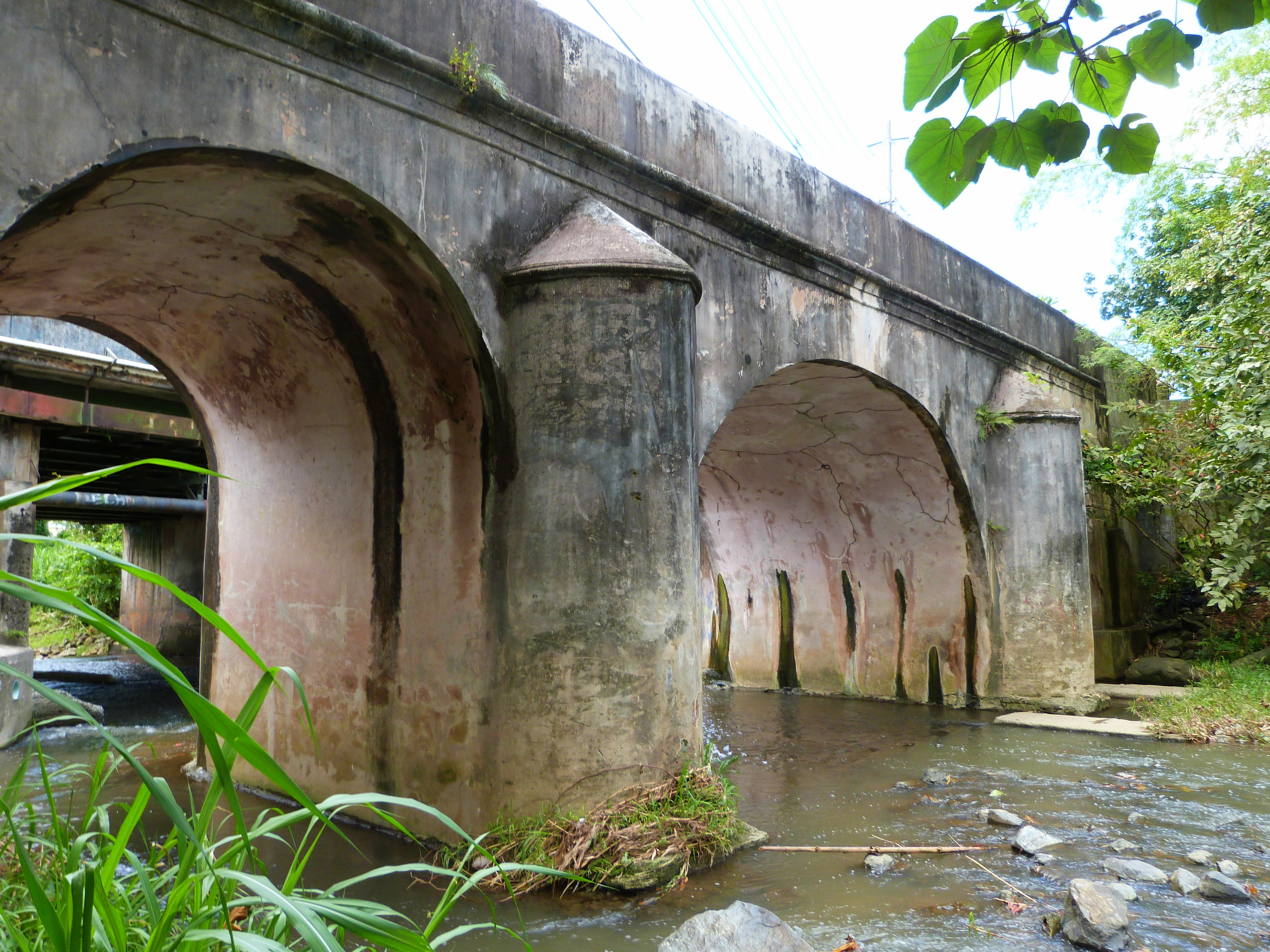
Historic Río Piedras Bridge

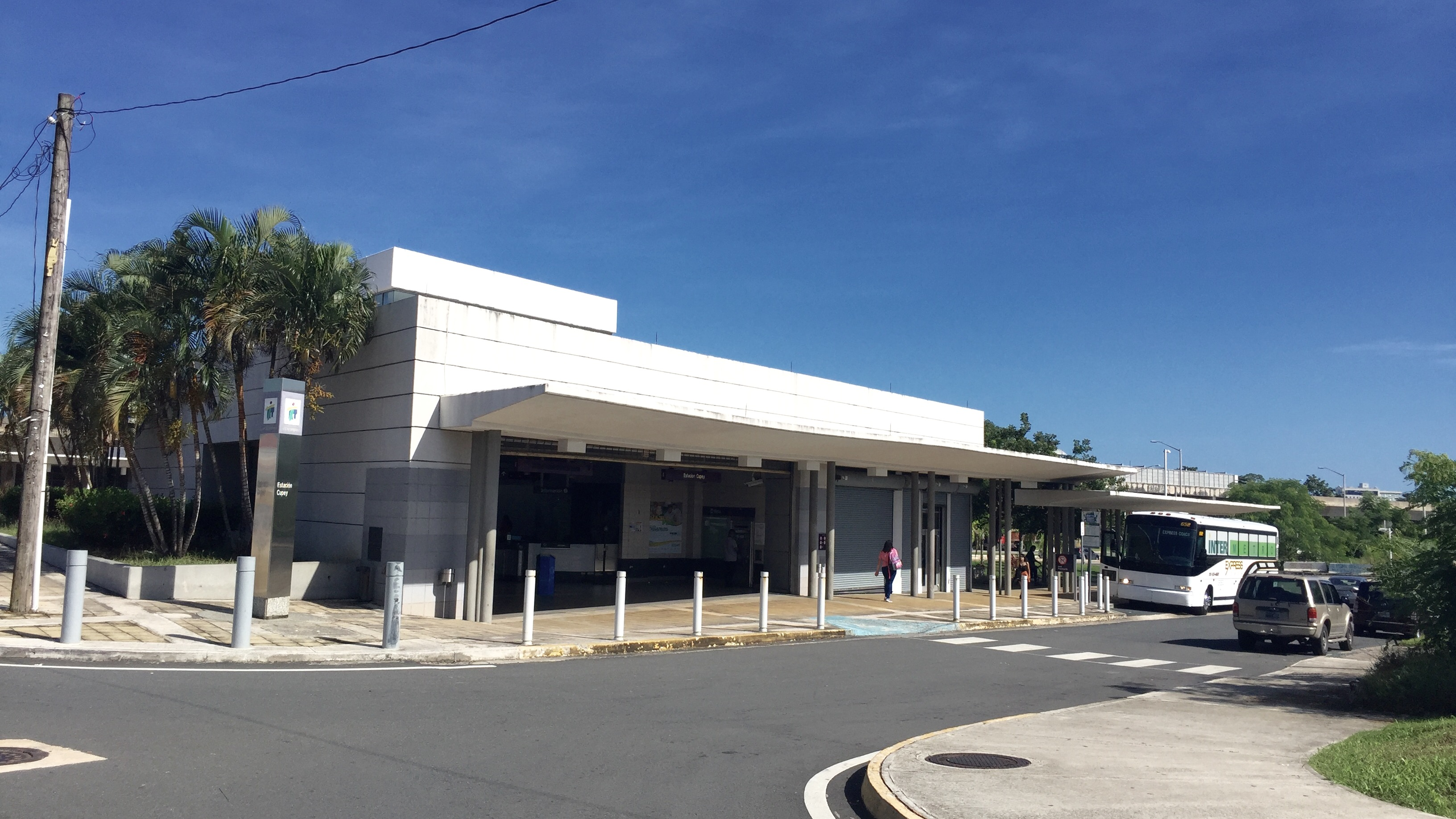
Cupey Station entrance

== See also ==
- List of communities in Puerto Rico
