= Río Piedras Bridge =

- Rio Piedras Bridge
- U.S. National Register of Historic Places
- U.S. Historic district – Contributing property
- Puerto Rico Historic Sites and Zones
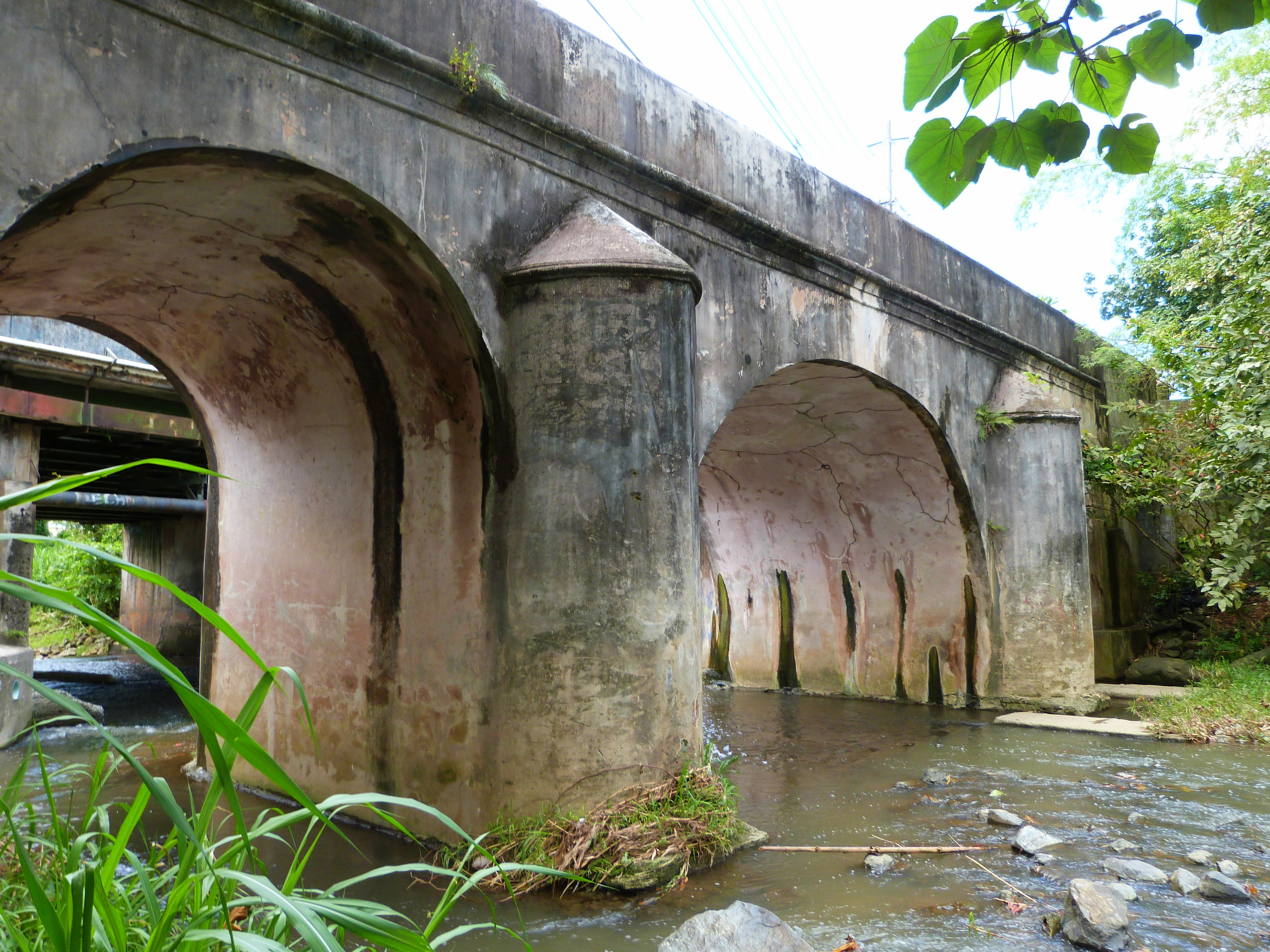
- Rio Piedras Bridge in 2017.

- Location within Puerto Rico
- Location: Highway 8839, km 12.5 San Juan, Puerto Rico
- Coordinates: 18°23′40″N 66°03′21″W
- Built: 1853
- Part of: Acueducto de San Juan Historic District (ID07000585)
- MPS: Historic Bridges of Puerto Rico MPS
- NRHP reference No.: 95000832
- RNSZH No.: 2000-(RMSJ)-00-JP-SH

Significant dates
- Added to NRHP: July 19, 1995
- Designated RNSZH: February 3, 2000

The Río Piedras Bridge (Spanish: Puente de Río Piedras) or Piedras River Bridge (Puente del Río Piedras), also designated as Bridge #3, is a historic 19th-century barrel vault bridge located in the former town of Río Piedras, today part of the city of San Juan, Puerto Rico, that spans across the Piedras River. The bridge was built in 1853 as part of the development of the Carretera Central that linked San Juan to Ponce, making it the oldest still-existing bridge of said route. Today the bridge is still stable and usable, and it can be found near the entrance of the University of Puerto Rico Botanical Garden. It was added to the National Register of Historic Places in 1995 and on the Puerto Rico Register of Historic Sites and Zones in 2000, and it is considered to be the best-preserved example of a Spanish masonry arch bridge anywhere in Puerto Rico and the United States.

== Gallery ==
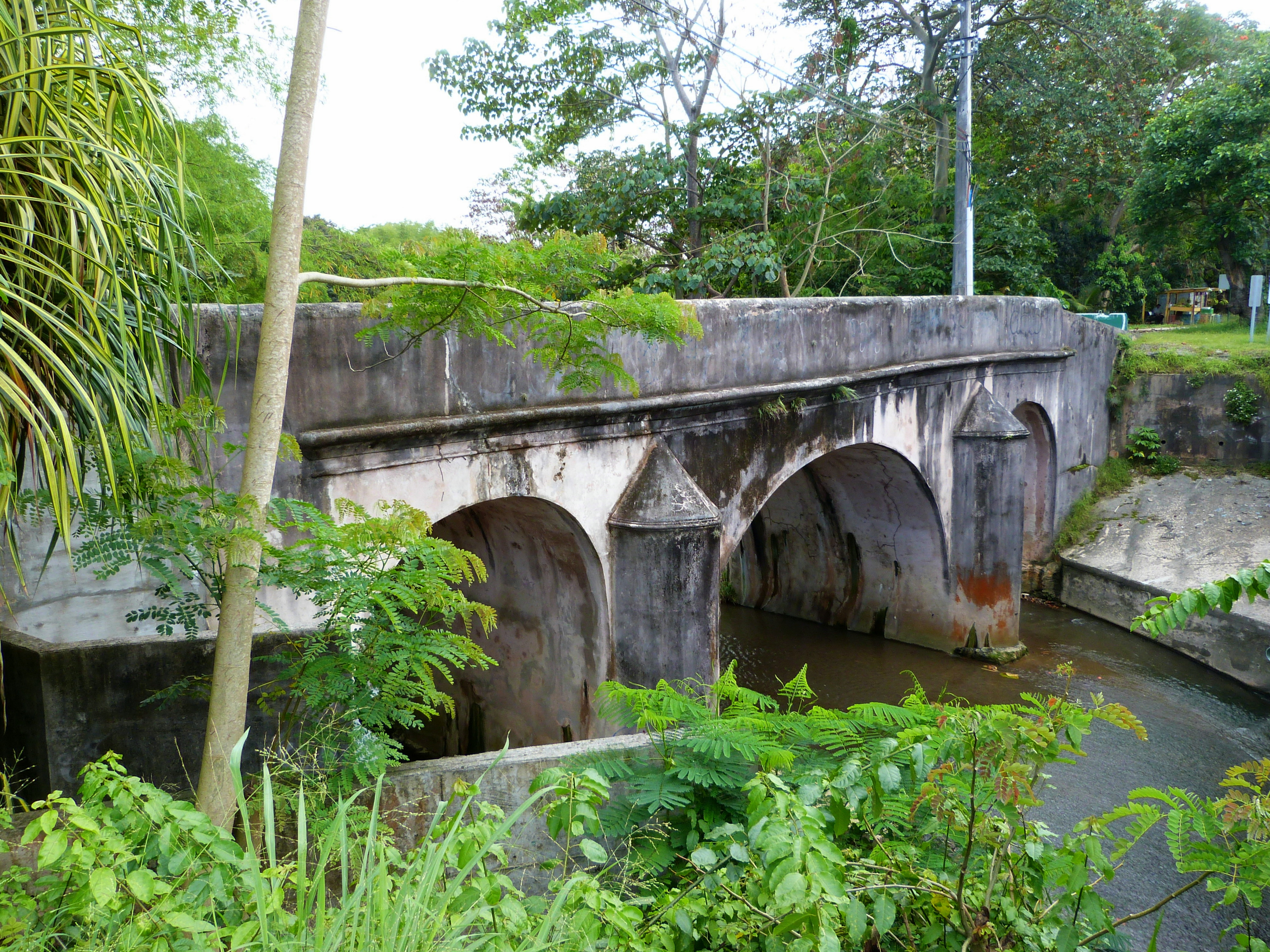
The bridge in 2017.

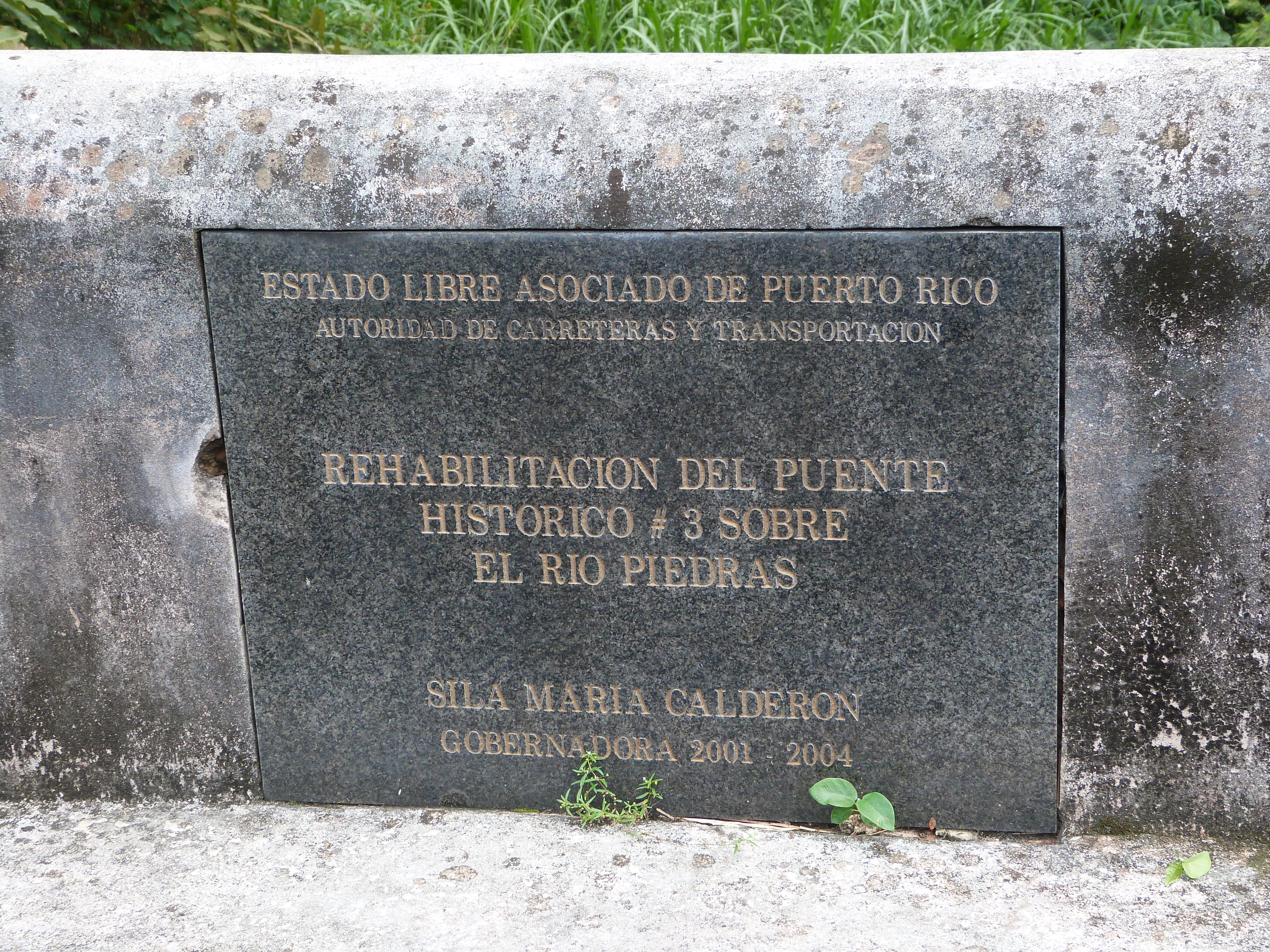
Bridge rededication plaque.

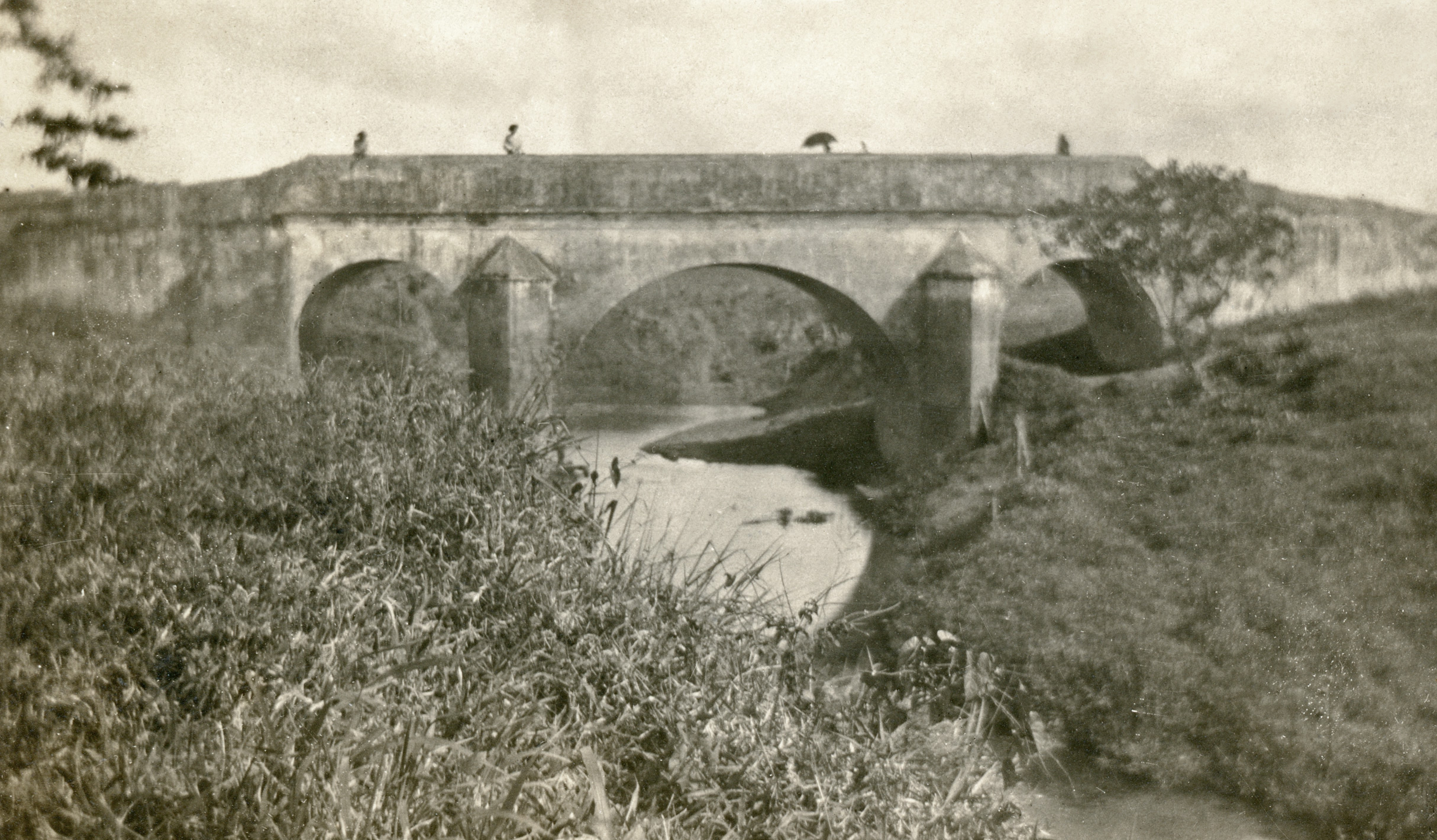
The bridge in 1911.

== See also ==
- List of bridges documented by the Historic American Engineering Record in Puerto Rico
