= Piedras River (San Juan, Puerto Rico) =

River in San Juan, Puerto Rico

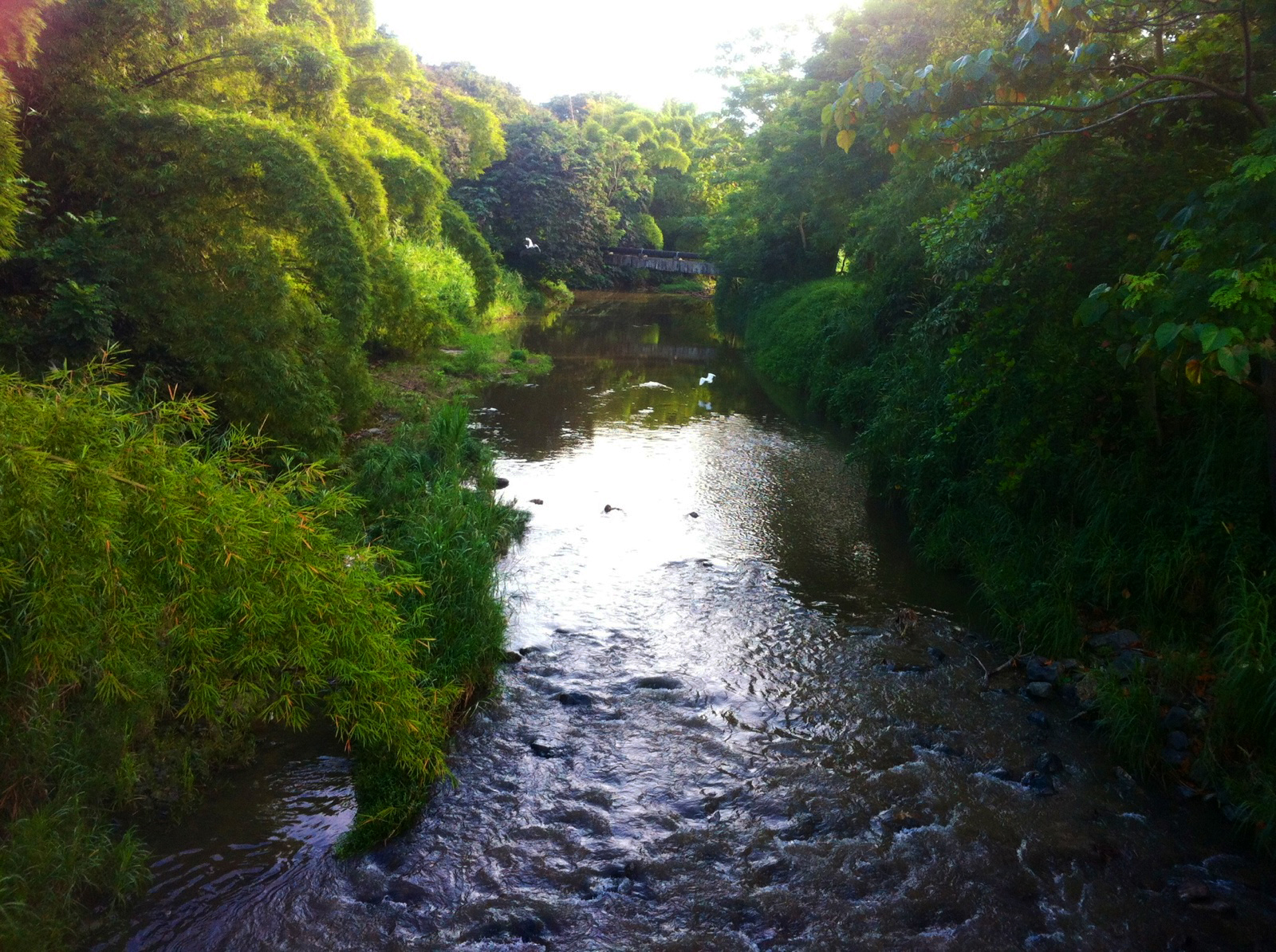

- Location within Puerto Rico
- Native name: Río Piedras (Spanish)

Location
- Commonwealth: Puerto Rico
- Municipality: San Juan

Physical characteristics
- Source
  - location: Caimito
- Mouth
  - location: Puerto Nuevo River in Hato Rey Norte
  - coordinates: 18°26′16″N 66°04′49″W

The Piedras River, better known as Río Piedras in Spanish, is a river of San Juan, Puerto Rico. The river gives its name to Río Piedras, a former town and municipality, today a district of San Juan.

Even if the Piedras River is considered a tributary of the Puerto Nuevo River, the hydrological basin it belongs to is often referred to as the Río Piedras watershed and it is ecologically important for the San Juan Bay estuary and the metropolitan region. The river is fed by numerous creeks and streams which have their source in the barrios of Caimito and Cupey.

== Gallery ==
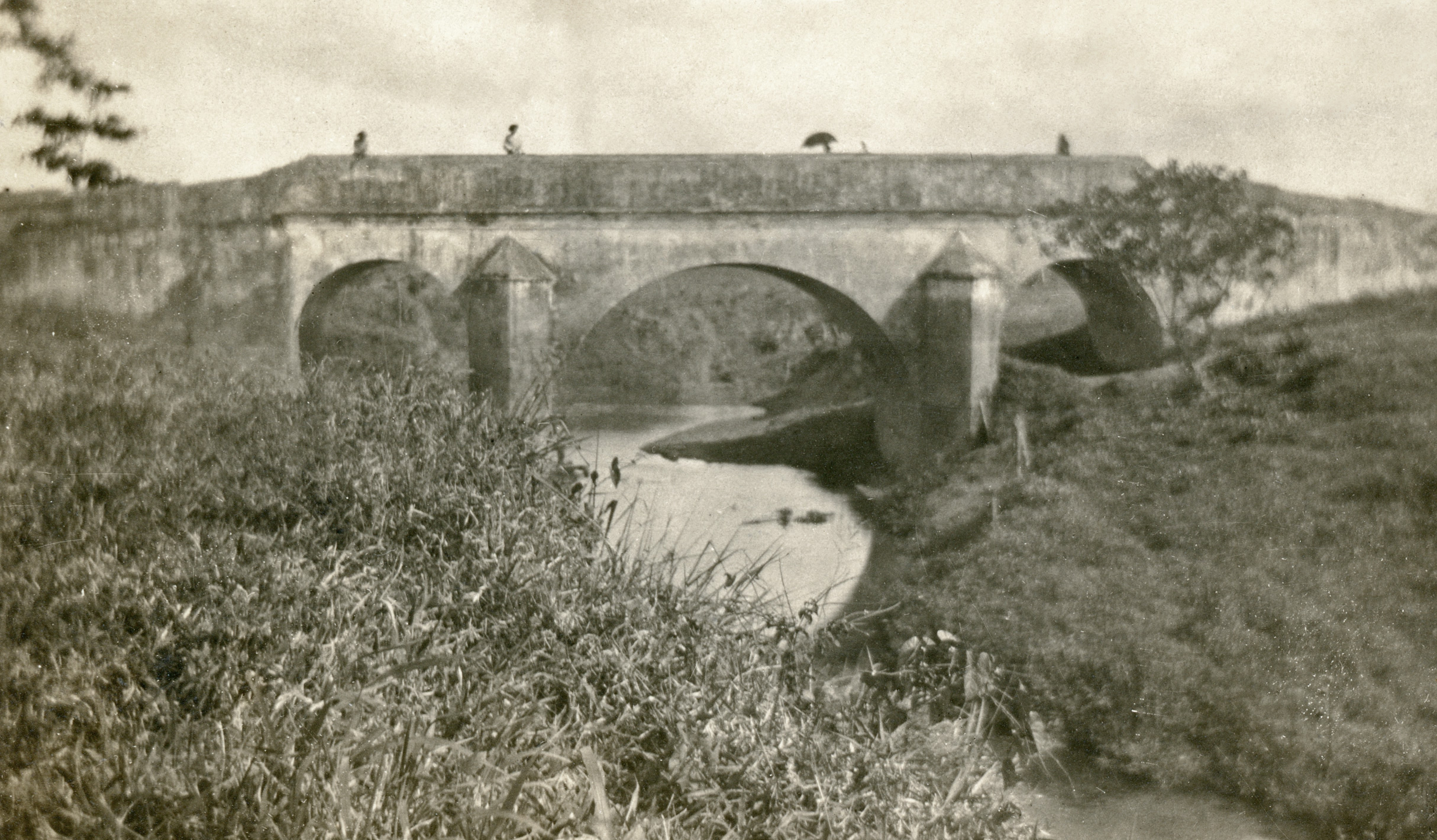
The historic Río Piedras Bridge in 1911.

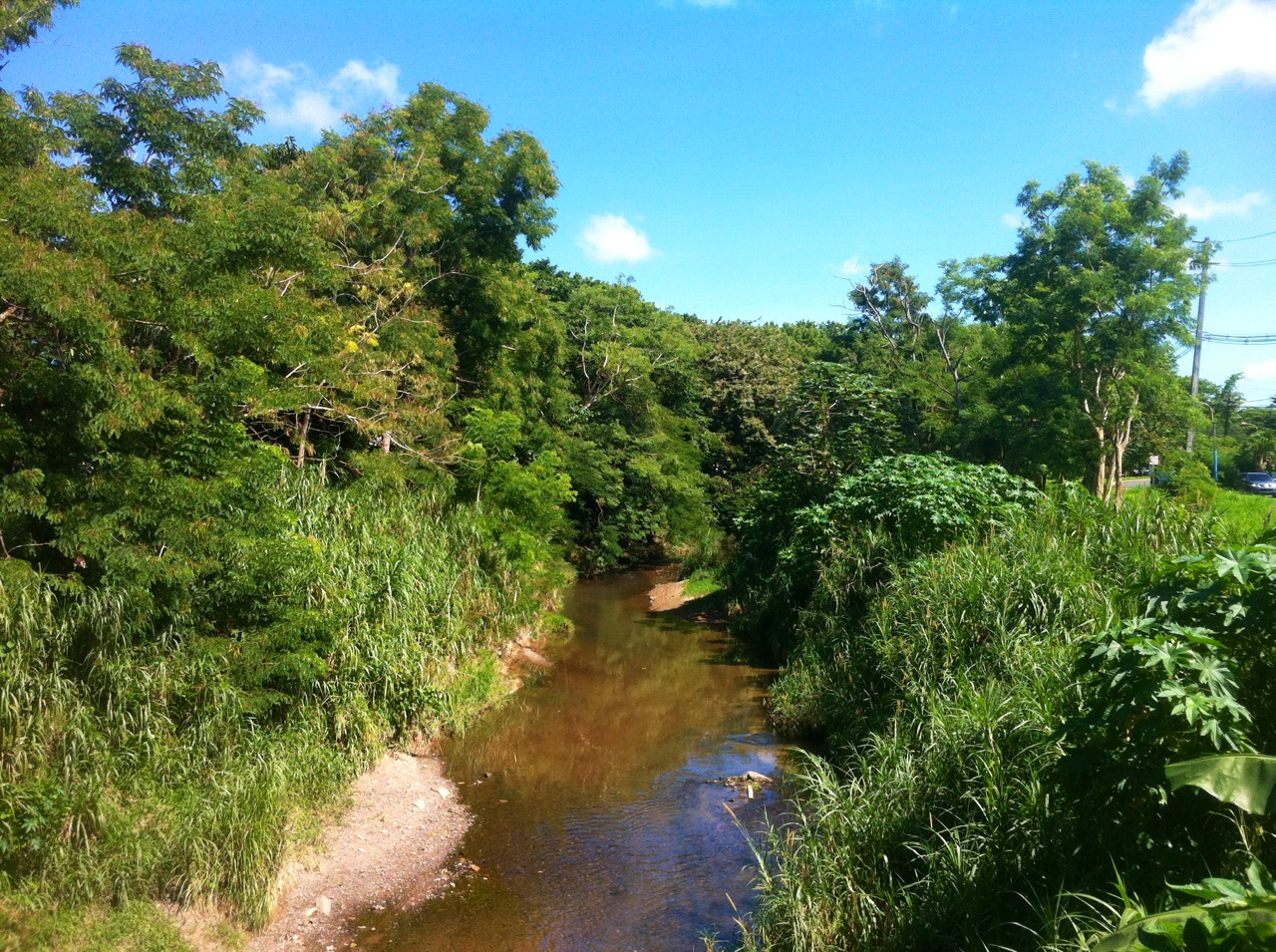
The river near El Cinco district.

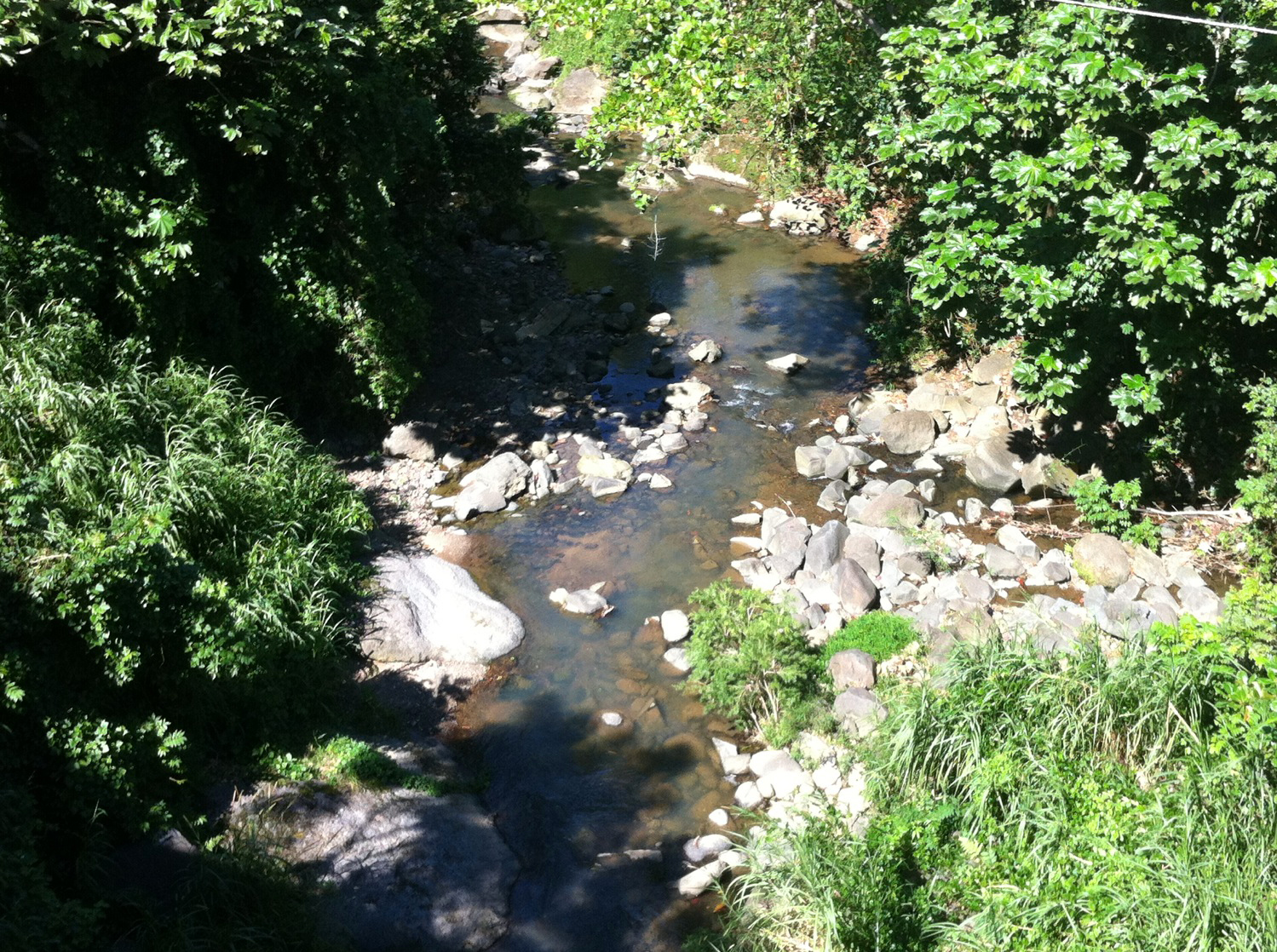
The river near El Cinco.

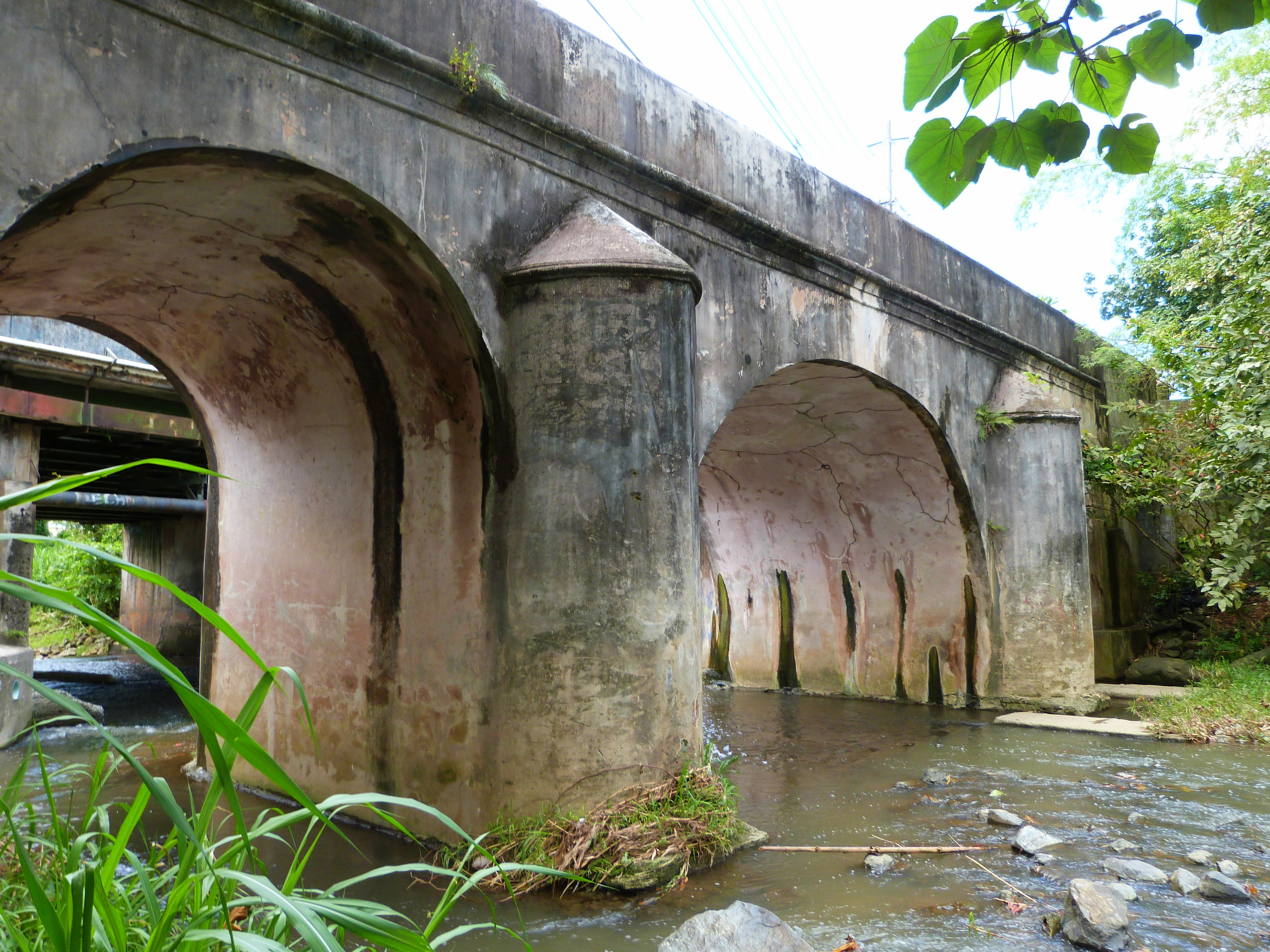
Río Piedras Bridge in 2017.

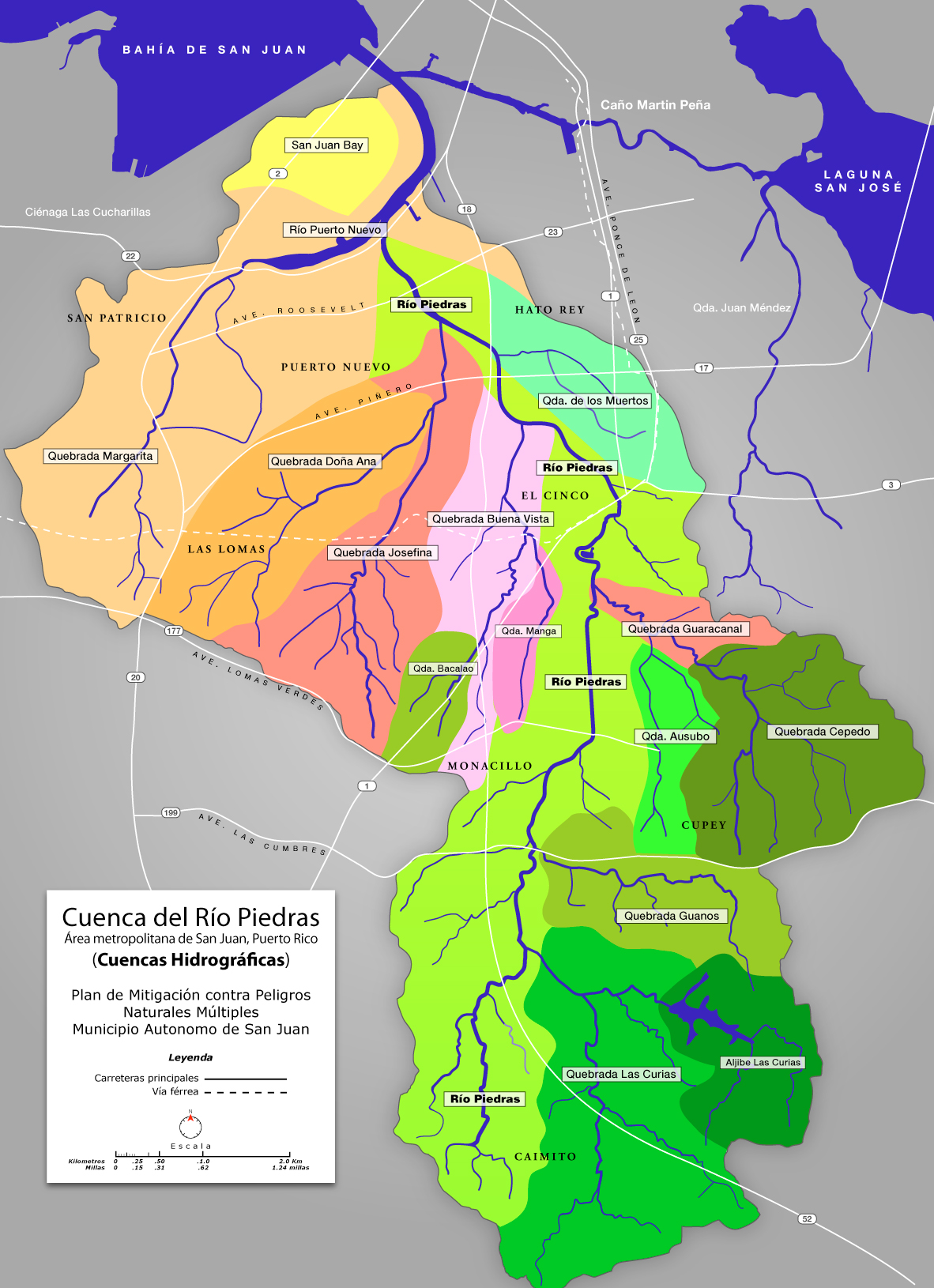
Map of the Piedras and Puerto Nuevo river basin.

== See also ==
- Old Piedras River Aqueduct
- List of rivers of Puerto Rico
