= Santa Rita (Hato Rey) =

Subbarrio of Hato Rey Sur barrio, in San Juan, Puerto Rico

Coordinates: 18.3992240°N 66.0542380°W

- Subbarrio
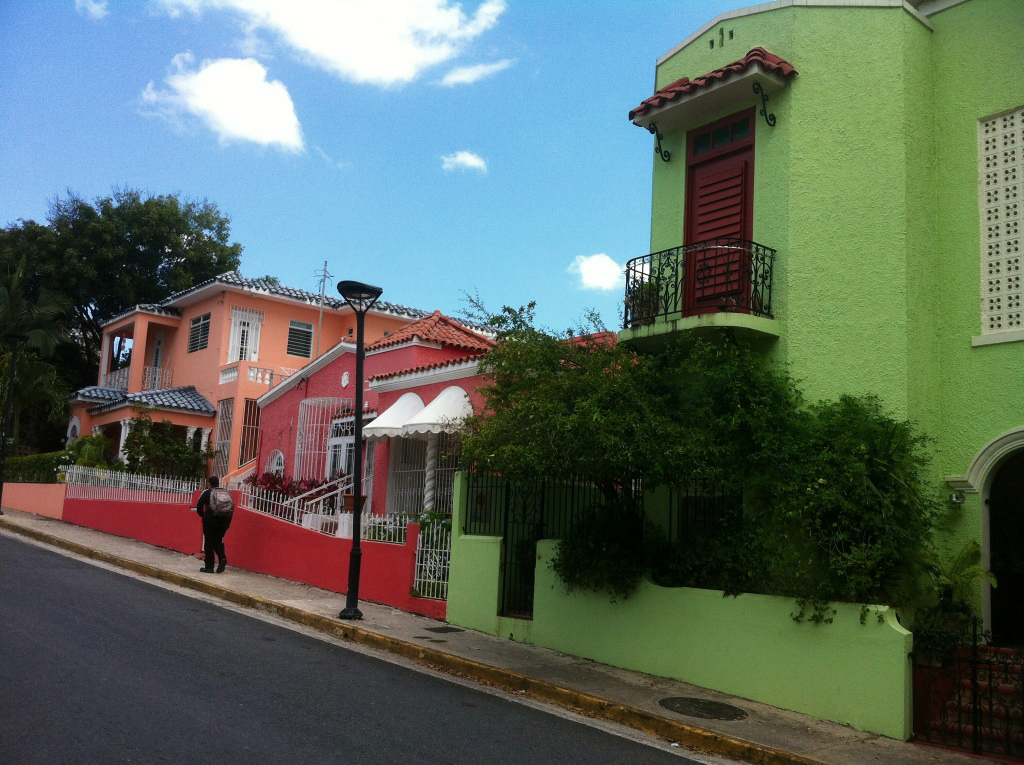
- Homes on Calle Borinqueña in Santa Rita subbarrio
- Interactive map of Santa Rita
- Commonwealth: Puerto Rico
- Municipality: San Juan
- Barrio: Hato Rey Sur

Government
  - Type: Mayor of San Juan
  - Mayor: Miguel Romero

Population
  - Total: 2,091
- Source: 2000 United States census

Santa Rita is one of the 4 subbarrios of Hato Rey Sur, itself one of 18 barrios of the municipality of San Juan, Puerto Rico.

The office of Amnesty International in Puerto Rico is located in Santa Rita.
