= Hato Rey Sur =

Barrio of San Juan, Puerto Rico

- Barrio
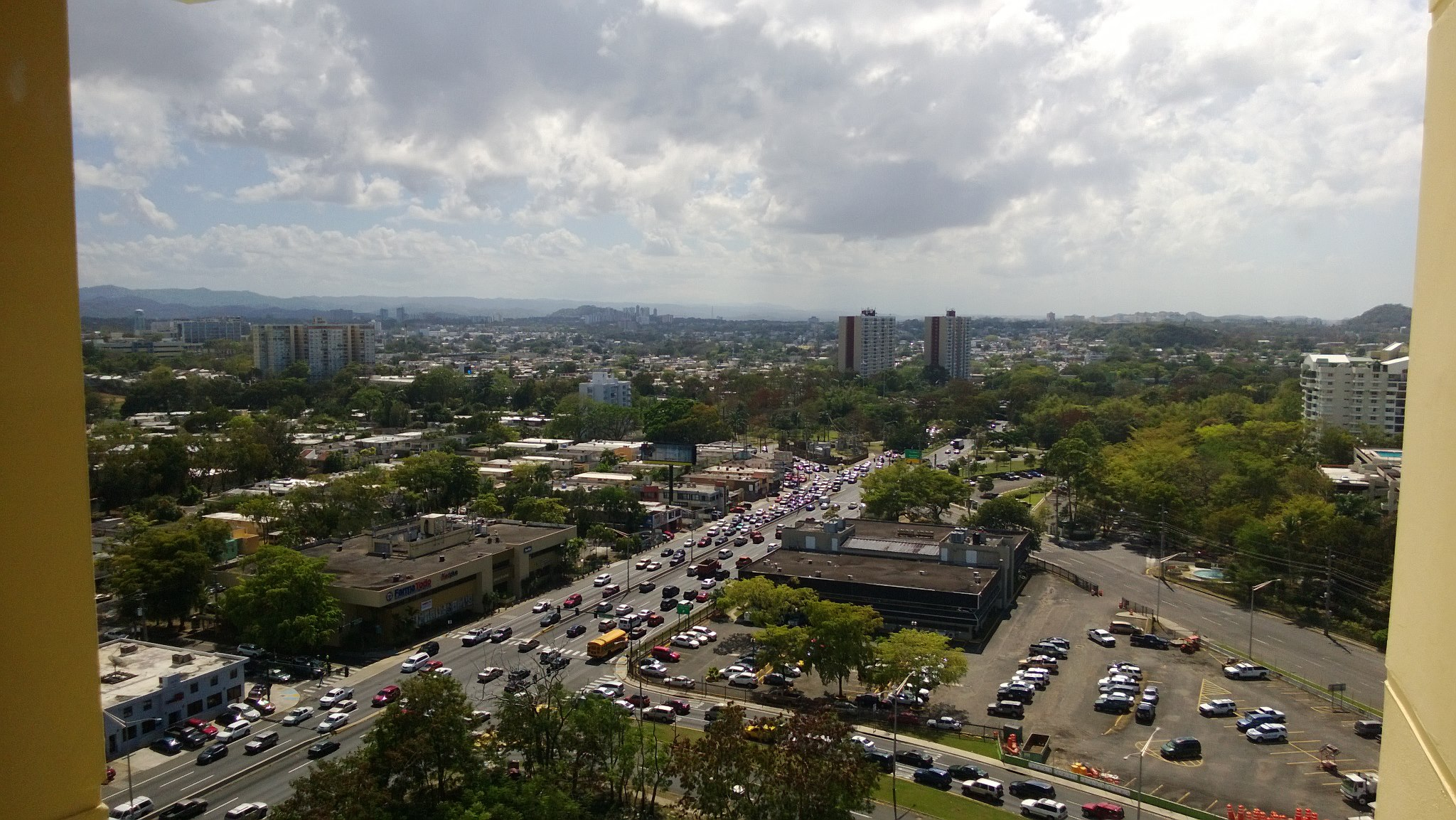
- Hyde Park sector of Rio Piedras district in Hato Rey Sur barrio of San Juan

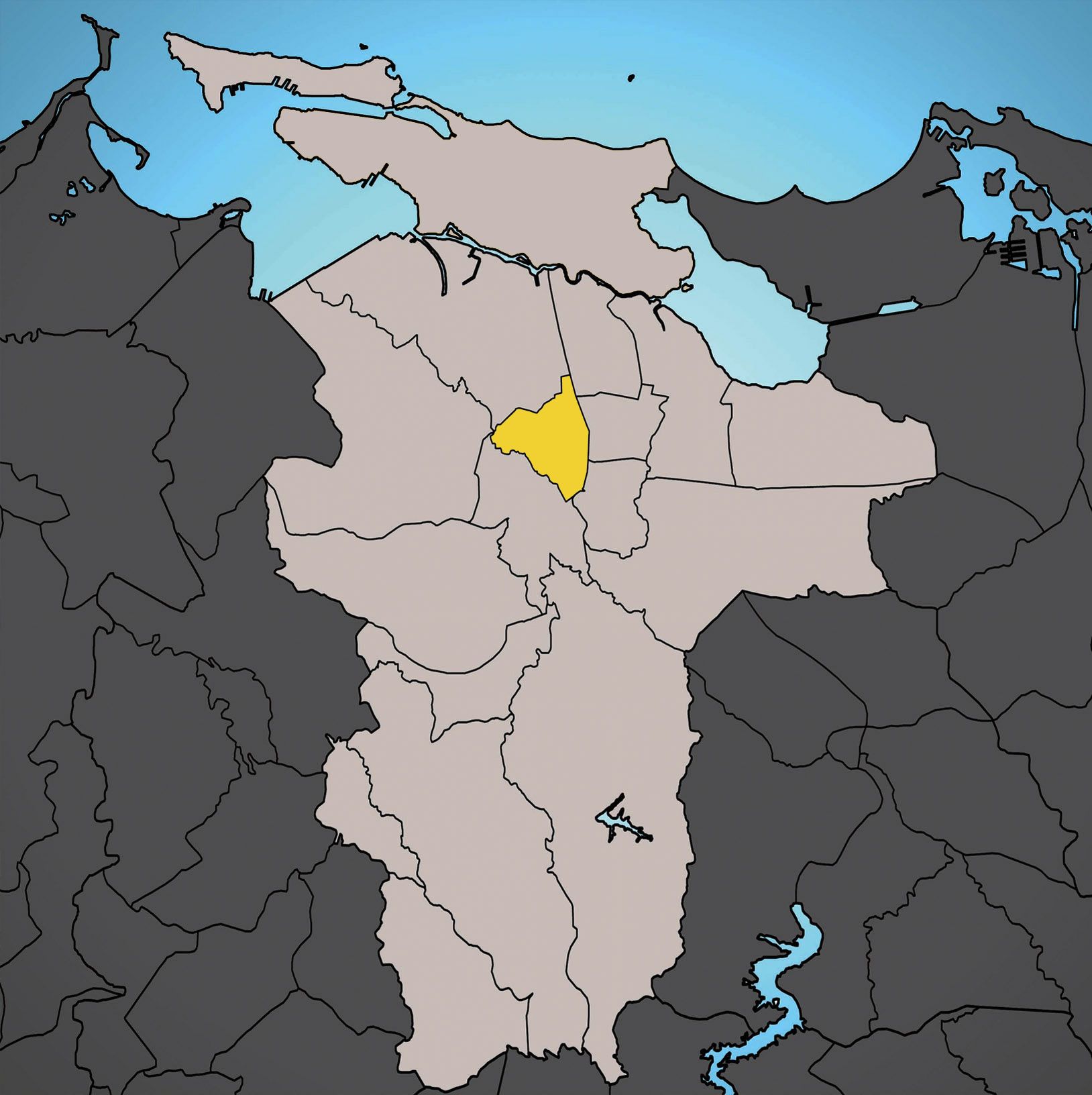
- Location of Hato Rey Sur shown in yellow
- Coordinates: 18°24′17″N 66°03′31″W
- Commonwealth: Puerto Rico
- Municipality: San Juan

Area
  - Total: 0.82 sq mi (2.1 km^{2})
  - Land: 0.82 sq mi (2.1 km^{2})
  - Water: 0 sq mi (0 km^{2})
- Elevation: 33 ft (10 m)

Population (2020)
  - Total: 8,863
  - Density: 11,000/sq mi (4,200/km^{2})
- Source: 2020 Census
- Time zone: UTC−4 (AST)

Hato Rey Sur is one of the 18 barrios of the municipality of San Juan, Puerto Rico. It is one of three barrios commonly known together as Hato Rey. Hato Rey Sur was a barrio of the former municipality of Rio Piedras, before it was merged with the municipality of San Juan in 1951. Following the annexation of Rio Piedras, the city of San Juan, and its surrounding area now including Rio Piedras, quadrupled its former size.

== Demographics ==
Historical population
Census	Pop.	Note	%±
1950	14,908		—
1960	11,947		−19.9%
1970	13,687		14.6%
1980	12,642		−7.6%
1990	12,915		2.2%
2000	10,868		−15.8%
2010	10,738		−1.2%
2020	8,863		−17.5%
U.S. Decennial Census; 1900 (N/A) 1910-1930; 1930-1950 1980-2000 2010

In 2020, Hato Rey Sur had a population of 8,863 residents.

== Subbarrios ==
The barrio of Hato Rey Sur is further subdivided into four “subbarrios".

- Bella Vista
- Hyde Park
- La 37
- Santa Rita

== Landmarks and places of interest ==
- EDP University, Hato Rey Campus
- Judicial Center of San Juan
- Universidad Avenue, the main nightlife and dining spot for students of the UPR.
- The University of Puerto Rico's main campus is also located closeby.

== Transportation ==
Although the only Tren Urbano station to be fully located within Hato Rey Sur is Piñero, the Rio Piedras and Universidad stations also serve the barrio due to their close proximity.

== Gallery ==
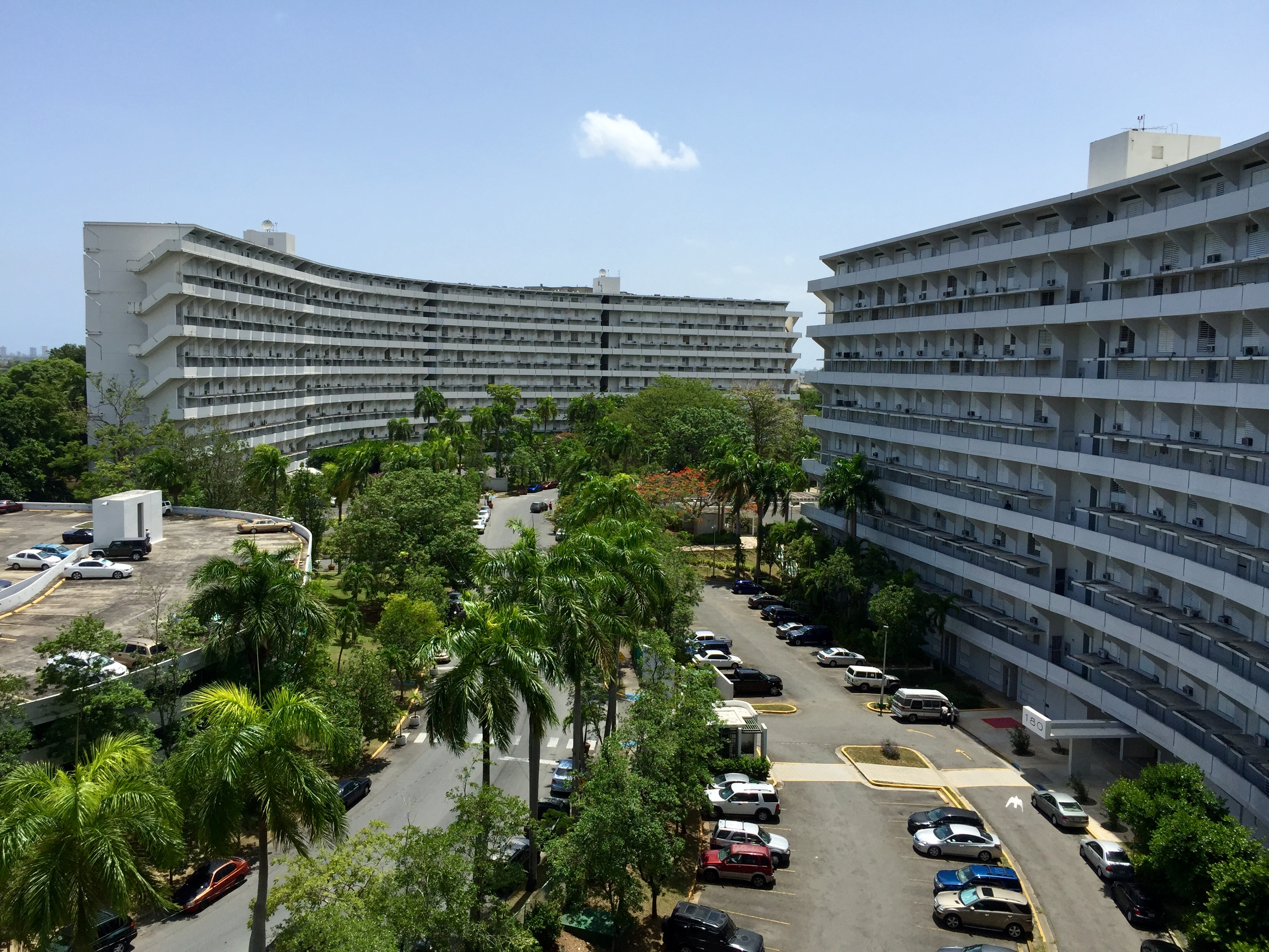
El Monte Condominium Towers

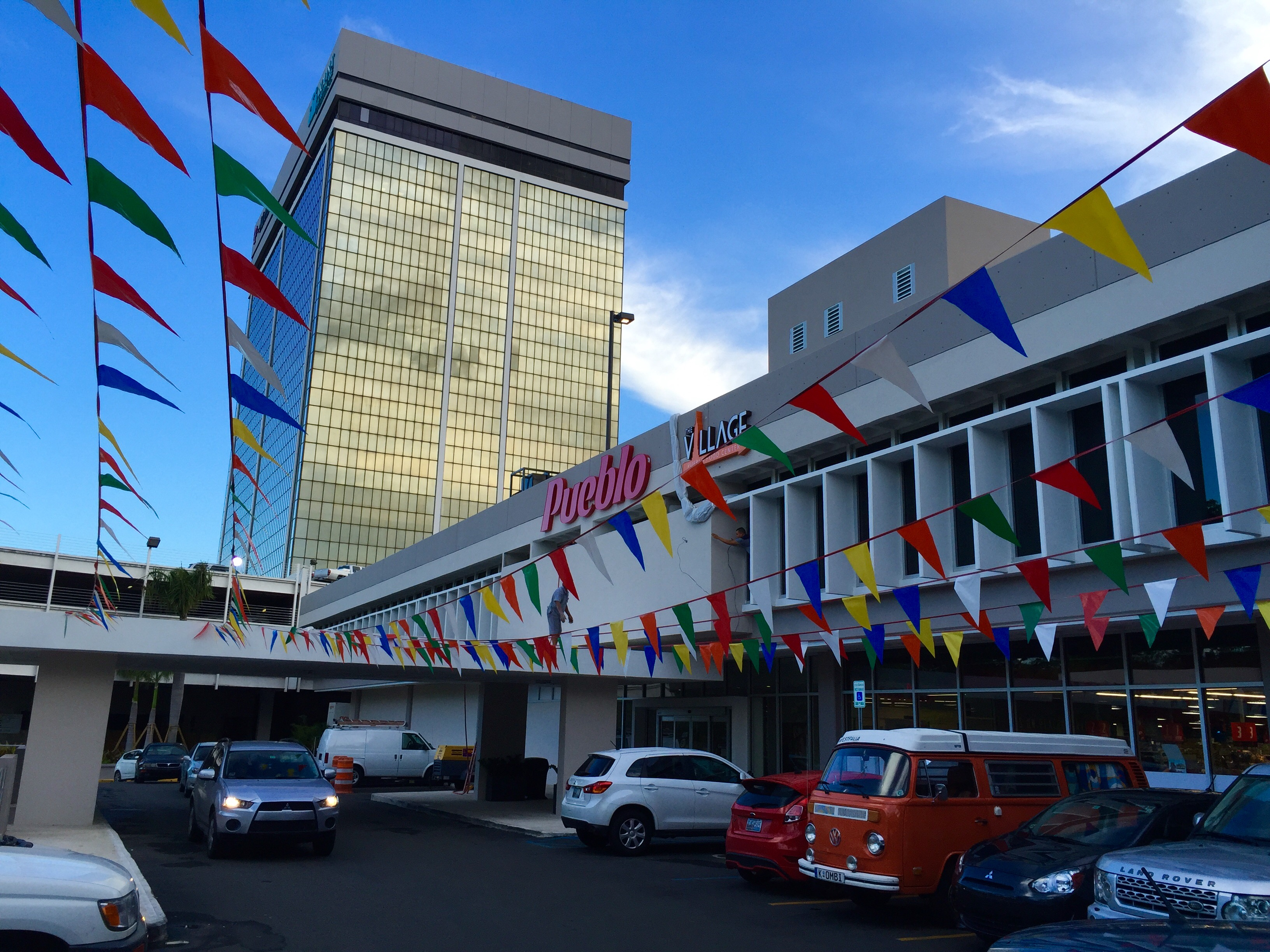
El Monte Mall

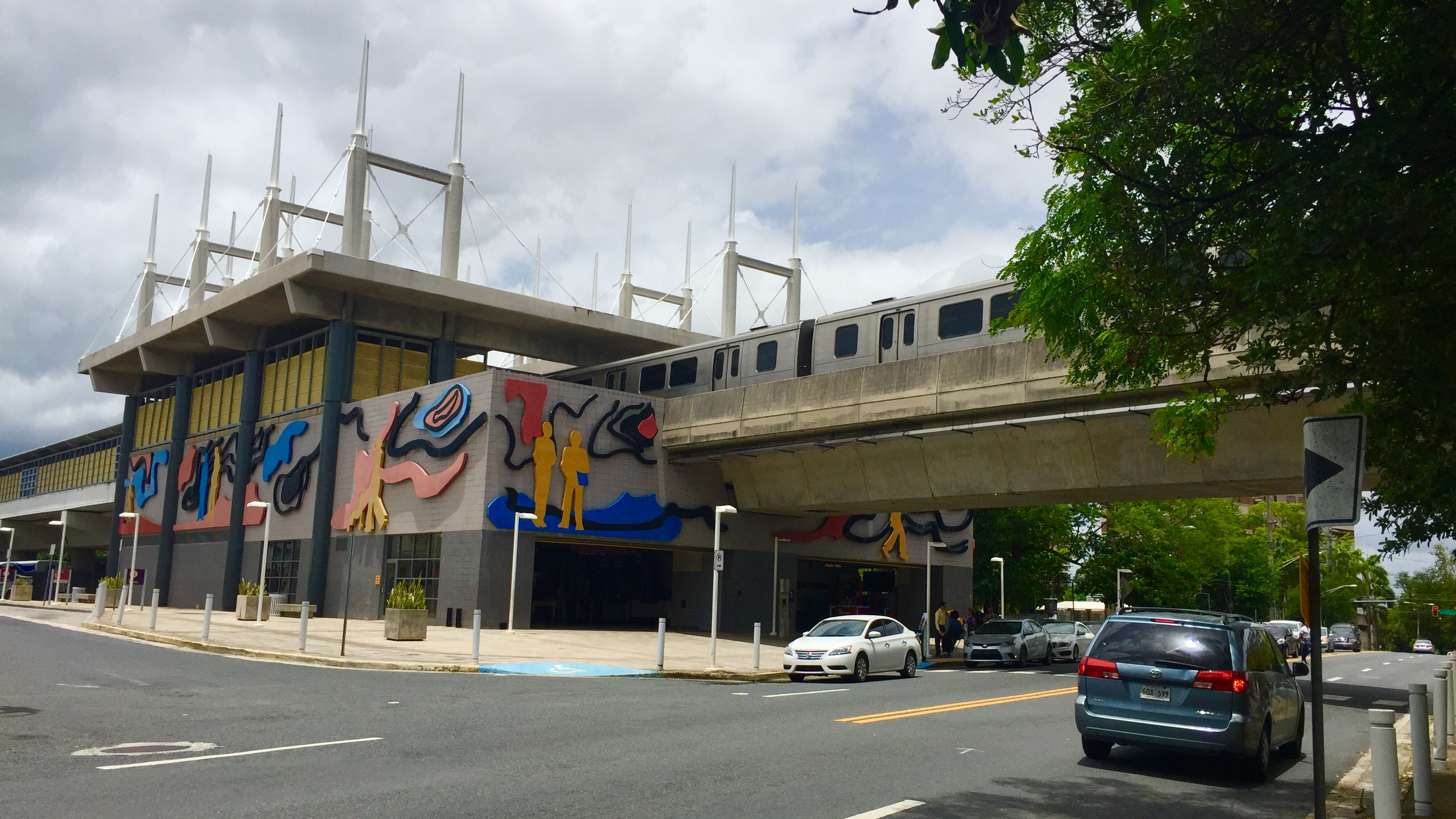
Piñero Station

== See also ==
- Hato Rey
- List of communities in Puerto Rico
