= Hyde Park (Hato Rey) =

Subbarrio of Hato Rey Sur barrio, in San Juan, Puerto Rico

Coordinates: 18.4038304°N 66.0610090°W

- Subbarrio
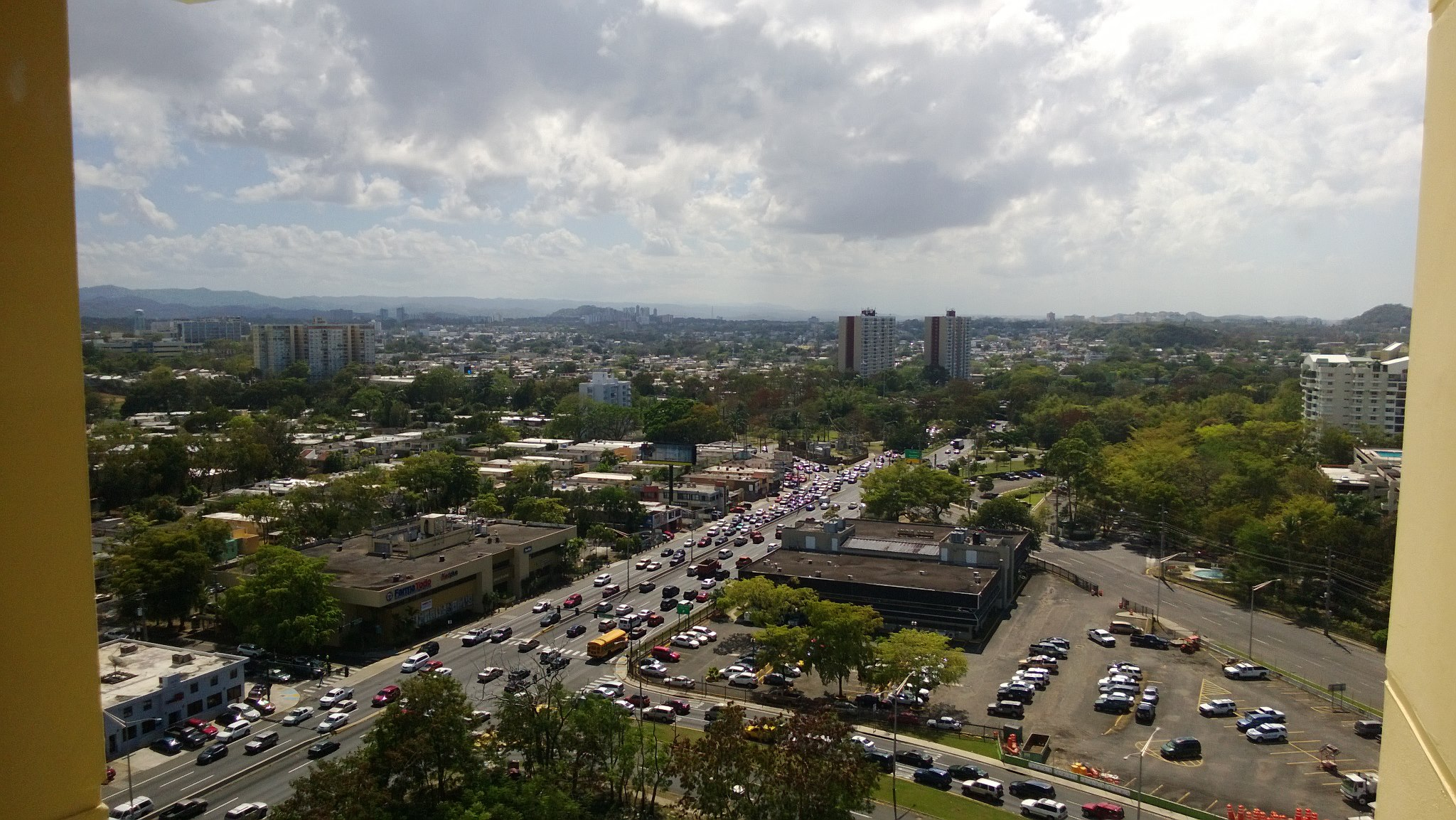
- View of Hyde Park
- Interactive map of Hyde Park
- Commonwealth: Puerto Rico
- Municipality: San Juan
- Barrio: Hato Rey Sur

Government
  - Type: Mayor of San Juan
  - Mayor: Miguel Romero

Population
  - Total: 5,706
- Source: 2000 United States census

Hyde Park is one of the 4 subbarrios of Hato Rey Sur, itself one of 18 barrios of the municipality of San Juan, Puerto Rico.
