= La 37 (Hato Rey) =

Subbarrio of Hato Rey Sur barrio, in San Juan, Puerto Rico

Coordinates: 18.4083664°N 66.0546080°W

- Subbarrio
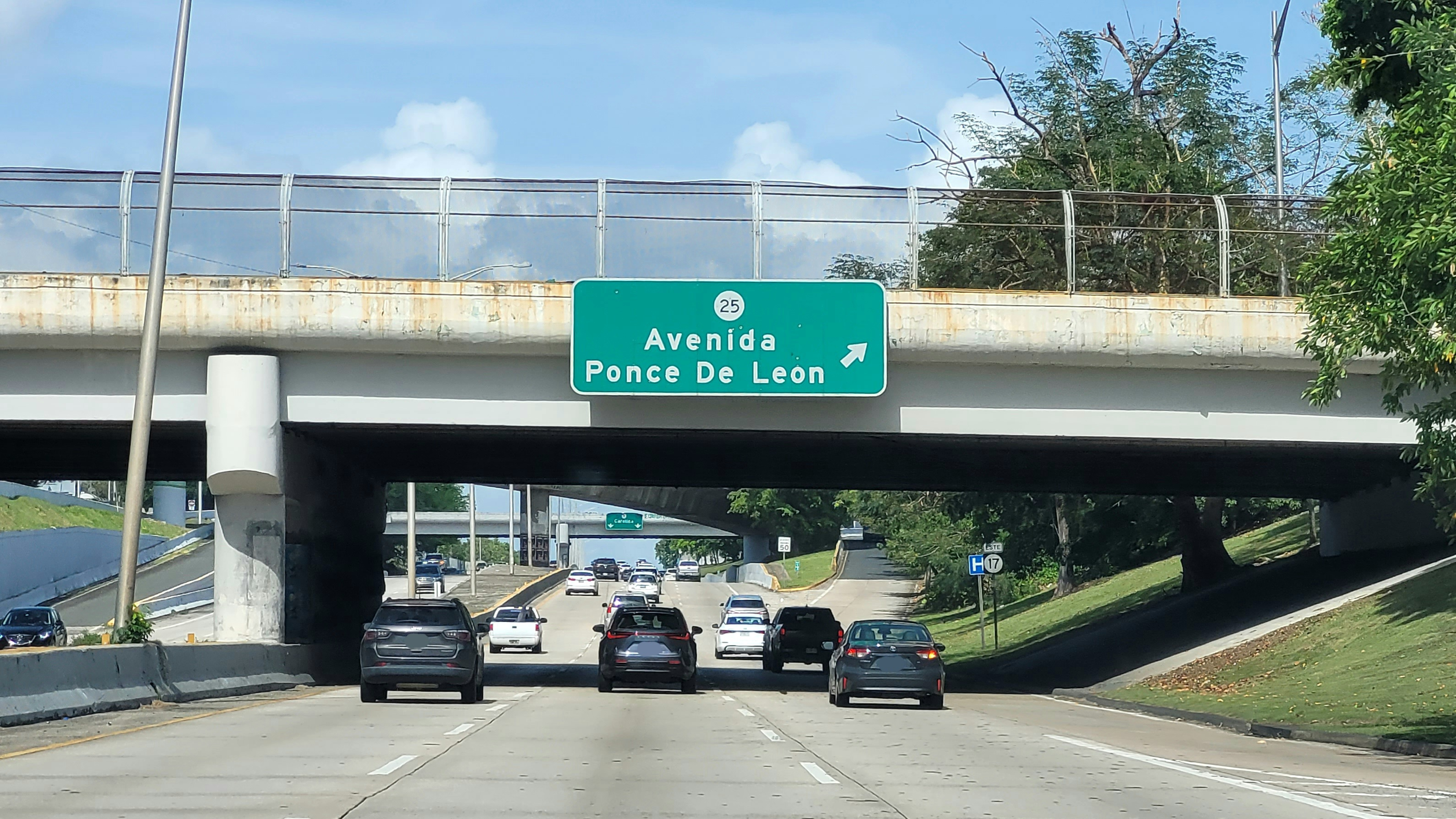
- Puerto Rico Highway 17 in La 37
- Interactive map of La 37
- Commonwealth: Puerto Rico
- Municipality: San Juan
- Barrio: Hato Rey Sur

Government
  - Type: Mayor of San Juan
  - Mayor: Carmen Yulín Cruz

Population
  - Total: 1,332
- Source: 2000 United States census

La 37 is one of the 4 subbarrios of Hato Rey Sur, itself one of 18 barrios of the municipality of San Juan, Puerto Rico.
