= Puerto Nuevo River =

River of Puerto Rico

Río Puerto Nuevo
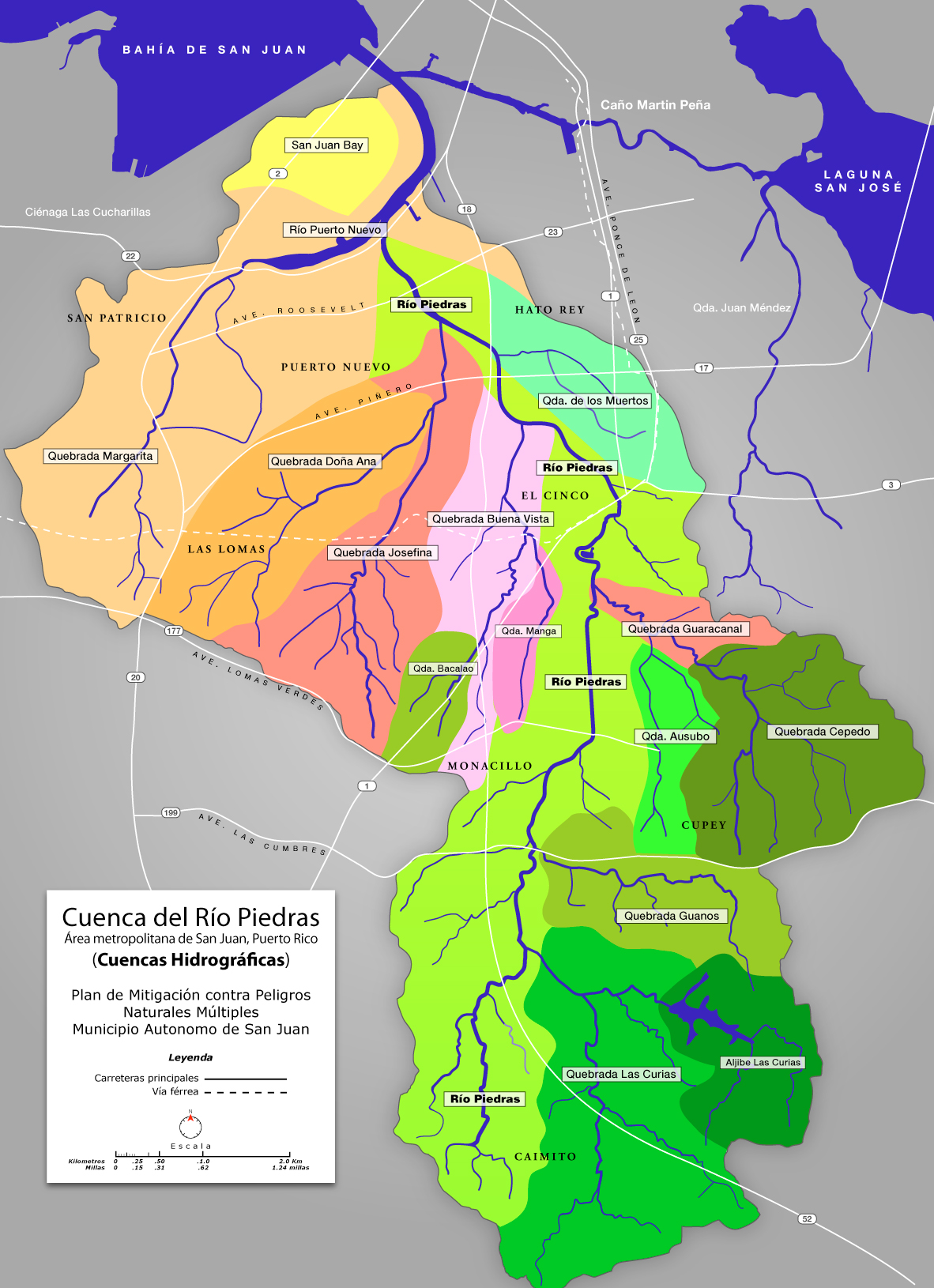
- Map of the Piedras-Puerto Nuevo river basin.

Location
- Commonwealth: Puerto Rico
- Municipality: San Juan

Physical characteristics
- Source
  - coordinates: 18.4388351°N 66.0818326°W

The Río Puerto Nuevo is a river of Puerto Rico.

== Flood control project ==
In mid 2018, the United States Army Corps of Engineers announced it would be undertaking a major flood control project of the river, with a budget of $1552.4 million.

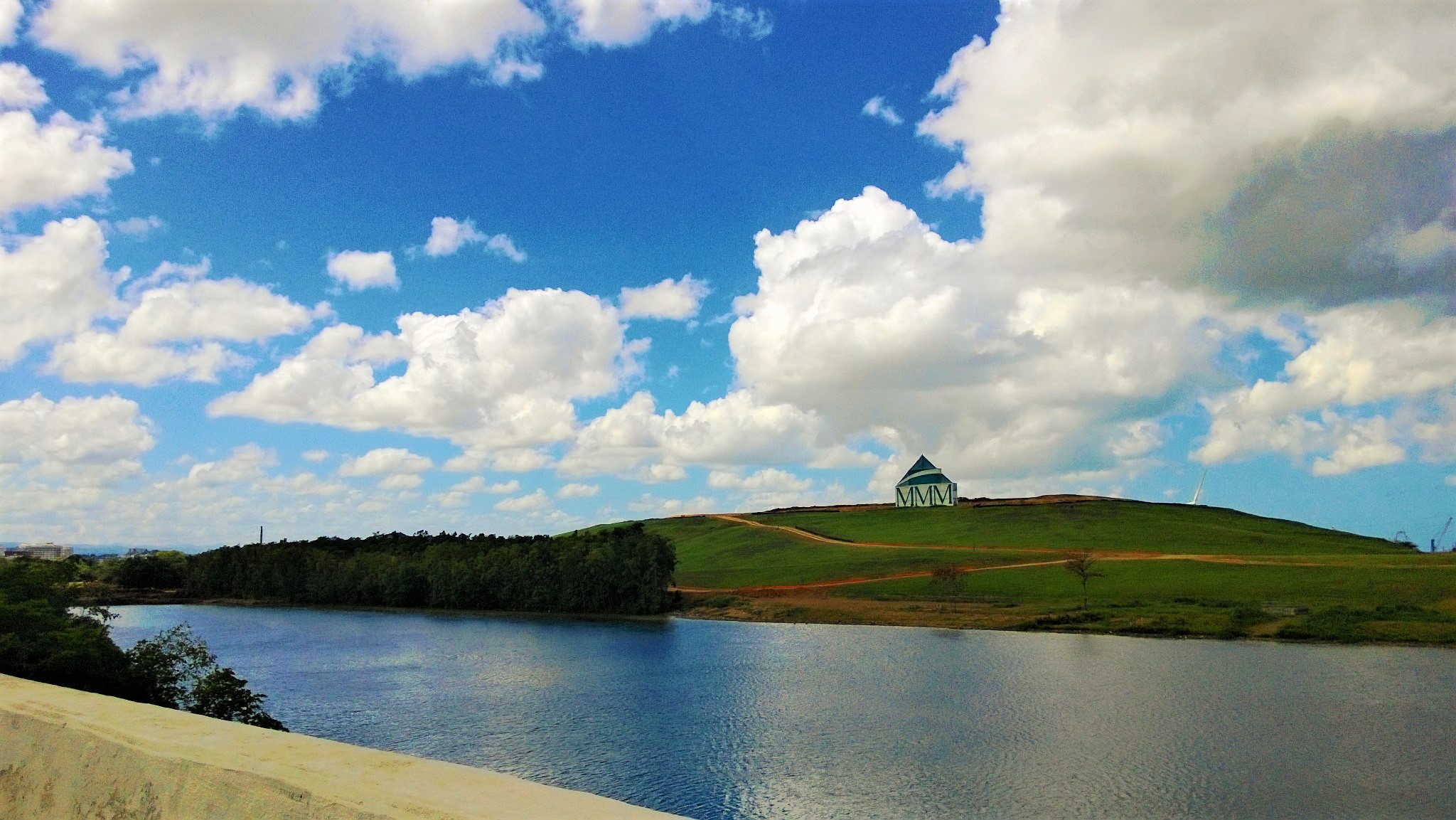
Puerto Nuevo River near Plaza Las Américas

== See also ==
- List of rivers of Puerto Rico
