= El Monte Mall =

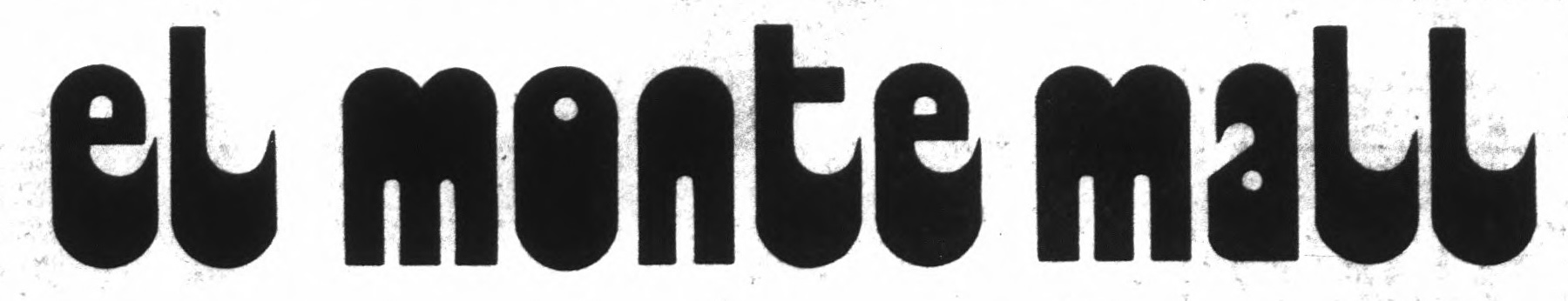
- Mall logo from 1978
- Location: San Juan, Puerto Rico
- Coordinates: 18°24′34″N 66°3′25″W
- Address: 652 Ave. Luis Muñoz Rivera
- Opened: 24 August 1967
- Developer: Kenny and Company
- Architect: Edward Larrabee Barnes
- Num. of anchor tenants: 1
- Floors: 2

El Monte Mall is an enclosed shopping mall located in San Juan, Puerto Rico. It is considered the first climate controlled indoor mall on the island.

== History ==
=== 1960s-1970s ===
On August 24, 1967, at a cost of $2 million, being developed by Kenny and Company, El Monte Mall inaugurated to much fanfare. Being the first climate controlled enclosed mall in Puerto Rico, on opening it had 100,000 square feet of retail space and parking for 271 vehicles. It was anchored by a Pueblo Supermarket, and had more than 30 establishments with 44 offices which included places such as Zales Jewelers, B & S Drug discount pharmacy, Banco Crédito & Ahorro Ponceño, Carmen Chirino boutique, Crest Shoes, Dulcería Teen, Elenjul children's wear, Estrella's Modas, Furniture Super Marts, Guys and Dolls sportswear, International Boutique, Sterling House Gift Shop, Van Daalen Brothers Electrical Appliances, Top's Men's Wear, and The Brothers Zito Hairstylists, among others. It also had a restaurant named La Taberna Pub.

In 1967, editors of Urbe, at the time the only publication on architecture in the Caribbean, gave a design award to El Monte Mall for "the best commercial architecture" that year.

On February 26, 1968, a Banco Crédito de Hyde Park inaugurated at the mall.

In May 1970, The Brothers Zito opened a new location at the second level of the mall. It was called a "Wig Center" specializing in such.

In November 1975, the El Monte Mall Tenants Association appealed to the San Juan Superior Court alleging that El Monte Corporation violated the lease agreement with its tenants by establishing paid parking, when it had promised to provide it for free. The El Monte Mall Tenants Association requested that the court issue a permanent injunction addressed to the defendants, El Monte Corporation, Interstate General Corporation and Aparcadores Nativos, Inc., ordering them to refrain from limiting, restricting or impeding in any way, to the plaintiffs and their customers and guests, free access to the parking facilities located on the first floor of the mall building. The plaintiffs considered that the imminent action that the defendant contemplated to carry out constituted a flagrant violation of the current lease agreements they had and would cause immediate and irreparable damage to all the plaintiffs and to all those who are affected as tenants and clients or sponsors from the mall. According to the lawsuit, on October 17, the co-defendant Interstate General Corporation, as agent of the El Monte Corporation, sent a letter to all tenants of the El Monte Mall, informing them that as of November 1, 1975, Aparcadores Nativos, Inc. would be in charge of the parking facilities.

In December 1978, the mall housed a Field's Department Store specializing in women's undergarments.

=== 2010s, and on ===
On May 25, 2016, at a cost of $6 million, Pueblo Supermarkets re-opened a new store at the mall. The store was originally situated in the mall's ground floor and moved to the second floor counting with 34,000 square feet.

In October 2016, a Planet Fitness opened at the mall.

== Gallery ==
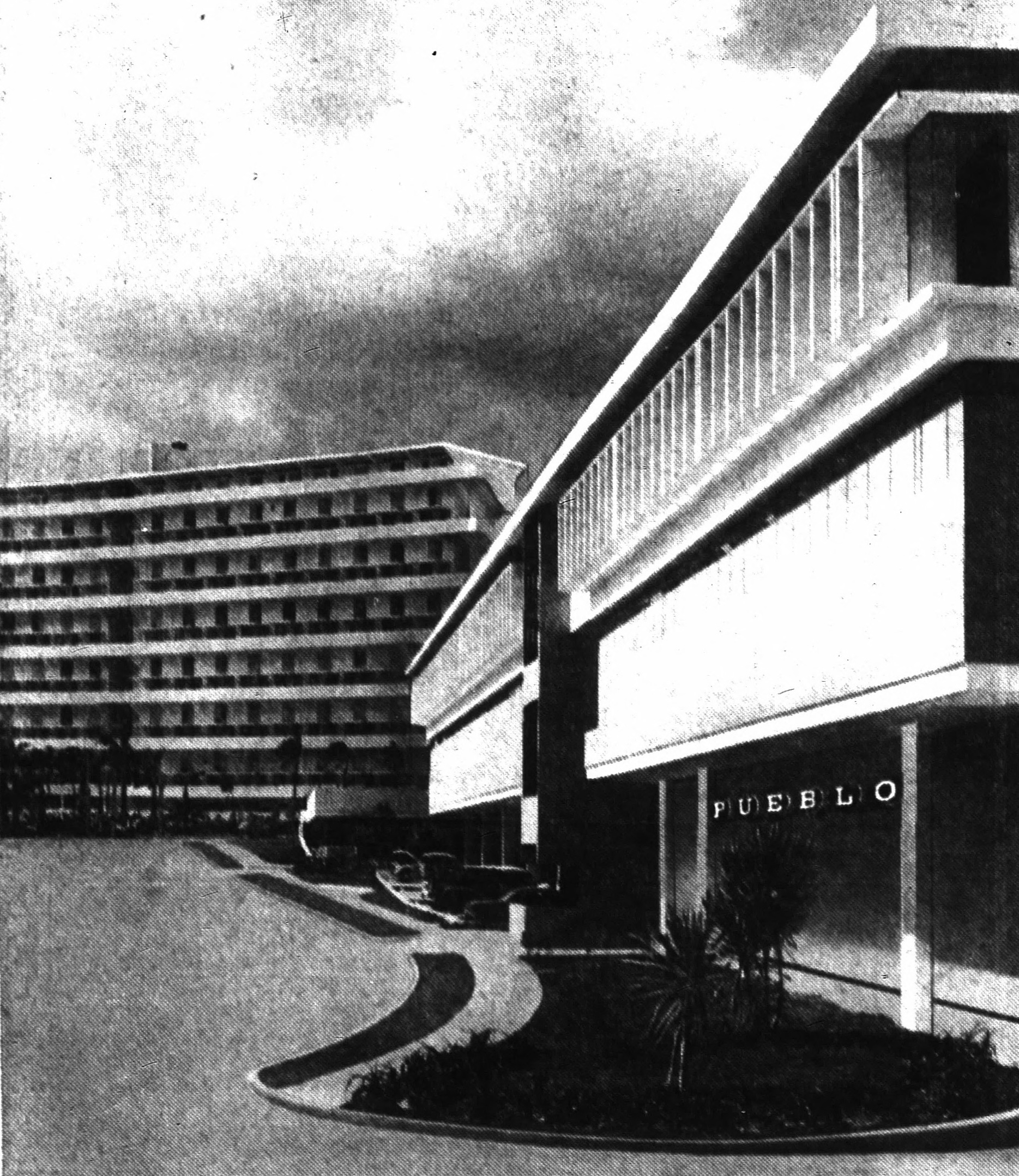
Concept image for Pueblo Supermarket at El Monte Mall in 1967

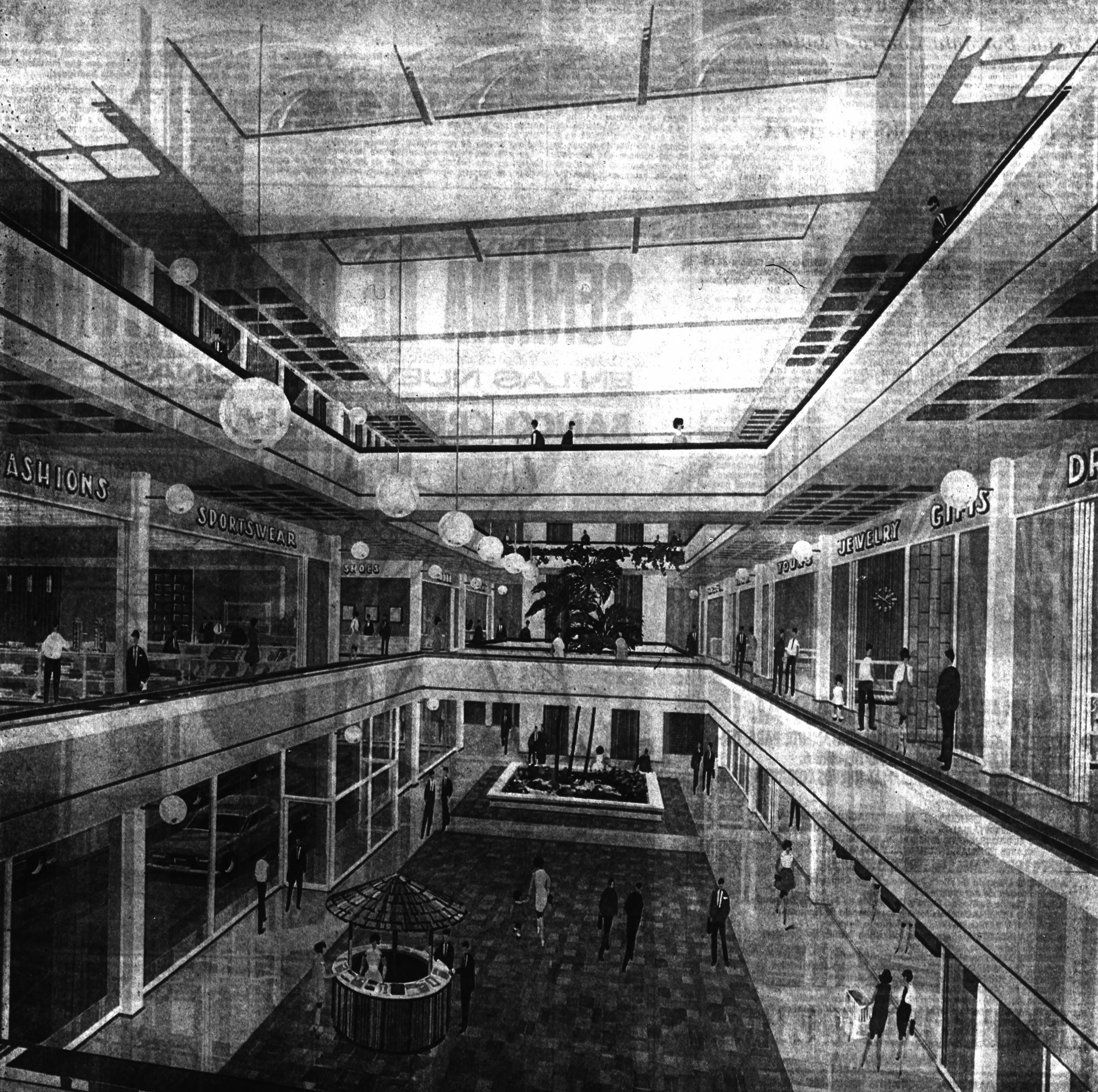
Concept image for El Monte Mall in 1967

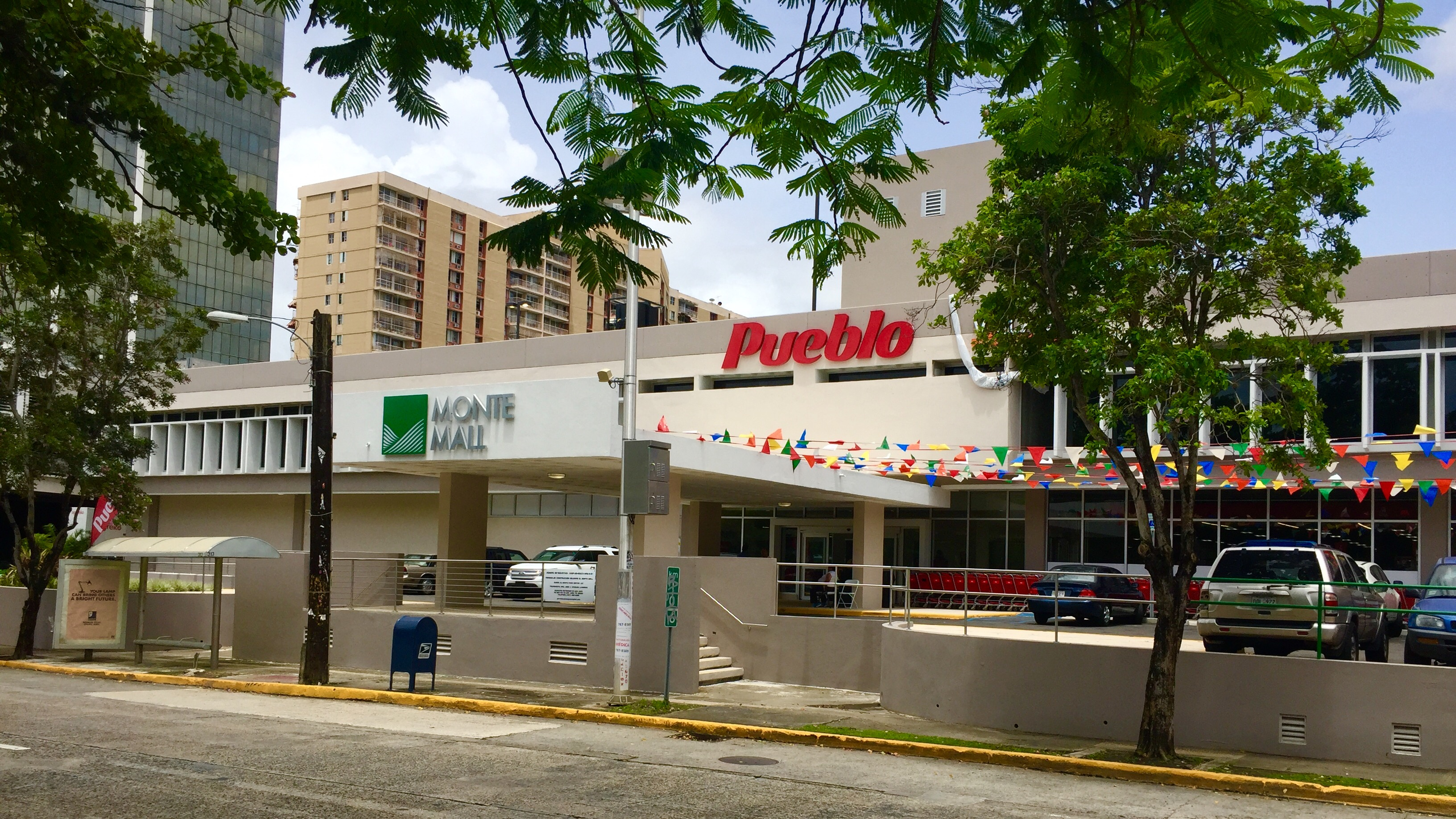
Pueblo Supermarkets after re-inauguration in 2016
