= Nuevo Milenio State Forest =

State forest in San Juan, Puerto Rico

Nuevo Milenio State Forest Spanish: Bosque Estatal del Nuevo Milenio
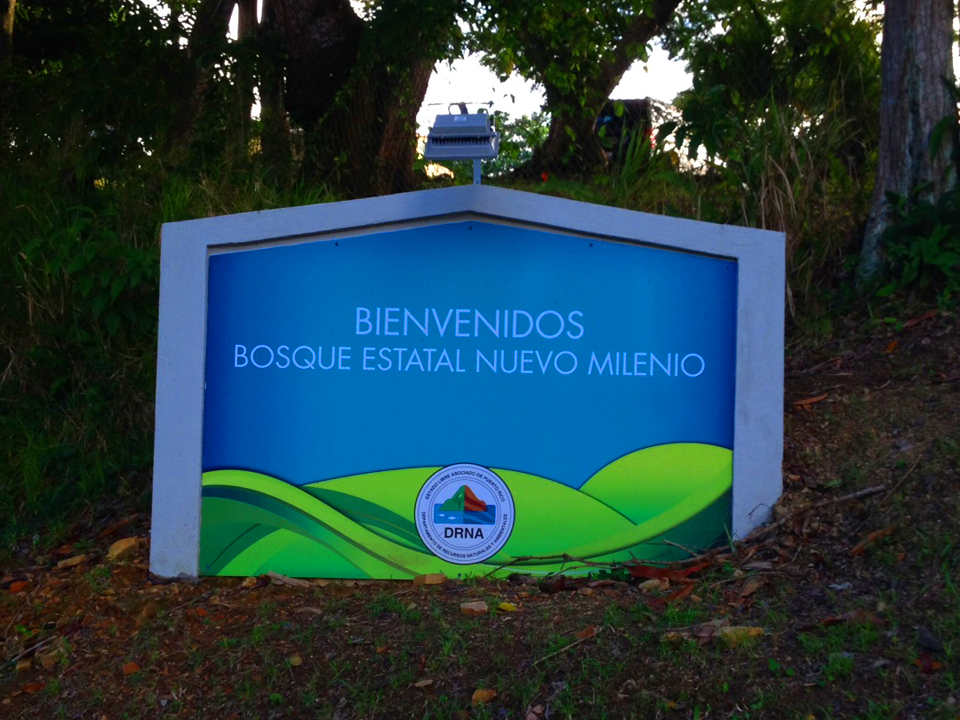
- Entrance sign to the urban forest.

Geography
- Location: San Juan, Puerto Rico
- Elevation: 427 feet (130 m)
- Area: 400 cuerdas (390 acres)

Administration
- Governing body: Puerto Rico Department of Natural and Environmental Resources (DRNA) and the Municipality of San Juan
- Website: www.drna.pr.gov

Ecology
- Ecosystem: Second-growth Subtropical Moist Zone forest
- WWF Classification: Puerto Rican moist forests

Nuevo Milenio State Forest (Spanish: Bosque Estatal del Nuevo Milenio or Bosque Urbano del Nuevo Milenio) is one of the 20 forests that make up the public forest system of Puerto Rico. The forest is located east of the University of Puerto Rico Botanical Garden in the Sabana Llana Sur district of San Juan, making it one of the two state forests located within the capital's municipal boundaries (the other being San Patricio State Forest).

== History ==
The area where the forest now stands had originally been deforested and was the site of several quarries. The forest reserve was first proclaimed in 1998 with the intention of preserving one of the last green areas in San Juan as a secondary forest. The city is very densely populated and has lost most of its forests due to urban sprawl. This was done thanks to the effort of local residents, academics and environmentalists. In 2003 the forest was added to the San Juan Ecological Corridor management zone, also managed by the municipality of San Juan which designates the area as ecologically important as it forms part of the hydrological basin of the estuary of San Juan Bay. Between the years 1998 and 2005 the forest was used for research purposes for studying the impact of Hurricane Georges in the destruction and regrowth of the forest.

== Ecology ==
=== Flora ===
The forest is very characteristic of the secondary forest ecosystem found throughout Puerto Rico. Some native tree species found in the forest are the yarumo (Cecropia schreberiana), the West Indian locust tree (Hymenaea courbaril), the Puerto Rican royal palm tree (Roystonea borinquena), and the pink trumpet tree (Tabebuia heterophylla) or Puerto Rican oak as it is colloquially known. Common introduced trees found in the forest are the flea tree (Albizia lebbeck), the karoi tree (Albizia procera) and the Malay pterocarpus (Pterocarpus indicus).

=== Fauna ===
The forest is home to native species such as the zenaida dove (Zenaida aurita), the scaly-naped pigeon (Patagioenas squamosa), the gray kingbird (Tyrannus dominicensis), the northern mockingbird (Mimus polyglottos), bananaquits (Coereba flaveola), red-tailed hawks (Buteo jamaicensis) and the Puerto Rican mango (Anthracothorax aurulentus); endemic species such as the Puerto Rican woodpecker (Melanerpes portoricensis), the Puerto Rican spindalis (Spindalis portoricensis), the Puerto Rican tanager (Nesospingus speculiferus) and the green mango hummingbird (Anthracothorax viridis); and migratory species such as the black-and-white warbler (Mniotilta varia), the Caribbean martin (Progne dominicensis) and the black-whiskered vireo (Vireo altiloquues). The forest is also home to several reptile and amphibian species such as the Puerto Rican crested anole (Anolis cristatellus) and the common coqui (Leptodactylus albilabris).

== Recreation ==
Although being located next to the San Juan Botanical Garden, the urban forest is not usually open to visitors and those interested in visiting it should contact the forest offices to arrange a visit (787-772-2009). The forest offers great opportunities for birdwatching and nature photography for those who do visit.

== See also ==
- List of state forests of Puerto Rico
- San Patricio State Forest
