= San Juan Botanical Garden =

Botanical garden in San Juan, Puerto Rico

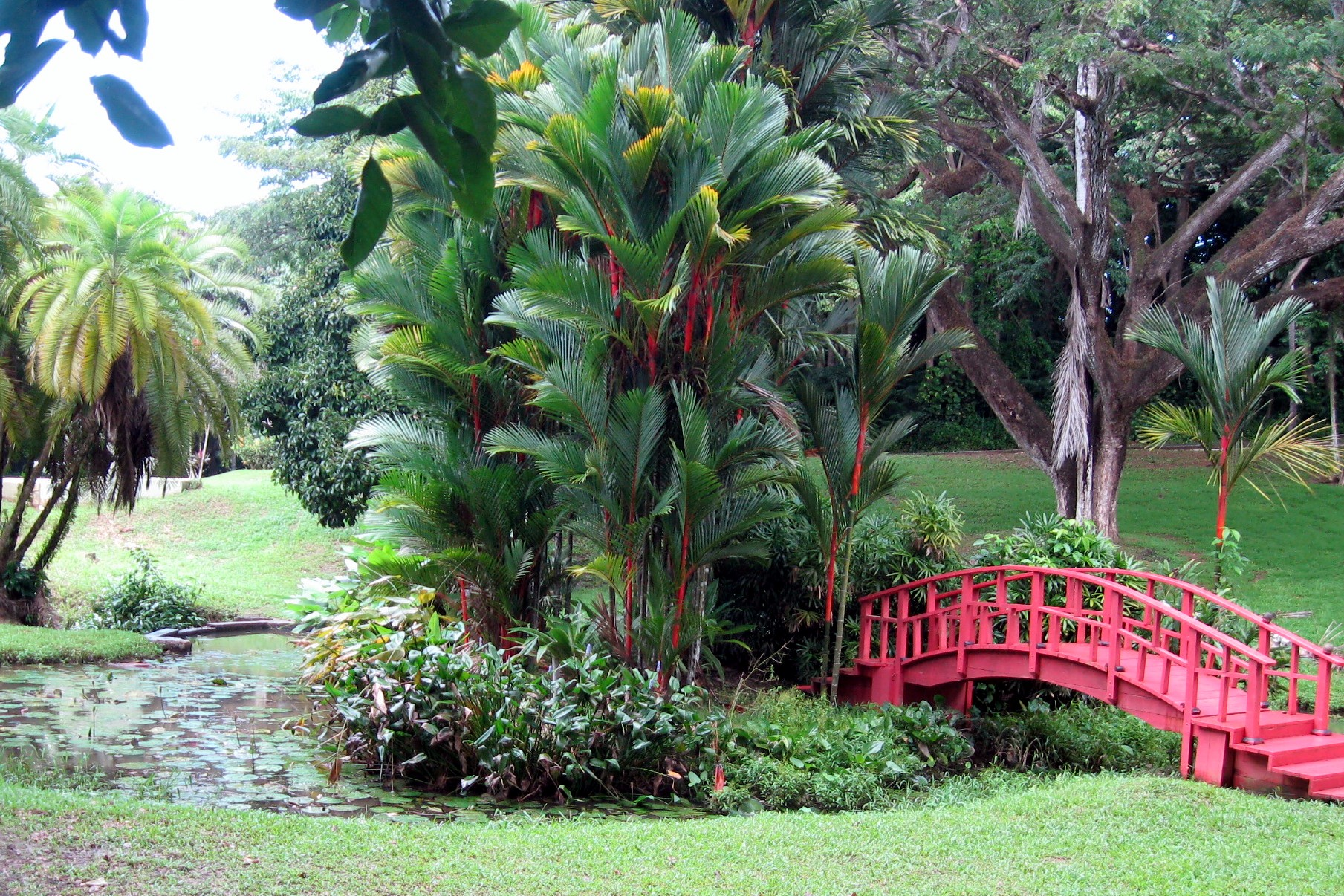
- The rare red sealing wax palm from Malaysia can be found in the Botanical Garden's Aquatic Garden.

- Location within Puerto Rico
- Type: Botanical Garden
- Location: San Juan, Puerto Rico
- Coordinates: 18.3898°N 66.0554°W
- Area: 300 acres (120 ha)
- Created: September 12, 1969

The San Juan Botanical Garden, officially known as the Botanical Garden of the University of Puerto Rico, is located in San Juan, the capital of Puerto Rico. This lush 300-acre (1.2 km^{2}) “urban garden” of native and exotic flora serves as a laboratory for the study, conservation and enrichment of plants, trees, flowers, grasses and many other plants. Seventy-five acres are landscaped and open to the general public as well as researchers.

The entrance is located off the south side of the intersection of Highway 1 and Road 847 in Río Piedras. The “Bosque Urbano del Nuevo Milenio” (Nuevo Milenio State Forest), a project for the conservation and growth of the urban forest, is on the eastern side of the Botanical Garden.

== Background ==
The botanical garden, proposed in 1959, was endorsed by the Council of Higher Education of Puerto Rico on September 12, 1969. On the initiative of Arturo Roque and supported by the president of the university, Dr. Jaime Benítez, the Botanical Garden was inaugurated on March 10, 1971.

Administratively, it functions as a part of the University of Puerto Rico, Mayagüez campus. Its international identification code is UPR. Fred Schaffner is the director.

The garden was partially opened to the public from 1971 until 1989. However, in the wake of Hurricane Hugo, the garden was closed for reconstruction until it could reopen for visitors in 1991. The garden's botanical collections, lakes, falls and shelters are well connected by paths, roads and walkways, allowing the visitor to know and better appreciate the value of native and tropical flora.

A Master Plan designated as the San Juan Ecological Corridor is underway which includes the development of public spaces, display exhibits, linkages for the new Tren Urbano with the University of Puerto Rico, the Nuevo Milenio State Forest, the Río Piedras River riparian zones, and its floodplain restoration.

== Collections ==
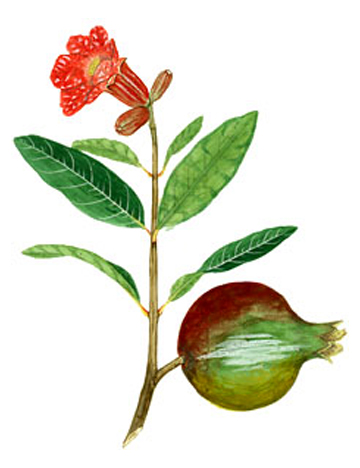
Dr. Agustín Stahl watercolor of Punica granatum.

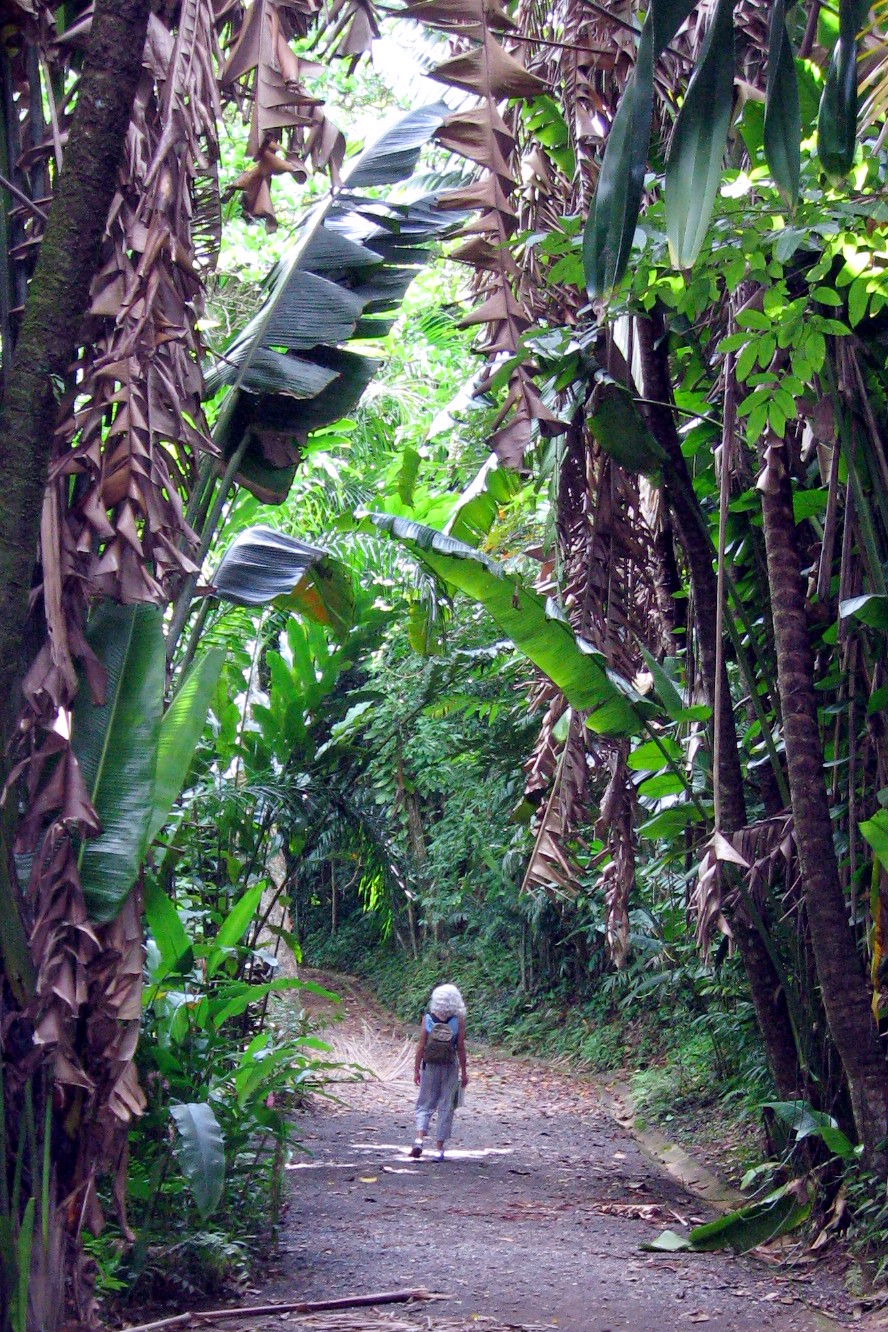
Nature trails at the Botanical Gardens.

The Botanic Garden exhibits several thematic collections comprising tropical and subtropical plants. It also exhibits a collection of modern sculptures by artists from Puerto Rico and Latin America.

- Garden of Heliconias. Brightly colored Heliconias native to tropical Americas. There is also a small group of Heliconias from Asia.
- Bamboo Chapel. A small chapel in a feathery bamboo forest.
- Orchid Garden. A grand selection of orchid species with a special collection of Cattleya.
- Monet's Garden. An adaptation of Monet's own aquatic garden in Giverny with its water lilies to the tropical milieu.
- Palmetum. Gathers over 125 species of palms.
- Aquatic Garden. Collection includes papyrus and red sealing wax palms.
- Taíno Garden. An arboretum with a collection of species of trees found locally that were useful in the daily life of the Taíno Indians.
- The Herbarium. A collection of over 36,000 specimens available for study and research by University of Puerto Rico students and researchers from other institutions in Puerto Rico, the Caribbean and other parts of the world. The new herbarium's facilities are being finished.

The Garden comprises a living laboratory for informal instruction of the community in all aspects of the native flora and the other plants which are cultivated there.

== Endangered native species ==
The endemic plants of Puerto Rico, including some which are threatened in the wild or in danger of extinction, are found in the northern part of the Garden. Here are the plants that the Puerto Rican botanist Agustín Stahl identified: * Argythamnia stahlii (Urb.) * Senna pendula var. stahlii (Urb.) Irwin & Barneby * Eugenia stahlii (Kiaersk.) Krug & (Urb.) * Lyonia stahlii (Urb.) * Ternstroemia stahlii (Krug & Urb.) The genus Stahlia is represented by a single species, Stahlia monosperma (Tul.) (Urb.), found in the wild only in Puerto Rico and the eastern Dominican Republic. This species, listed as endangered, is known in Puerto Rico under the name of cóbana negra.

== Affiliation ==
The San Juan Botanical Garden is an institutional member of the following professional organizations:

- American Association of Botanical Gardens and Arboreta (APGA)
- Center for Plant Conservation
- BGCI – Botanic Gardens Conservation International

== See also ==
- List of botanical gardens and arboretums in Puerto Rico
- List of endemic flora of Puerto Rico

== Bibliography ==
- James D. Ackerman and Maria Del Castillo, The Orchids of Puerto Rico and the Virgin Islands / Las Orquideas de Puerto Rico y Las Islas Virgenes – Text: English, Spanish – Editorial de la Universidad de Puerto Rico (1992) - ISBN 0-8477-2342-9
