= Guajataca State Forest =

State forest in Puerto Rico

Guajataca State Forest Spanish: Bosque Estatal de Guajataca
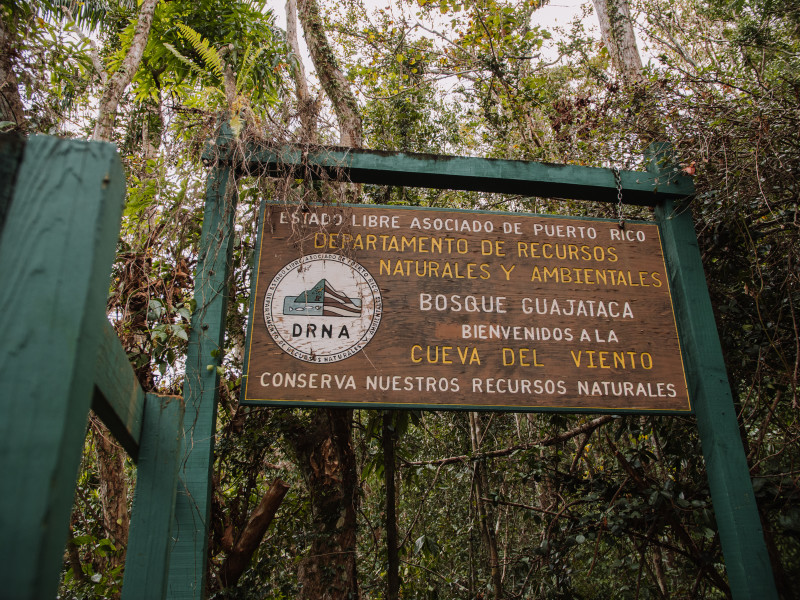

Map
- Interactive map of Guajataca State Forest

Geography
- Location: Isabela
- Coordinates: 18°24′53″N 66°58′28″W
- Elevation: 1,100 feet (340 m)
- Area: 2,357 cuerdas (2,289 acres)

Administration
- Status: Public, Commonwealth
- Governing body: Puerto Rico Department of Natural and Environmental Resources (DRNA)
- Website: www.drna.pr.gov

Ecology
- Ecosystem: Subtropical moist broadleaf forest

Guajataca State Forest (Spanish: Bosque Estatal de Guajataca) is one of the 20 forests that make up the public forest system of Puerto Rico. The Guajataca Forest is located in the northwestern part of Puerto Rico, along the Northern Karst zone in the municipality of Isabela and municipality of Quebradillas, and is near Camuy and San Sebastián. The forest is renowned for its ecological diversity, the mogotes and karstic formations, and its numerous caves and canyons. It also has the largest trail system of any Puerto Rican state forest.

== Geography ==
Guajataca State Forest is located in the middle of the karst landscape country, particularly the Northern Karst zone of Puerto Rico. A karst is a topographical zone formed by the dissolution of soluble porous rocks, in this case limestone, with features such as mogotes, canyons, caves, sinkholes, streams and rivers, all of which are common on this region of the island.

=== Climate ===
The forest has an average annual precipitation of 75 inches of rain a year. The average temperature is 76.5º F and the highest temperatures are usually reported during the months of July and August.

=== Geology ===
The soil of the forest is formed by limestone outcrops typical of tropical karst zones characterized by mogotes separated by geological sinks. The Forest of Guajataca lies in the girdle tertiary limestone of northwestern Puerto Rico. The Aymamón and Aguada limestone zones are found within the forest. The Aymamón limestone is characterized by sub-conical hills called mogotes while the Aguada limestone is characterized by its caves.

== History ==
The forest preserve dates to 1943 when the Puerto Rico Reconstruction Administration set the area aside for the purpose of preserving the flora and fauna of the karstic region. The forest was included in the 1975 proclamation of Law 133 which adds further protection to the forests in the state forest system. The forest is now managed by the Puerto Rico Department of Natural and Environmental Resources (DRNA).

== Ecology ==
The vegetation of the forest is split into two zones: the montane vegetation found in the mogotes and steepest parts of the forest (76% of the forest area) and the lowland vegetation found along the valleys and flatter areas (24% of the forest area).

=== Flora ===
There are more than 186 tree species found in the forest, out of which 156 are native, 7 are introduced and 40 are endemic to Puerto Rico. Some of the endemic tree species are the ceboruquillo (Thouinia striata) and the so called macho cedar (Hieronyma clusioides). Other common species of forest are the bullet tree (Terminalia buceras), the Spanish elm (Cordia alliodora) and the white indigo berry (Randia aculeata).

=== Fauna ===
Due to the large number of caves found in the karstic areas, the forest is home to numerous bat species, most notably the Jamaican fruit bat (Artibeus jamaicensis) which is very common in the region. The endangered Puerto Rican boa (Epicrates inornatus) is also found in the forest. There are more than 70 bird species, out of which 26 are native, 26 are migratory and 12 are endemic to the island. Some of the most common endemic species are the Puerto Rican woodpecker (Melanerpes portoricencis), the Puerto Rican tody (Todus mexicanus), the Puerto Rican screech owl (Otus nudipes), the Puerto Rican vireo (Vireo latimeri), the Puerto Rican flycatcher (Myiarchus antillarum), the Puerto Rican bullfinch (Loxigilla portoricensis), the Puerto Rican spindalis (Spindalis portoricensis) and Adelaide's warbler (Setophaga adelaidae). Guajataca State Forest, as part of the Northern Karst Belt, was recognized as an Important Bird Area by BirdLife International in 2007.

== Cueva del Viento ==
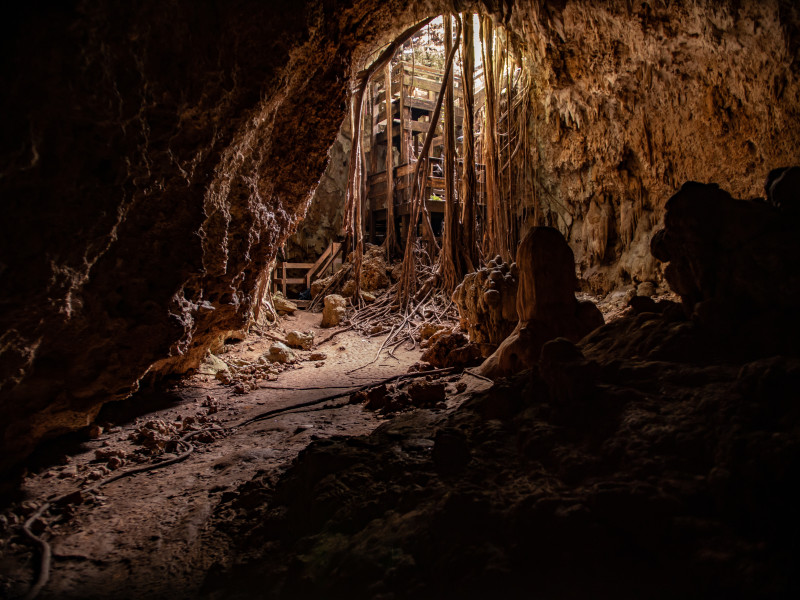
View of the entrance to the caves

The Cueva del Viento or Cave of the Wind is a cave found within the forest that is often considered the highlight of the reserve for visitors. The entrance to the cave is down 40 steps and strong flashlights are required to visit as the cave has no lighting installed due to the presence of cavern wildlife. The cave is often muddy and slippery due to the frequent rain and waters that flows through the karstic zone and even if there are hand railings through the cave visitors must be cautious about where they walk. Although the entrance area of the cave has been broken-off by past visitors it still contains numerous interesting geological formations including stalagmites and stalactites. The caverns are home to numerous bat species and bat colonies so visitors must be cautious not to disturb them while visiting the cave.

== Recreation ==
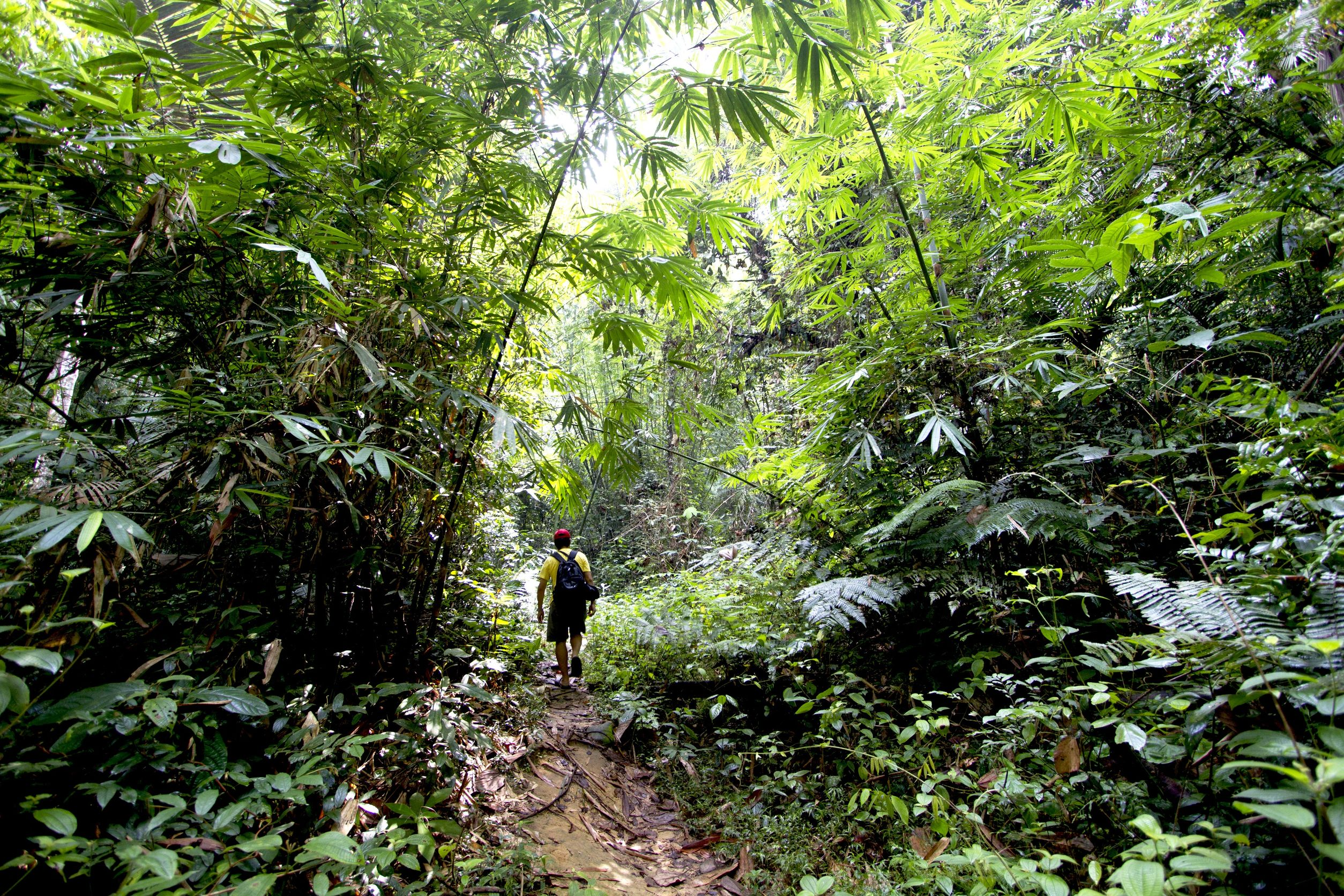
One of the many trails in the forest

The forest is located about 2 hours from San Juan and about 1 hour from Rincón. It can be accessed through PR-446 highway in Isabela. In addition to Cueva de Viento the forest has the infrastructure for camping, picnics and more than 44 km of hiking trails. Camping in the forest is $4 a night for adults and $2 a night for children, and camping spaces must be reserved in advance through the Puerto Rico Department of Natural Resources. There is no admission fee for visiting or hiking in the forest.

=== Hiking ===
Guajataca Forest contains the largest trail system of any forest in Puerto Rico, including El Yunque National Forest. Most of the trails begin by the ranger station, which also hosts an information center although it is not always open and it is recommended to call the rangers' office beforehand. The most popular hike is the 1.5-mile Interpretative Trail (Vereda Interpretativa) which leads to an observation tower that offer some of the best views of the karstic countryside. Trail #1 starts off the Interpretative Trail and leads to the Cueva de Viento, the park's most popular geographical feature.

=== Guajataca Lake ===
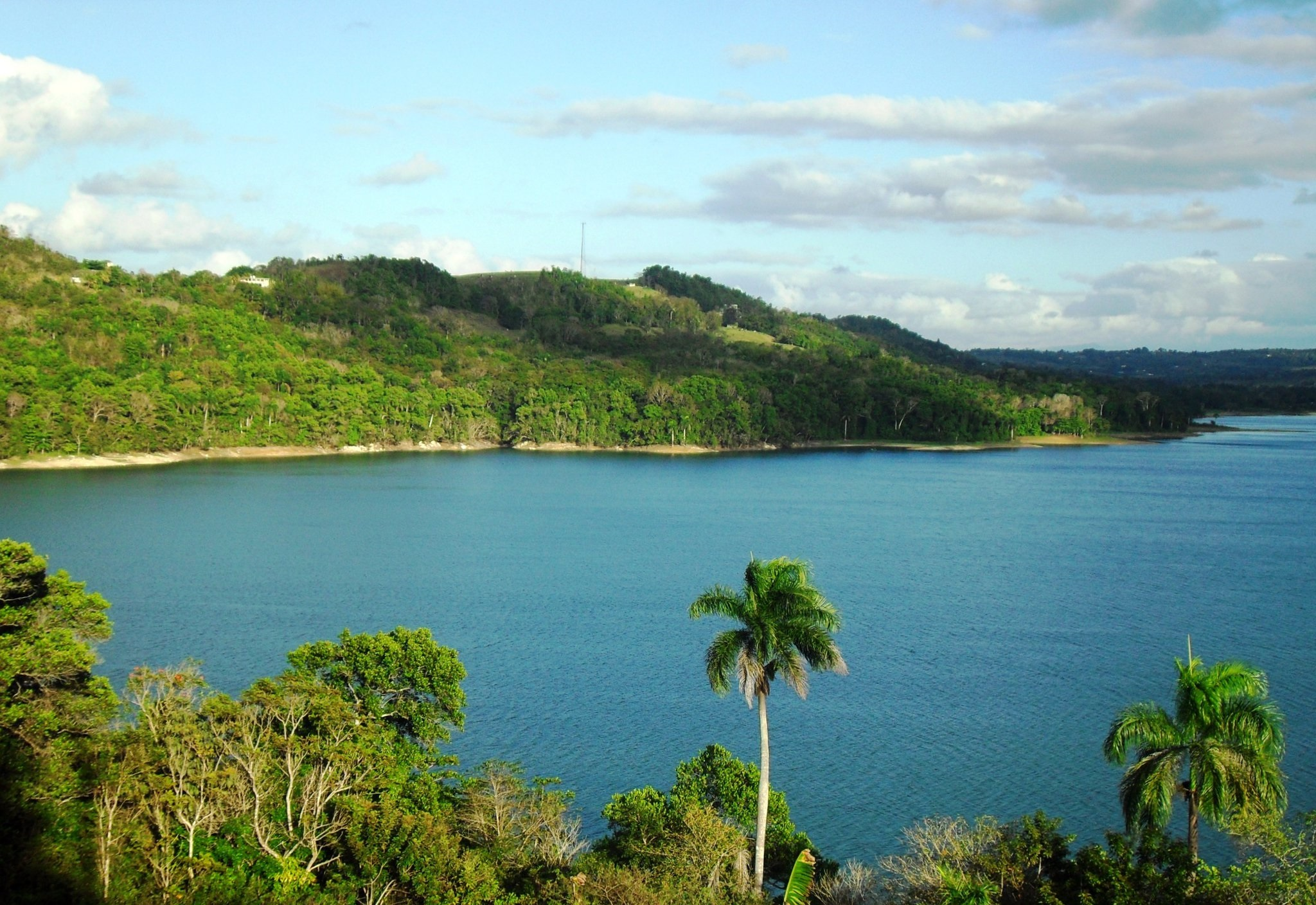
Guajataca Lake

Guajataca Lake is a reservoir of the Guajataca River located in close proximity to the forest. The lake is located in the boundary between the municipalities of Isabela, Quebradillas and San Sebastián. The camping areas and fishing facilities found by the lake are often confused with the Guajataca State Forest or incorrectly associated with it even if they are outside of the forest boundaries. The lake area is nonetheless a very popular camping, kayaking and fishing spot in the region and some of its facilities are also managed by the Puerto Rico Department of Natural and Environmental Resources.

== See also ==
- List of state forests of Puerto Rico
- Puerto Rico Northern Karst
