= San Patricio State Forest =

Forest in San Juan, Puerto Rico

Coordinates: 18.40922°N 66.09307°W

San Patricio State Forest Spanish: Bosque Estatal de San Patricio Bosque Urbano de San Patricio
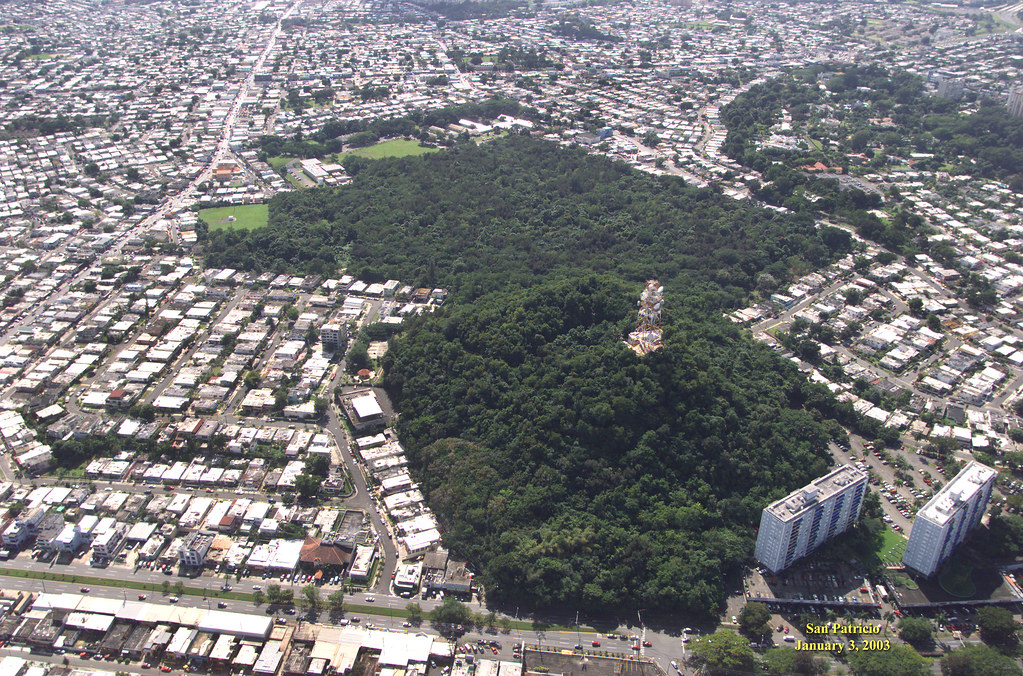
- Aerial view of the forest. Photo by Carlos D. Orduña Zequeira of the Polytechnic University of Puerto Rico, 2003.
- Interactive map of San Patricio State Forest

Geography
- Location: San Juan, Puerto Rico
- Elevation: 164 feet (50 m)
- Area: 70 cuerdas (68 acres)

Administration
- Authority: Puerto Rico DRNA
- Website: www.bosquesanpatricio.org

Ecology
- Ecosystem: Second-growth Subtropical Moist Zone forest
- WWF Classification: Puerto Rican moist forests

San Patricio State Forest (Spanish: Bosque Estatal de San Patricio), also known as the San Patricio Urban Forest (Spanish: Bosque Urbano de San Patricio) is one of the 20 forests that make up the public forest system of Puerto Rico. This is a secondary or second-growth forest is located in the Gobernador Piñero district of San Juan, between the neighborhoods of Villa Borinquen, Caparra Heights and Borinquen Towers complex. The urban forest has entrances on Roosevelt Avenue and Ensenada Street. The forest extends to almost 70 acres and it is the smallest protected area in the Puerto Rico state forest system. One of the most distinctive features of the forest is the mogote on its northern edge which can be observed from many parts of San Juan and Guaynabo. The forest is part of the Northern Karst.

== History ==
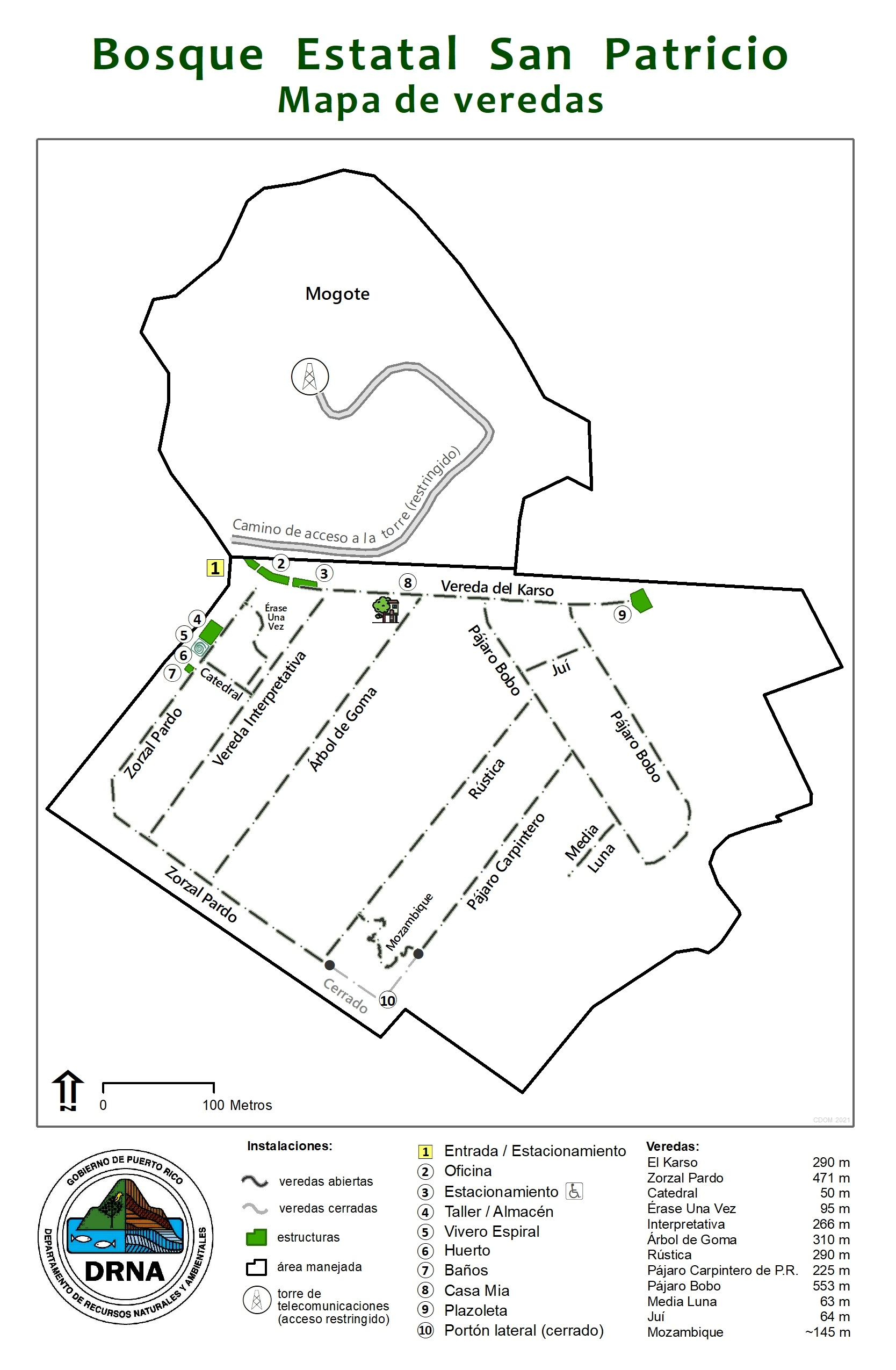
Map of the forest published by the DRNA.

The site of the forest was first developed for agriculture and cattle grazing and used to be a farm called Finca San Patricio. There used to be three mogotes on the site but two were destroyed to make way for the construction of the Villa Borinquen neighborhood and the Borinquen Towers complex. The third mogote still exists and it hosts a communications tower. The rest of the land was originally acquired by the US Army with the intention of developing residences for nearby Fort Buchanan. In 1962 the city of San Juan was experiencing a population boom and urban sprawl destroyed much of the original forest areas of the region. The area where the forest is located was not spared as if it was cleared to make way for more neighborhoods, and the only part of the forest to remain relatively untouched was that around the only remaining mogote. In 1960, the army left and abandoned the residences there and from 1974 to 1999 most of those residences were demolished. At the time the land was owned by the governmental Corporation for Housing and Urban Development (Spanish: Corporación de Renovación Urbana y Vivienda) or CRUV (today known as the Puerto Rico Department of Housing) and the land was intended to be developed to build housing of social interest but these were never built and the modern forest started to grow in the abandoned land. The area was considered one of the last green zones in San Juan and as such in 1998 the environmentalist group Ciudadanos Pro Bosque San Patricio, along with scientists and local residents, pushed to have the land be proclaimed a forest preserve. On August 3, 2000, the forest is proclaimed through an executive order and granted to the Puerto Rico Department of Natural and Environmental Resources (DRNA) to manage and preserve the secondary forest and its ecology. The goal of this proclamation is to preserve the forest for the purpose of recreation and scientific research. After being closed due to the destruction caused by Hurricane Maria in 2017, the forest has recently been revitalized and it re-opened in April of 2021.

== Geology ==
There are three kinds of geological units in the forest: alluvial fan deposits composed of red-colored sandy and silty clay, watered limestone composed of calcarenite and chalky limestone rock which is very common in the Northern Karst of Puerto Rico, and the unit representative of the fossil-rich Cibao Formation composed of chalk, soft limestone rock, and sandy clay.

== Ecology ==
=== Flora ===
The forest is home to about 70 species of trees, all of which are of secondary growth. Some of the most common trees are the flamboyant (Delonix regia) from Madagascar, the pink trumpet tree or Puerto Rican oak (Tabebuia heterophyll) and the invasive African tulip tree (Spathodea campanulata). Due to its secondary origin, most of the plant species in the forest are of exotic origin, although the species found in higher areas such as in the mogote are native to Puerto Rico. Some endangered or threatened native species have been introduced to the forest for the purpose of their conservation; some of these species are the elegant goetzea or matabuey (Goetzea elegans) and the Puerto Rican manac (Calyptronoma rivalis), both of which have successfully adapted to the forest.

=== Fauna ===
The forest is good for birdwatching as it is home to at least 33 bird species, 9 of which are endemic to Puerto Rico: the Puerto Rican bullfinch (Loxigilla portoricencis), the Puerto Rican screech owl (Otus nudipe), the Puerto Rican woodpecker (Melanerpes portoricencis), the Puerto Rican oriole (Icterus portoricensis), the Puerto Rican flycatcher (Myiarchus antillarum), the Puerto Rican spindalis (Spindalis portoricencis), the Adelaide's warbler (Setophaga adelaidae), the Puerto Rican vireo (Vireo latimeri) and the green mango hummingbird (Anthracothorax viridis).

Three species of coqui occur in the forest: the common coqui (Electherodactylus coqui), the whistling coqui (Electherodactylus cochranae) and the red-eyed coqui or churi (Eleutherodactylus antillensis). Other amphibian species commonly found in the forest are the white-lipped frog (Leptodactylus albilabris) and the invasive cane toad (Rhinella marina). Reptiles such as the Puerto Rican racer (Borikenophis portoricensis), the Puerto Rican ground lizard (Pholidoscelis exsul), the crested anole (Anolis cristatellus) and the Puerto Rican anole (Anolis pulchellus). The Puerto Rican boa, which is endangered and endemic to the island, can also be found in the forest.

== Recreation ==
The forest has infrastructure for visitors with an information center, parking, handicap access, bathrooms, gazebos for picnics, a plant nursery and various interpretative trails with information about the forest's wildlife. It is a good place for birdwatching and educational tours about the various scientific research projects that are conducted in the area. Biking is allowed in the forest. The forest also hosts occasional educational and environmental events. It is open to visitors by appointment only (787-268-5353, 787-707-0730) from 7:30 a.m. to 4:00 p.m. on weekdays and from 8:00 a.m. to 4:30 p.m. on weekends. There is no admission fee.

== See also ==
- List of state forests in Puerto Rico
- Nuevo Milenio State Forest
- Puerto Rico Northern Karst
