= Julio Enrique Monagas Park =

State park and recreational area in Bayamón, Puerto Rico

- Parque Nacional Julio Enrique Monagas
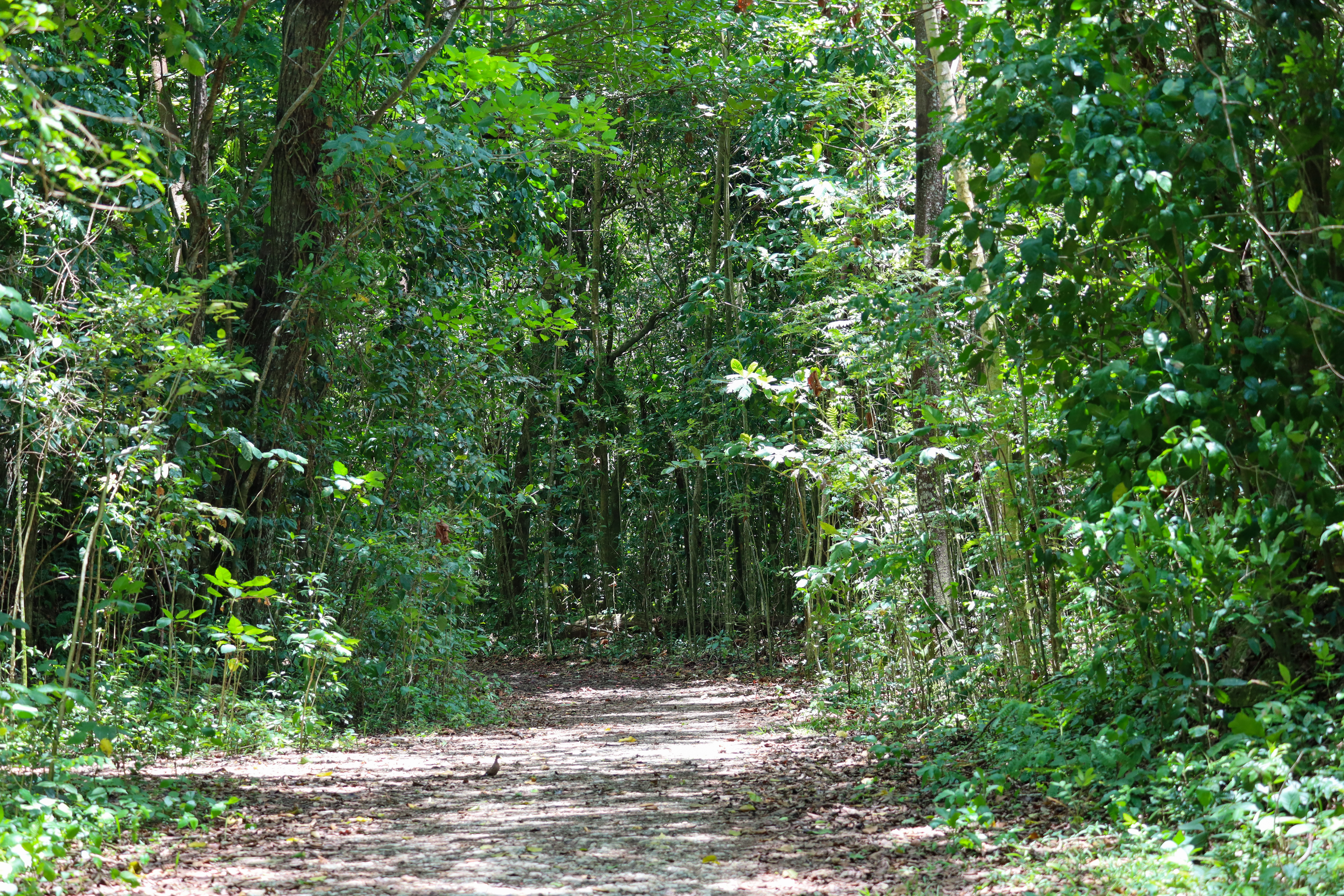
- Sendero Miradero
- Interactive map of Julio Enrique Monagas Park
- Location: Juan Sánchez, Bayamón, Puerto Rico
- Area: 200 acres (81 ha)
- Established: 1993
- Governing body: Compañía de Parques Nacionales de Puerto Rico, PRDNER

Julio Enrique Monagas Park (Spanish: Parque Julio Enrique Monagas, sometimes referred to as Julio Enrique Monagas National Park or Parque nacional Julio Enrique Monagas) is an urban state park and recreational area located in Bayamón, Puerto Rico. The park is named after Julio Enrique Monagas, the first director of Puerto Rico's Public Recreation and Parks Commission and also considered the father of the Olympic movement in Puerto Rico. The park is managed by the Compañía de Parques Nacionales de Puerto Rico, which serves as the department of parks and recreation of the territory, although everyday management is done by the Interamerican University of Puerto Rico's Centro Ambiental Santa Ana, established by Frank H. Wadsworth in 2006.

== Geography ==
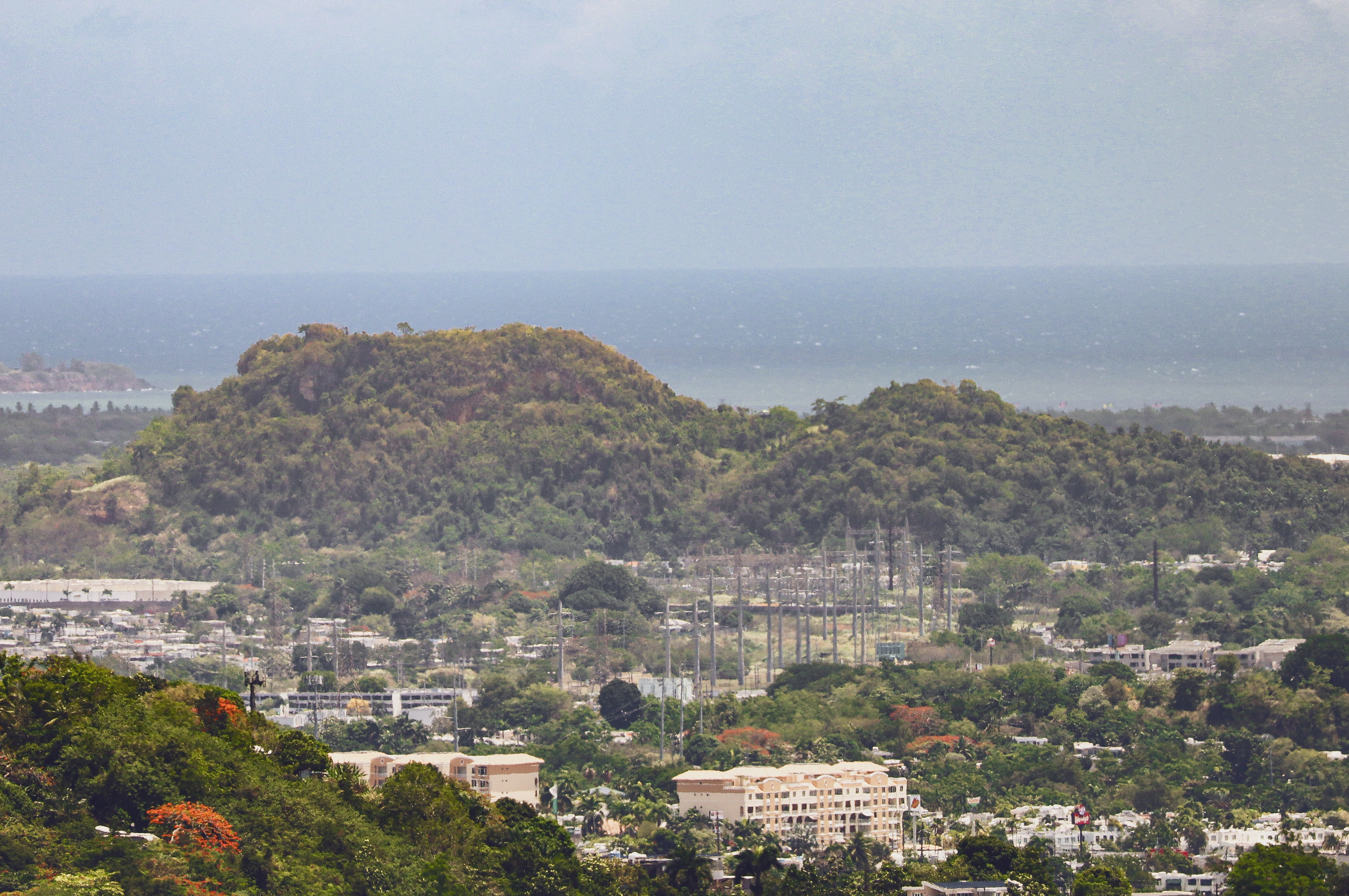
View of Monte de Santa Ana mogotes from Mamey, Guaynabo.

The park is centered around an outcrop of the Northern Karst belt of Puerto Rico, particularly a ridge of mogotes or limestone hills known as Monte de Santa Ana that rise westwardly along northeastern Bayamón, close to the municipal boundary with Guaynabo. The protected area of the park is bound by the west by the Bayamón River, and to the east by Fort Buchanan.

== History ==
Before its establishment in 1993, the area was a part military installation for nearby Fort Buchanan during the Second World War, and many of the bunkers and ammunition warehouses are still preserved within the area. The park today contains several hiking trails, paths for mountain biking, playgrounds for children, gazebos for picnics, and areas for horse-riding. Climbing is also allowed in some of the mogotes.

== Ecology ==
The protected natural area within the park acts as an urban oasis within the San Juan metropolitan area. The park is the home to animal species such as monarch butterflies, Adelaide's warblers, flower bats, Puerto Rican flycatchers, and Puerto Rican boas. The karstic hills here further support the hydrological basin of the San Juan estuary.

== Gallery ==
Wildlife

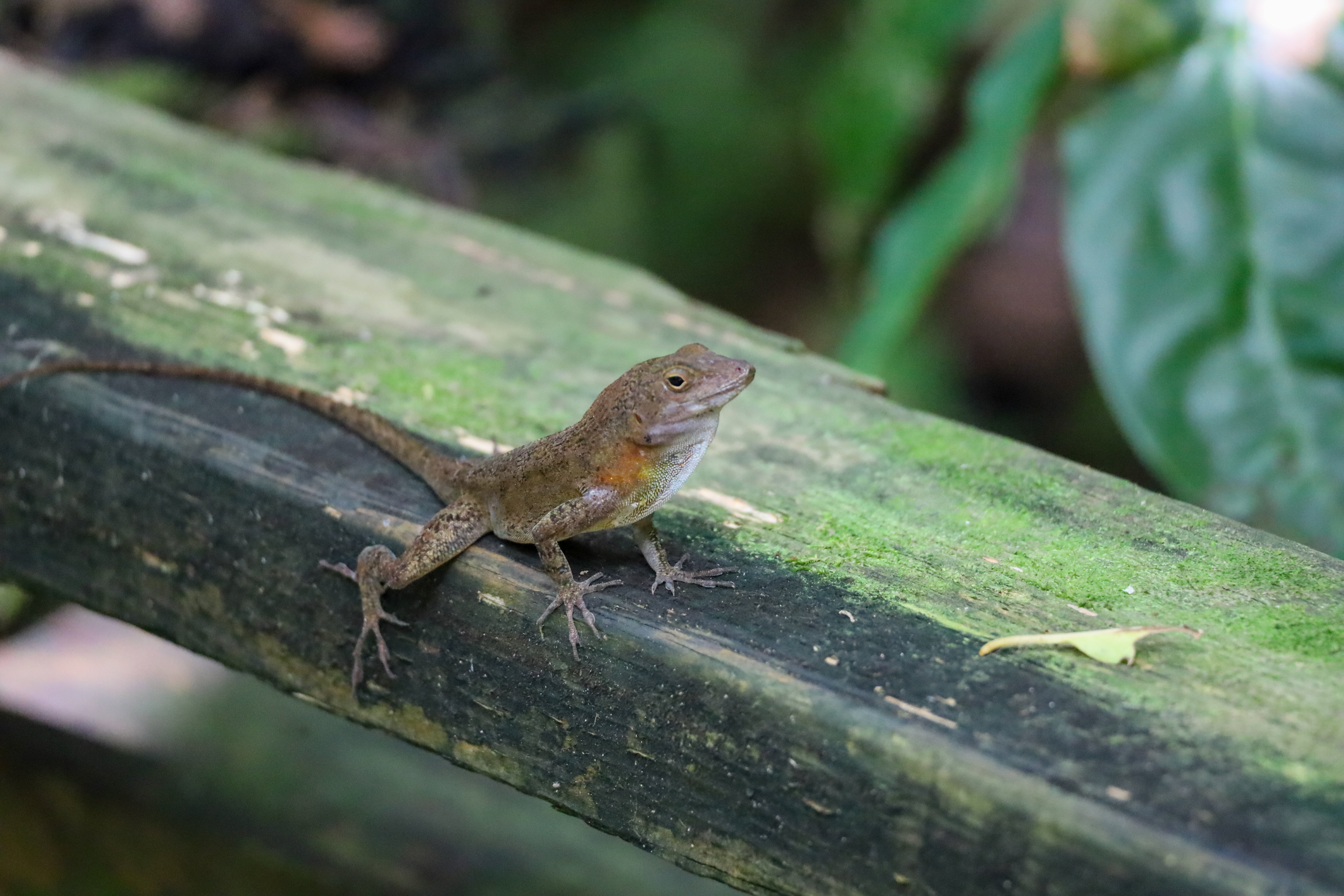
Crested anole (Anolis cristatellus)

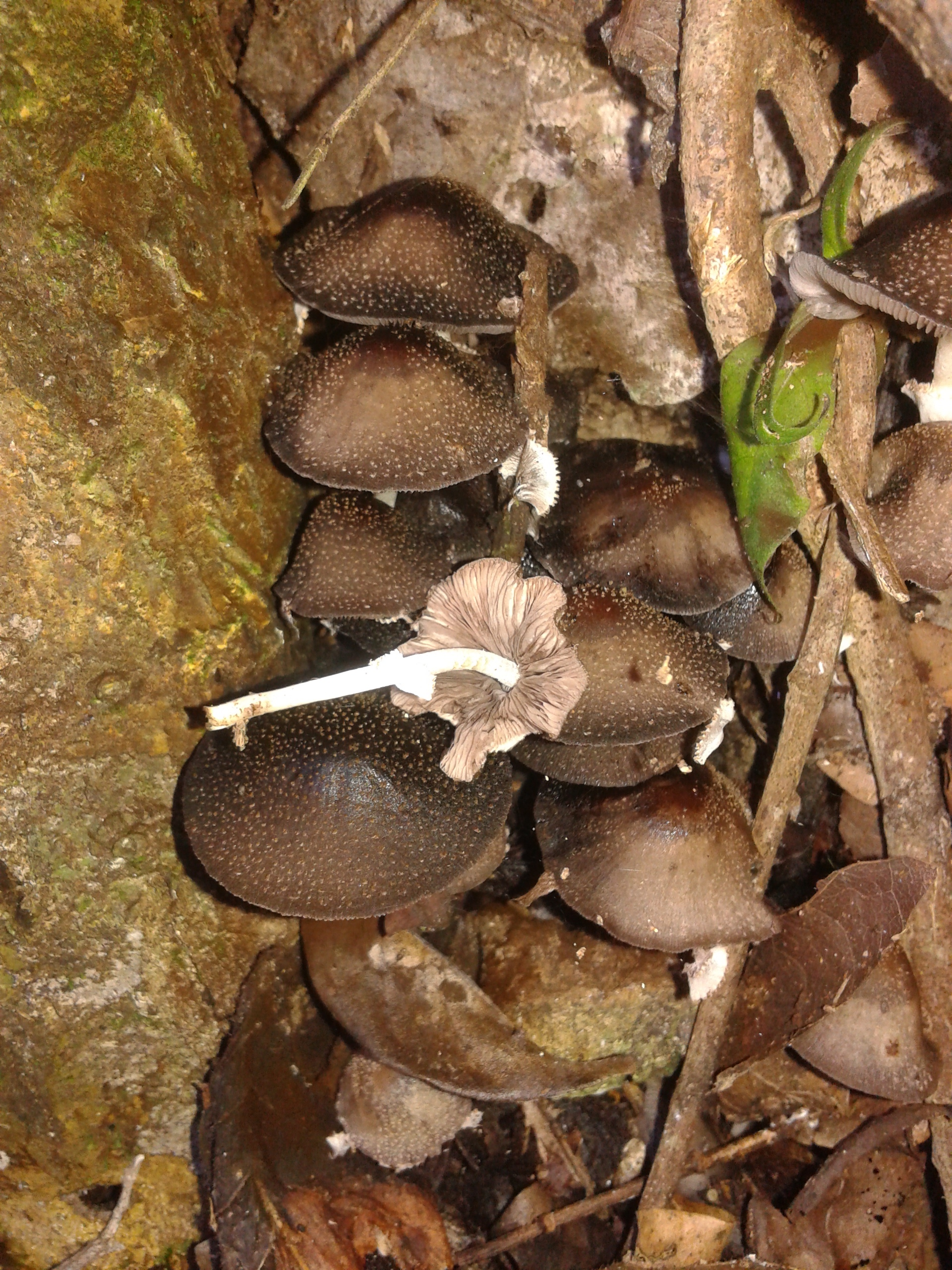
Candolleomyces tuberculatus

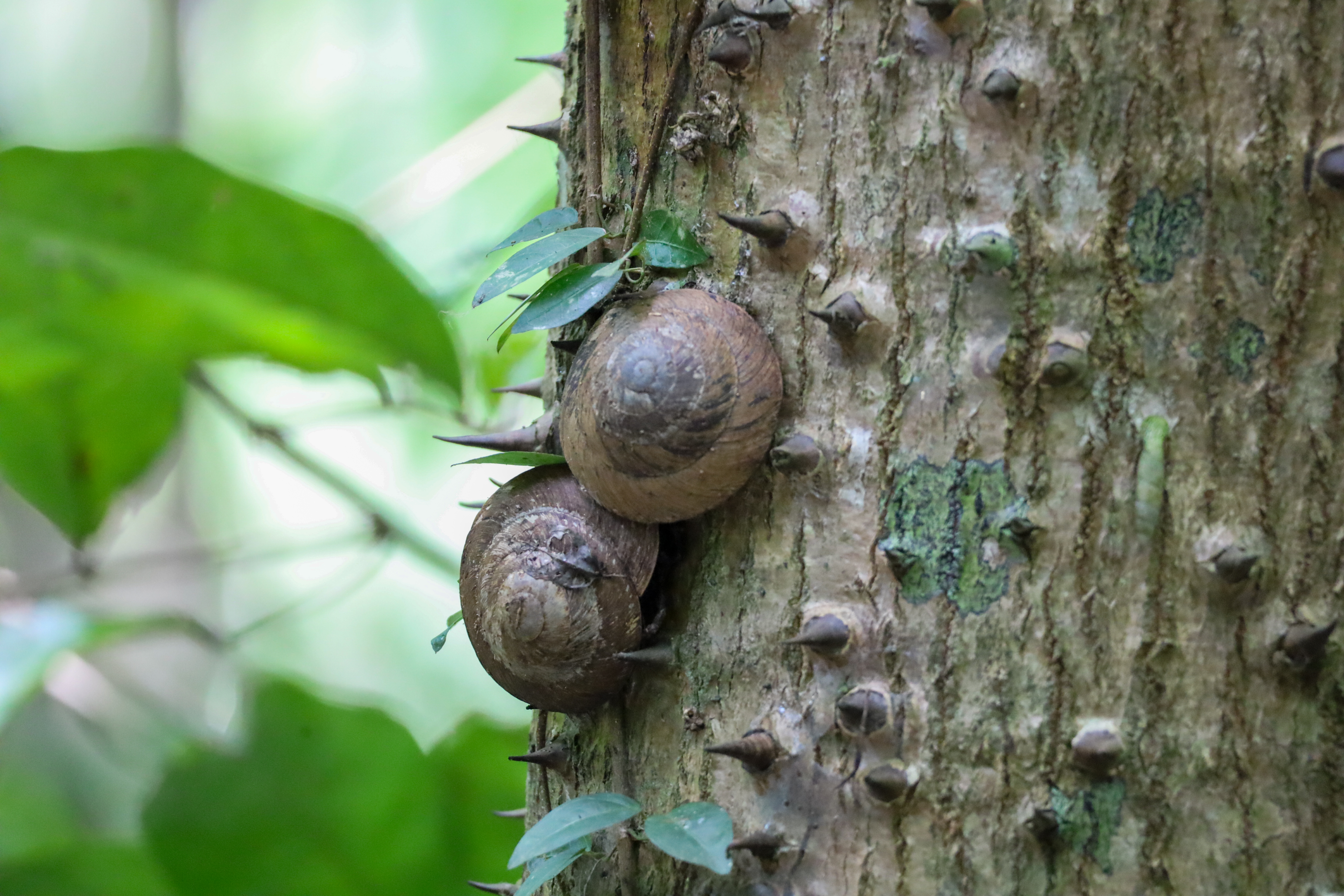
Puerto Rican tree snail (Caracolus caracolla) on a jabillo (Hura crepitans)

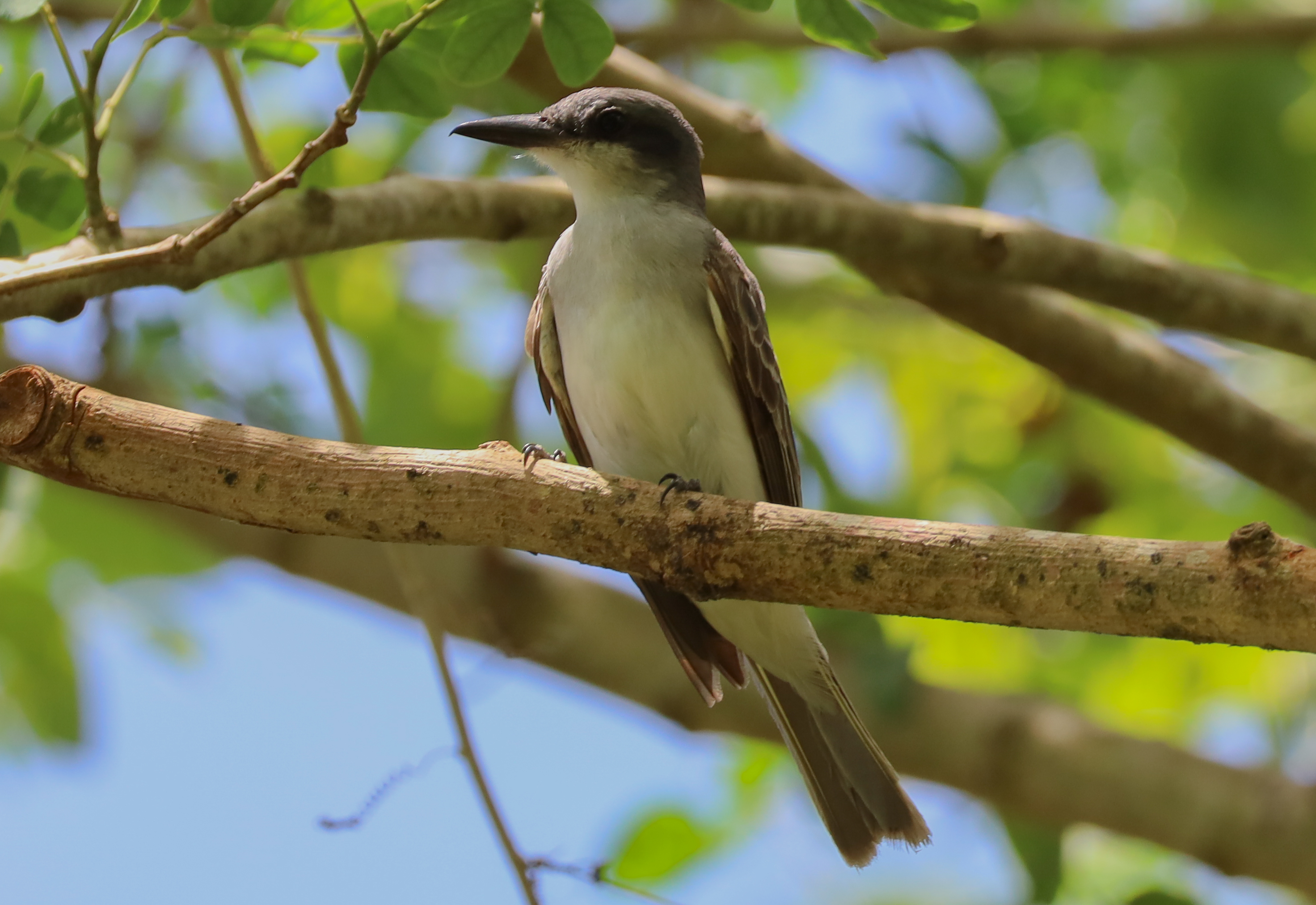
Gray kingbird (Tyrannus dominicensis)

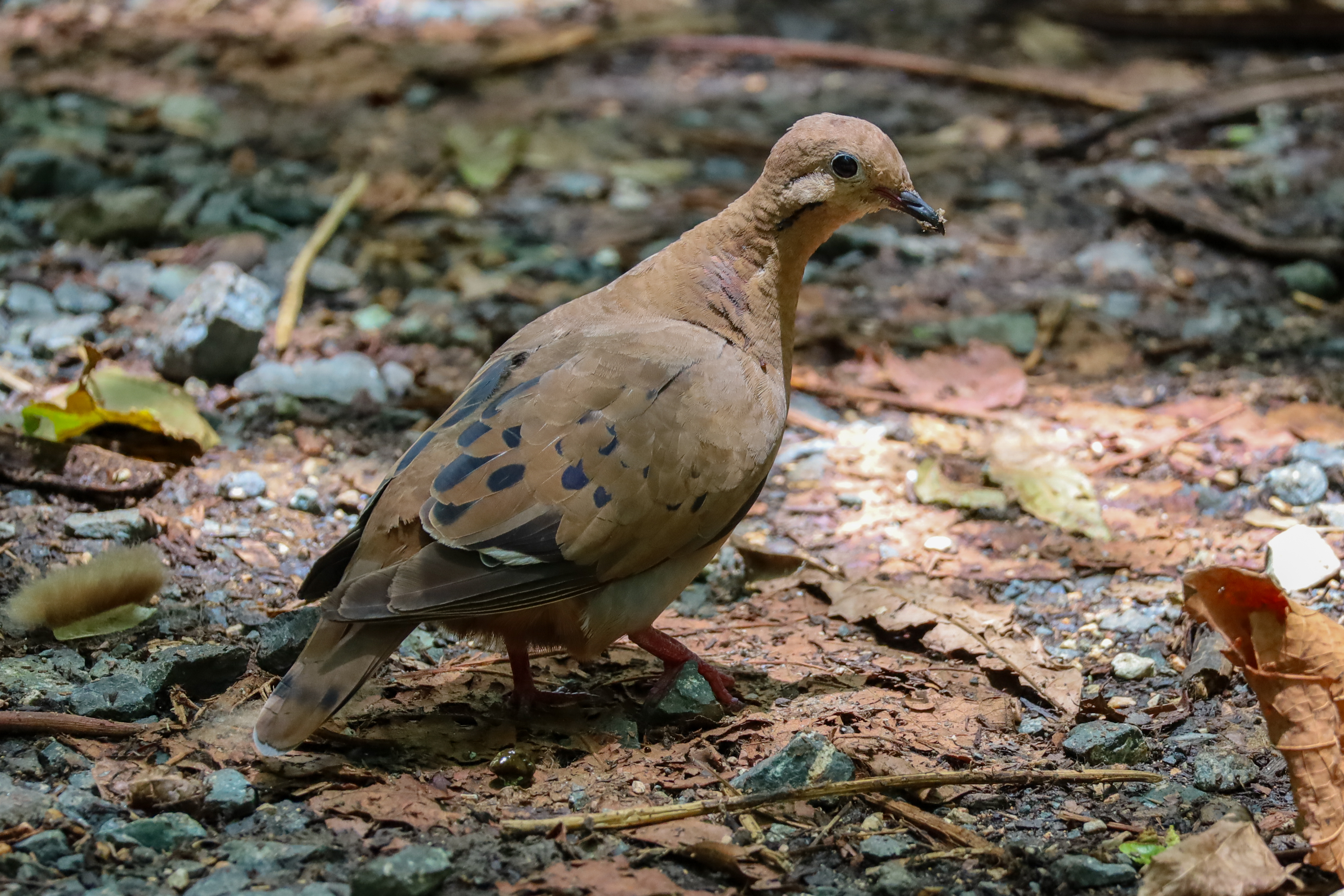
Zenaida dove (Zenaida aurita)
