= Northern Karst Belt =

Limestone karst landscape located in the northern part of Puerto Rico

Mogotes in the Northern Karst Belt from Barceloneta in Puerto Rico.

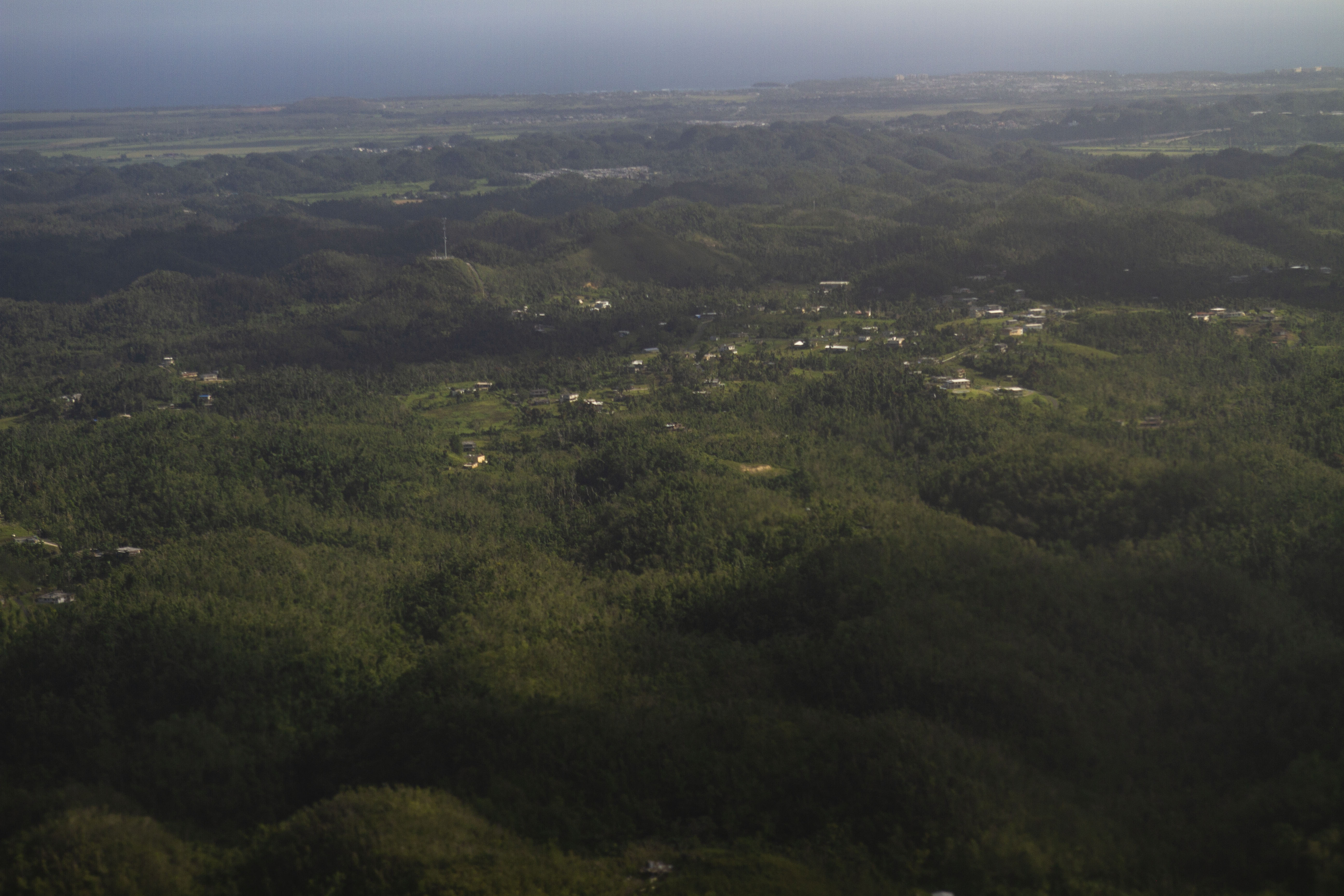
Mogotes in the Northern Karst Belt of Puerto Rico.

The Northern Karst Belt (Spanish: Cinturón del Carso Norteño) is a limestone karst landscape located along the northern coast of Puerto Rico, roughly between the municipalities of Loíza in the San Juan metropolitan area in the northeast and Aguada in the northwest. A karst is a topographical zone formed by the dissolution of soluble porous rocks, such as limestone, with features such as mogotes, canyons, caves, sinkholes, streams and rivers, all of which are common on this region of the island. Some of the island's main rivers, including its longest (La Plata River), traverse the karst and form some of the most distinctive Puerto Rican geographical features such as the Camuy caverns. Many of these rivers feed into and are important in the formation of many marshy areas such as the Caño Tiburones wetlands.

== Notable features ==
=== Mogotes ===
A mogote (English: /məˈɡoʊti/, Spanish: /moˈgote/) is an isolated hill with steep, almost vertical, walls that are completely or partially surrounded by alluvial plains. These hills are a characteristic feature of northern Puerto Rico and they can be seen along the north coast from Aguadilla and Rincón in the west to Canóvanas in the east. The highest mogote in the Northern Karst is Cerro El Sombrero in Isabela, Puerto Rico at 1,069 feet (326 m) of elevation. Some renown mogote areas are the town of Florida, located on an alluvial valley completely surrounded by them, and the Arecibo Telescope which was built into a natural sinkhole surrounded by mogotes in Arecibo. The San Patricio State Forest is partially located on the Mogote de San Patricio in San Juan and mogotes can also be seen at the Julio Enrique Monagas Park in Bayamon.

=== Arecibo Valley ===
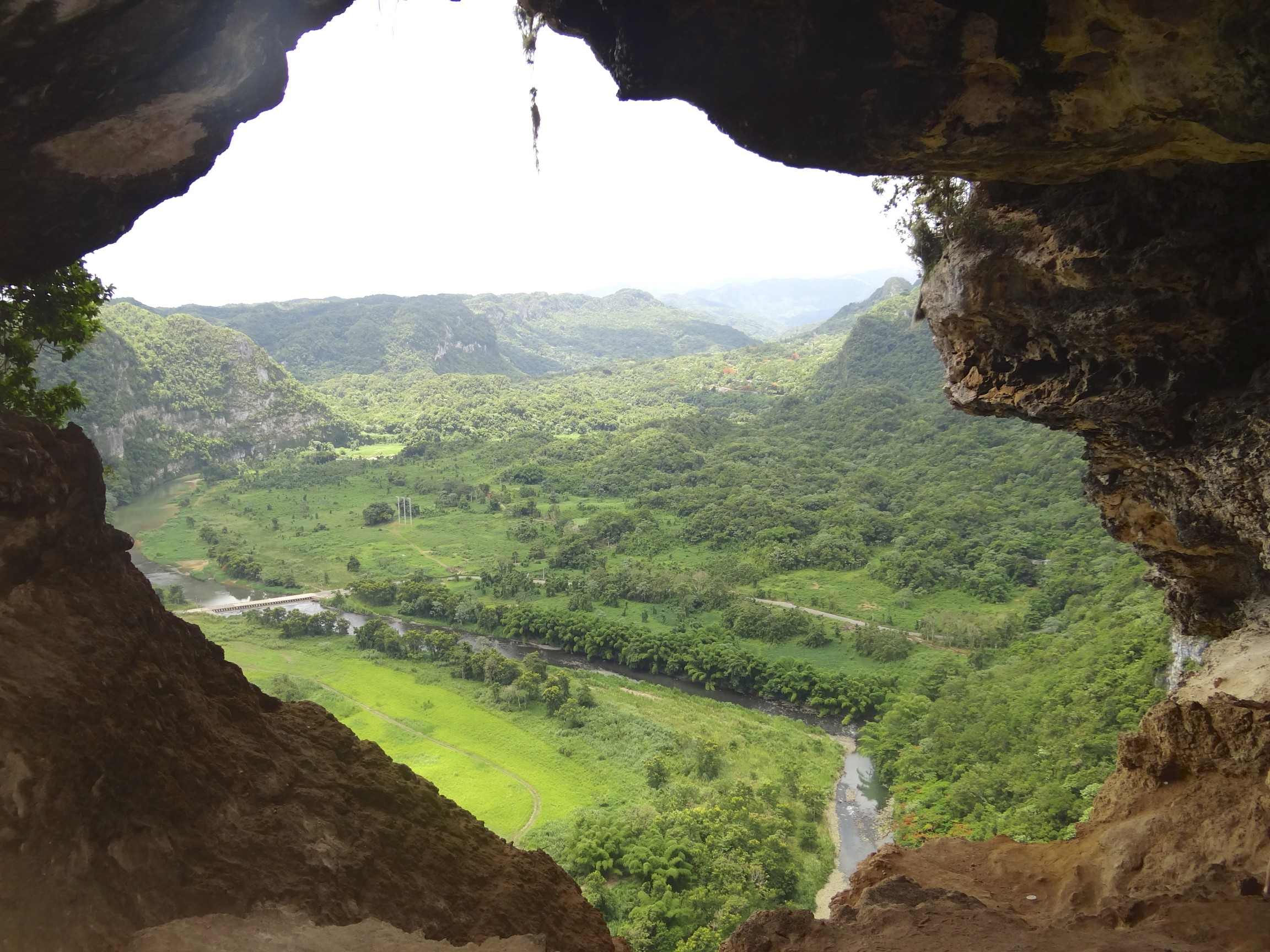
View of the Arecibo Valley from Cueva Ventana.

The Arecibo River flows through a wide alluvial canyon called the Arecibo Valley (Spanish: Valle de Arecibo). Highway PR-10 runs from north to south parallelly to the canyon and it provides access to Cueva Ventana, a cave located on one of its cliffs. Many important tributaries of the Arecibo River, such as the Tanamá and Caonillas Rivers, flow into the canyon. Dos Bocas Lake is a reservoir located in the southern edge of the valley. The Río Abajo State Forest is located nearby.

=== Camuy Canyon and Caverns ===
The Camuy Canyon (Spanish: Cañón del Río Camuy) is formed by the Camuy River, which flows from the cave system of the same name in the south. The canyon also constitutes the border between the municipalities of Camuy and Hatillo. Other caves in the area are Cueva Espiral and Cueva Catedral. The Tres Pueblos sinkhole is also located nearby.

=== Guajataca Valley ===
The Guajataca River flows into the Atlantic passing through a canyon called the Guajataca Valley (Spanish: Valle de Guajataca), between the municipalities of Isabela and Quebradillas. The Guajataca State Forest is located along the western edge of the valley.

== Ecology ==
The karst region of Puerto Rico holds the most extensive forest canopy cover on the island due to its rugged topography; the Northern Karst is considered of high potential for recovery of endangered species, including the Puerto Rican parrot (Amazona vittata). This area has the highest biodiversity in the island with 1,300 species of plants and animals, including 30 federally listed threatened and endangered species.

=== Protected natural areas in the Northern karst ===
- Cambalache State Forest in Arecibo and Barceloneta
- Guajataca State Forest in Isabela
- Río Abajo State Forest in Arecibo and Utuado
- San Patricio State and Urban Forest in San Juan
- Vega State Forest in Vega Alta and Vega Baja
- Camuy River Caves Park in Camuy, Hatillo and Lares
- Julio Enrique Monagas Park in Bayamón
- Manatí Research Area in Manatí
- Mata de Plátano Field Station and Nature Reserve in Arecibo

== Gallery ==
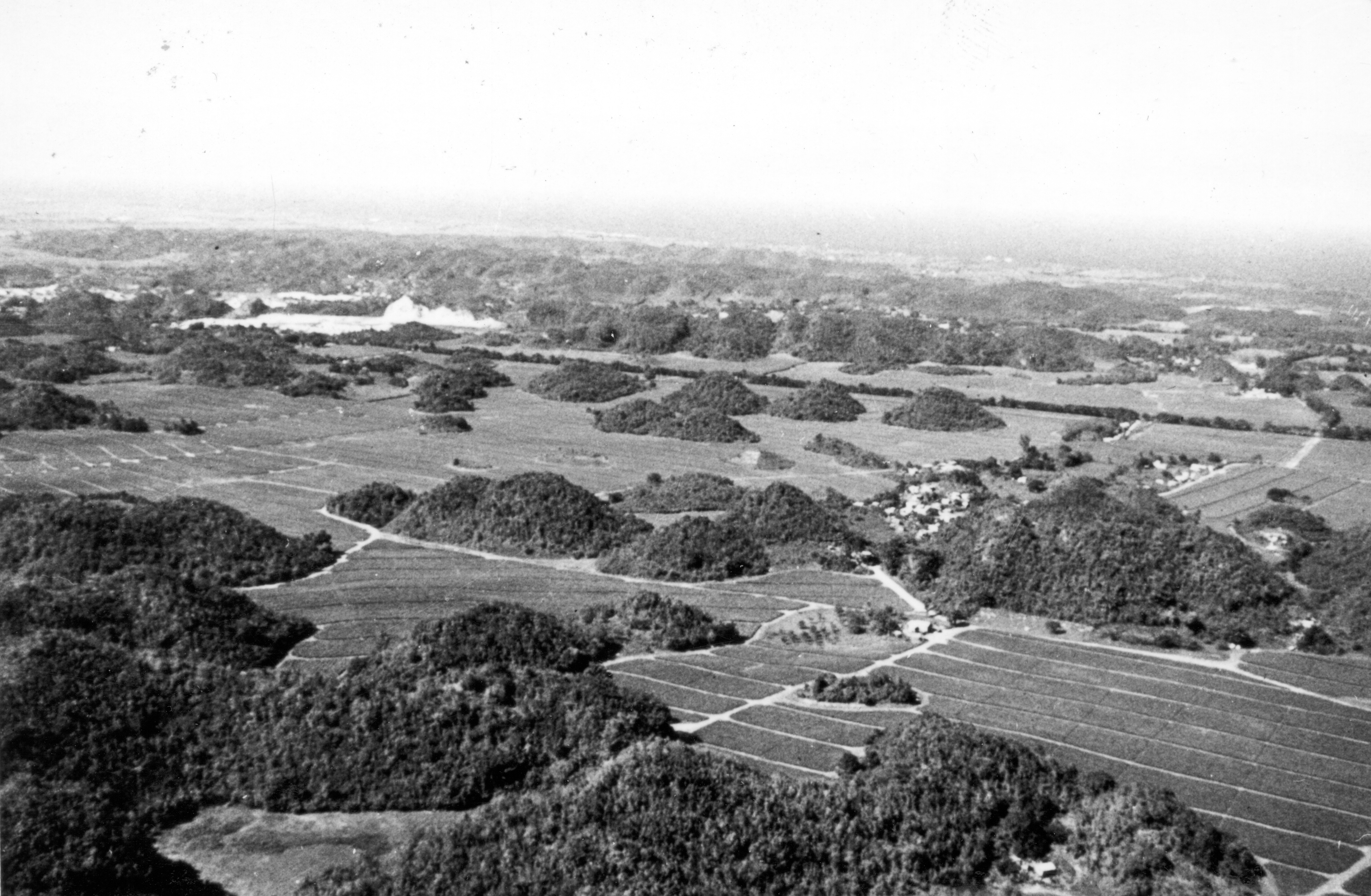
Historical photo showing mogotes near Coto Sur in the Northern Karst.

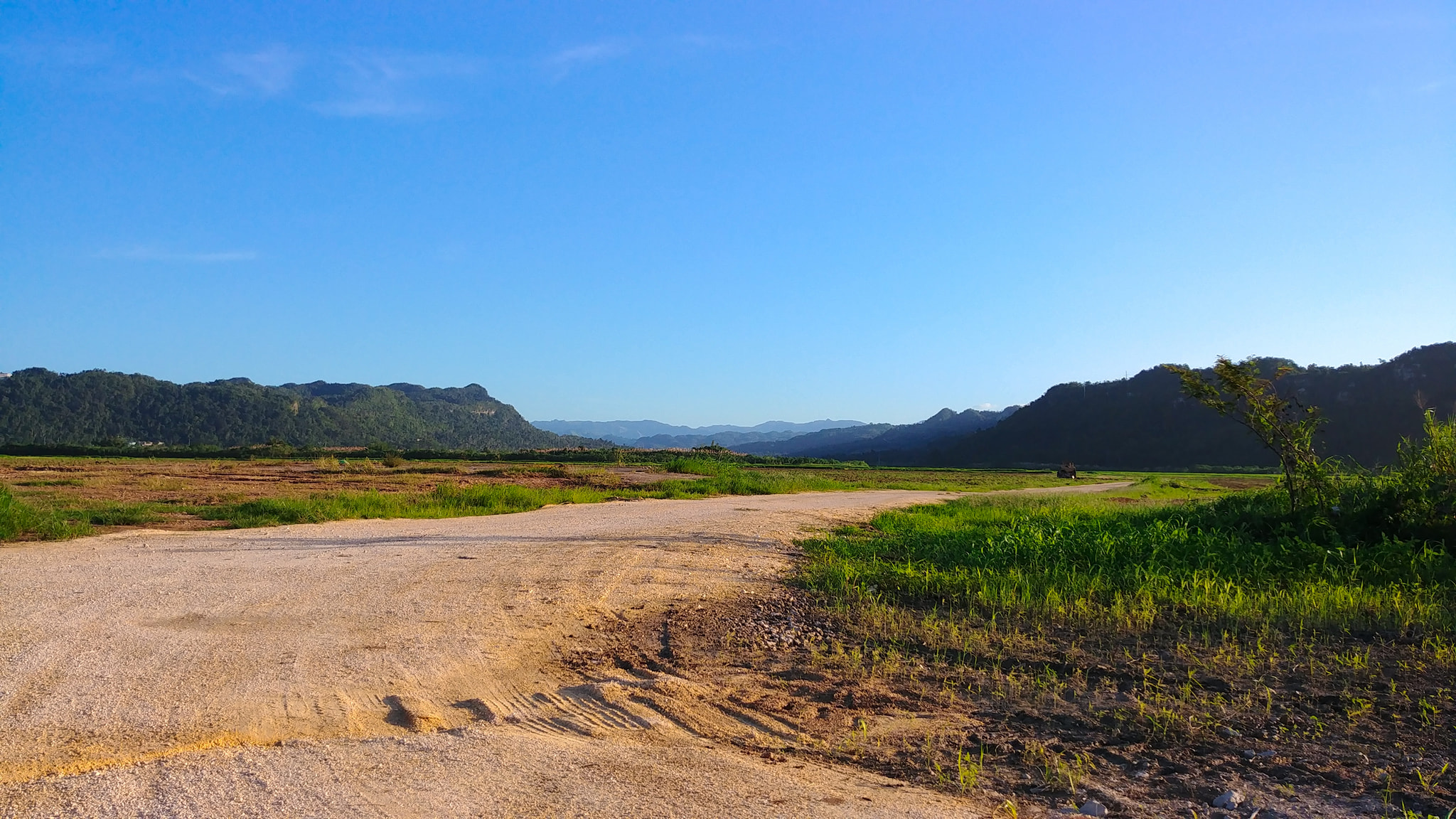
Mogotes in the Manatí River valley in Bajura Afuera.

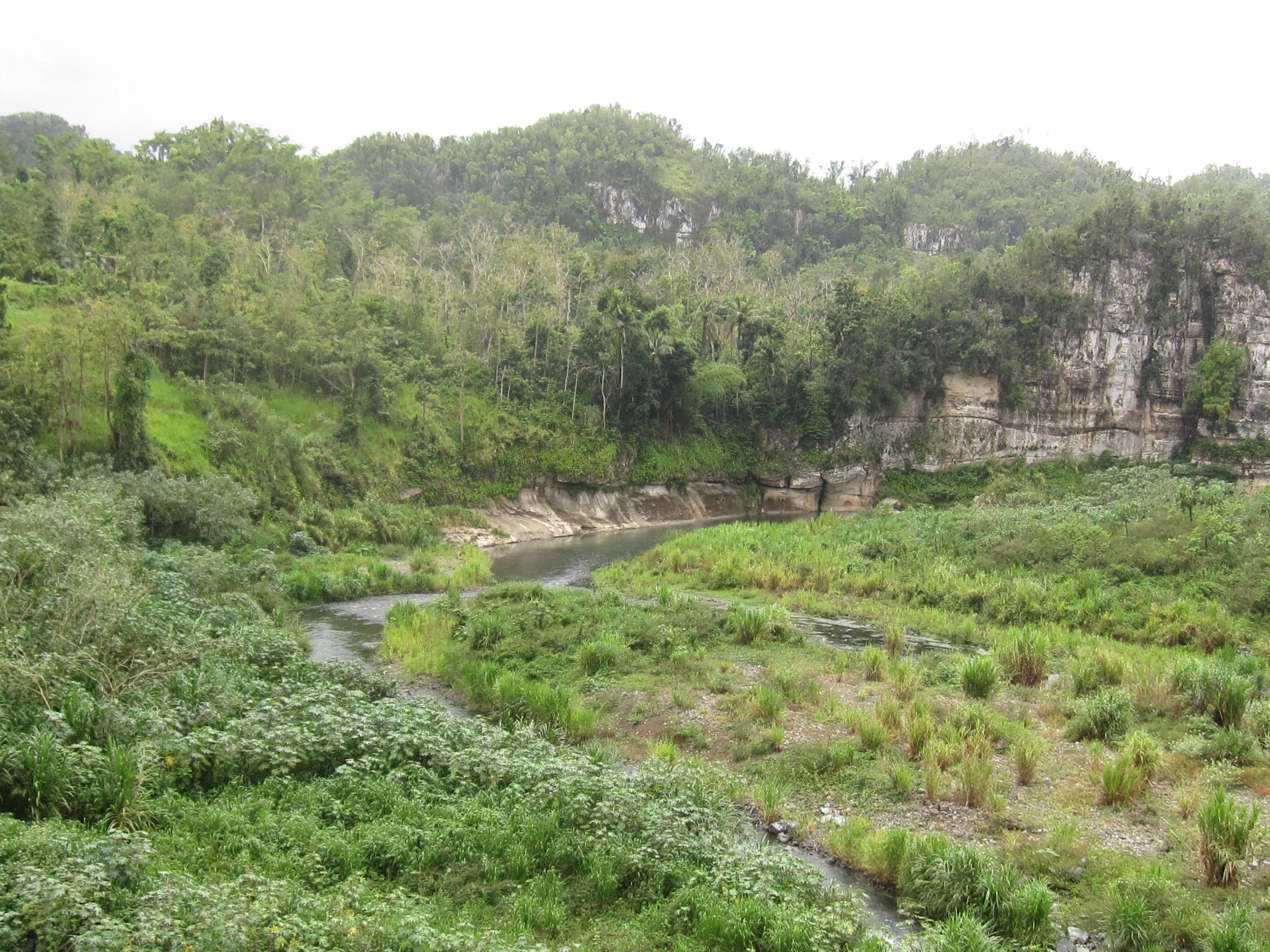
Manatí River and its canyon from Mata de Plátano Bridge in Hato Viejo, Ciales.

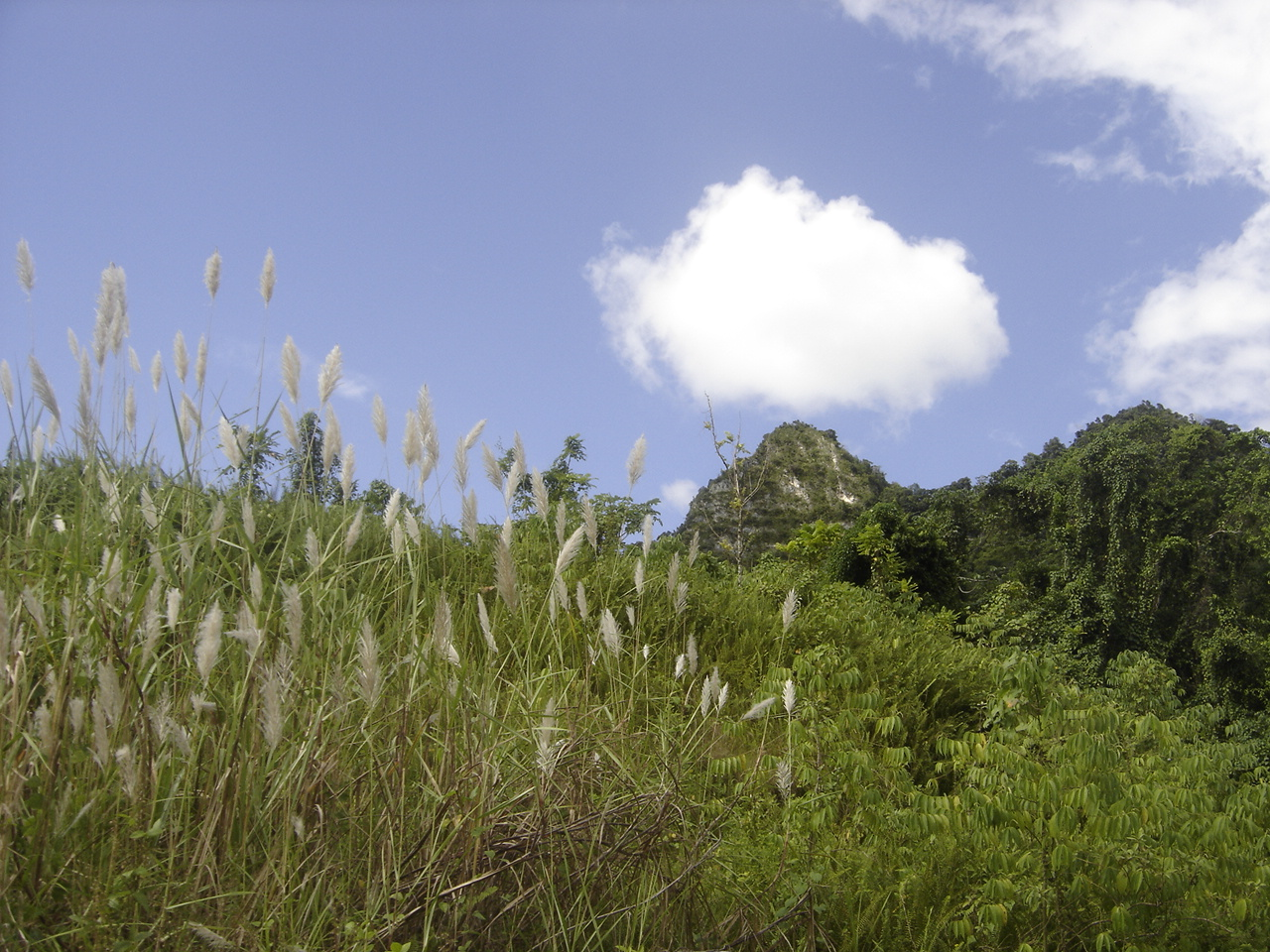
A mogote in Florida.

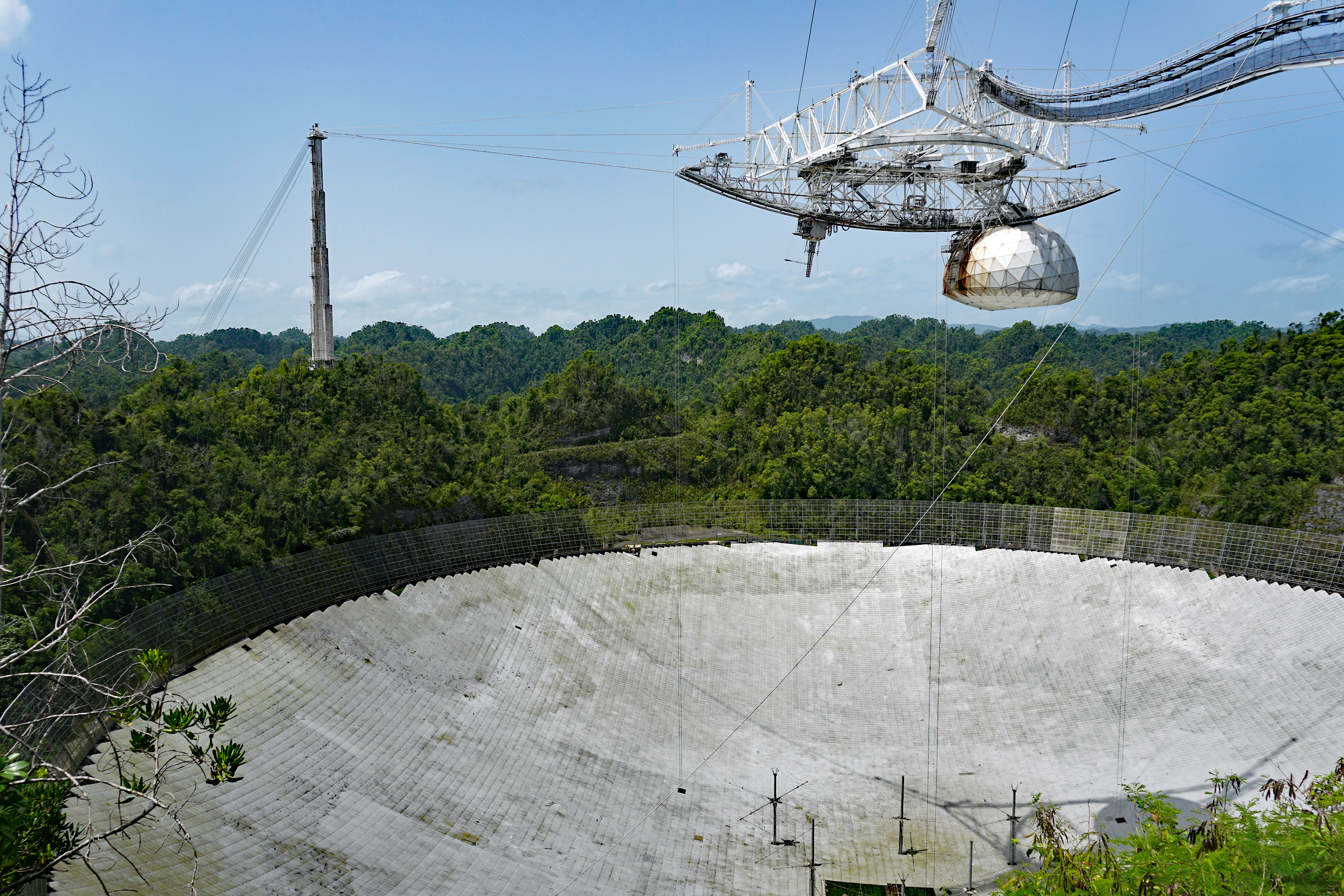
The Arecibo Telescope was built on a natural sinkhole in the Northern Karst.

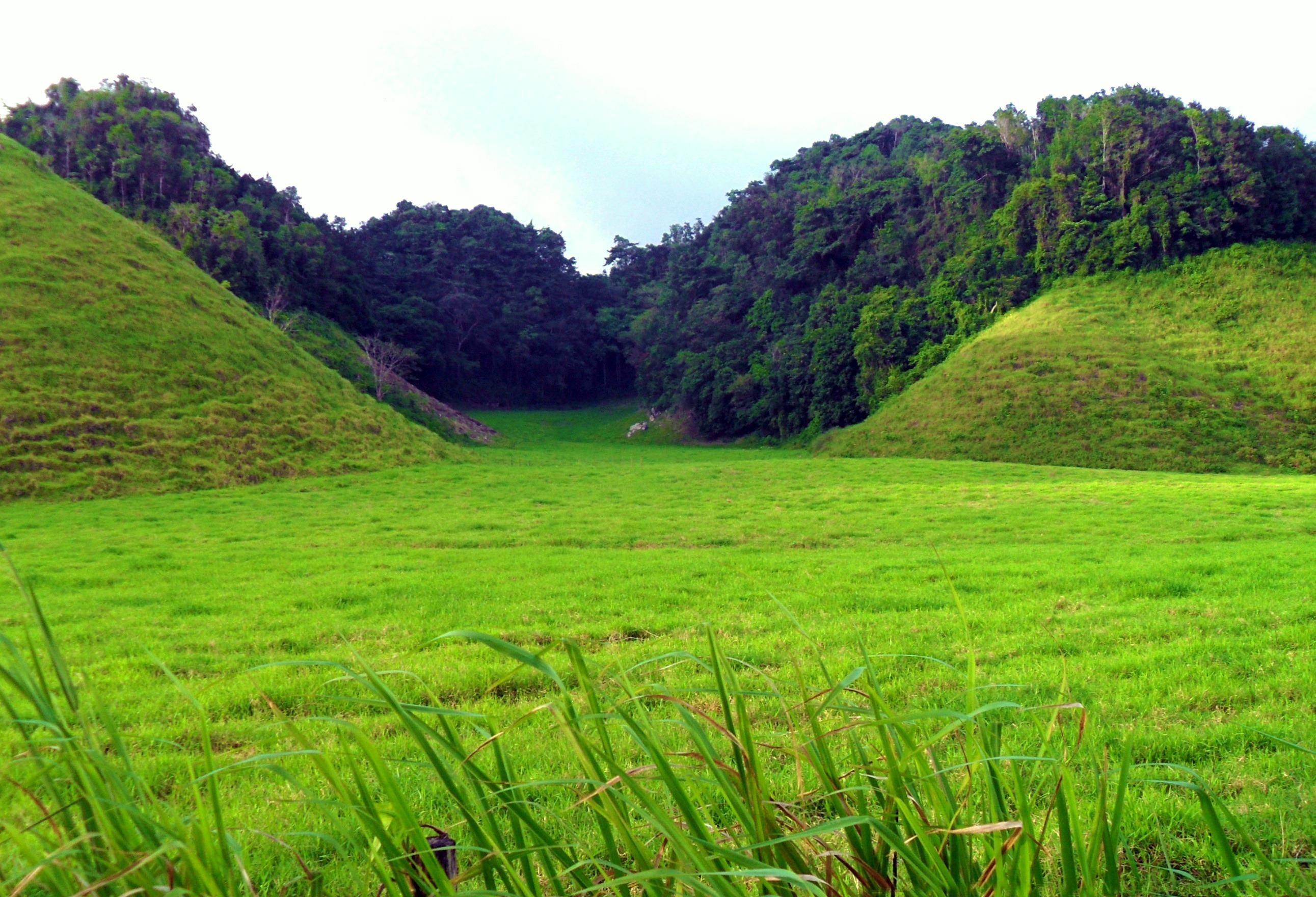
Mogotes in Hatillo.

== See also ==
- Geography of Puerto Rico
- Karst
- List of caves in Puerto Rico
- List of rivers in Puerto Rico
- Valle de Viñales
