= Tower karst =

Tall structures of soluble rock

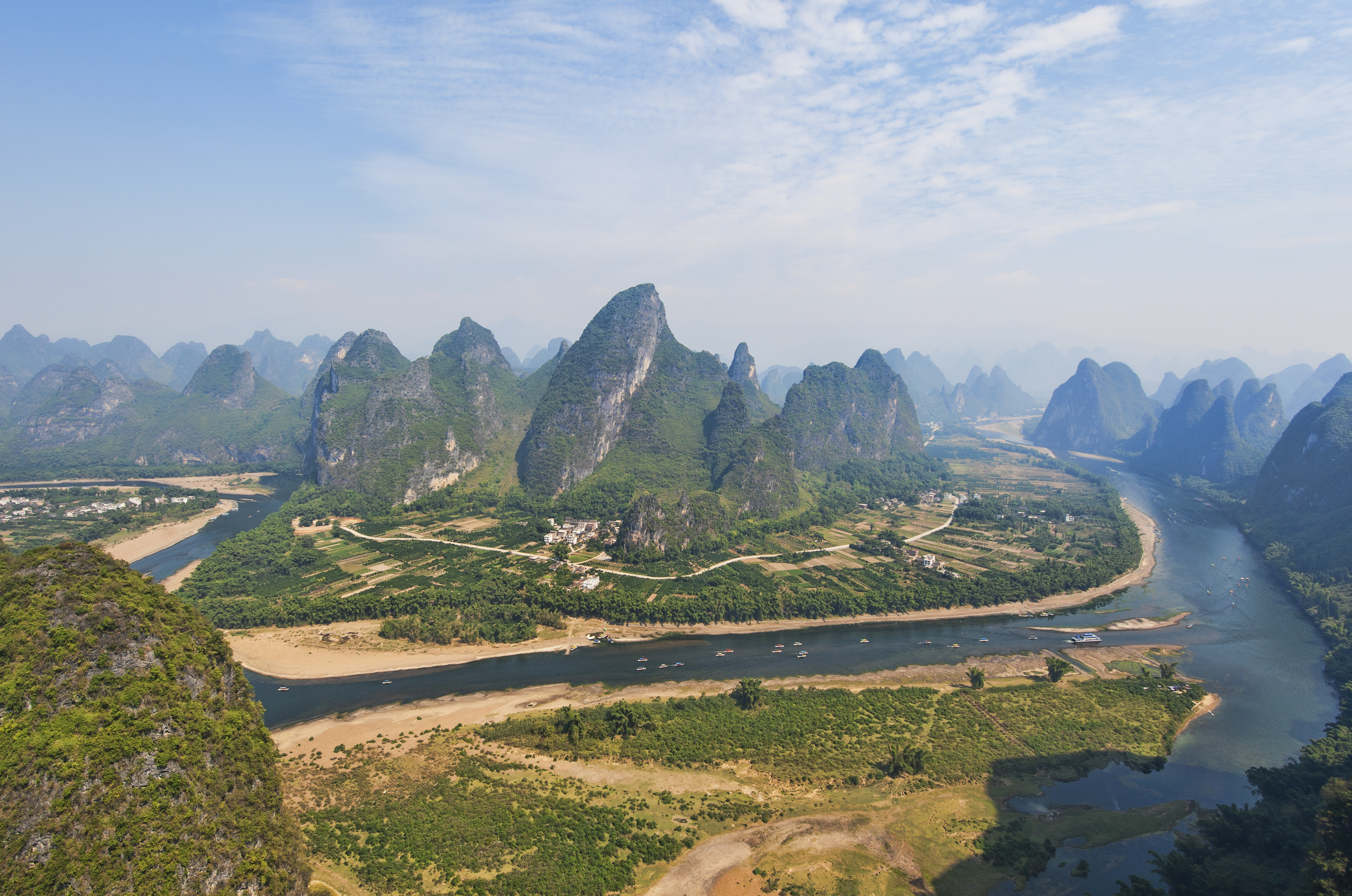
Tower karst at Li River, Guilin, China

Tower karst are tall rock structures made up of soluble rock such as limestone. Tower karst forms as near-vertical joints and fractures are eroded downward by solution, leaving parts of a previously coherent rock mass isolated from each other. Tower karst is most common in tropical regions, although it may form in other climates as well.

Examples include Khao Phing Kan, also known as James Bond Island, in Thailand, and Cat Ba Island in Vietnam.

== See also ==
- Mogote – Steep-sided residual hill of limestone, marble, or dolomite on a flat plain
