= Thouinia paucidentata =

Scientific classification
- Kingdom: Plantae
- Clade: Tracheophytes
- Clade: Angiosperms
- Clade: Eudicots
- Clade: Rosids
- Order: Sapindales
- Family: Sapindaceae
- Genus: Thouinia
- Species: T. paucidentata

Binomial name
- Thouinia paucidentata Radlk. ex Millsp.

Species of flowering plant

Thouinia paucidentata is a plant found mainly in Campeche, Yucatán and Quintana Roo states in southern Mexico. Known by the Mayan name K’ anchunup it is used with medicinal actions by local physicians. Spanish names include hueso de tigre (tiger bone) and madera dura (hard wood).
