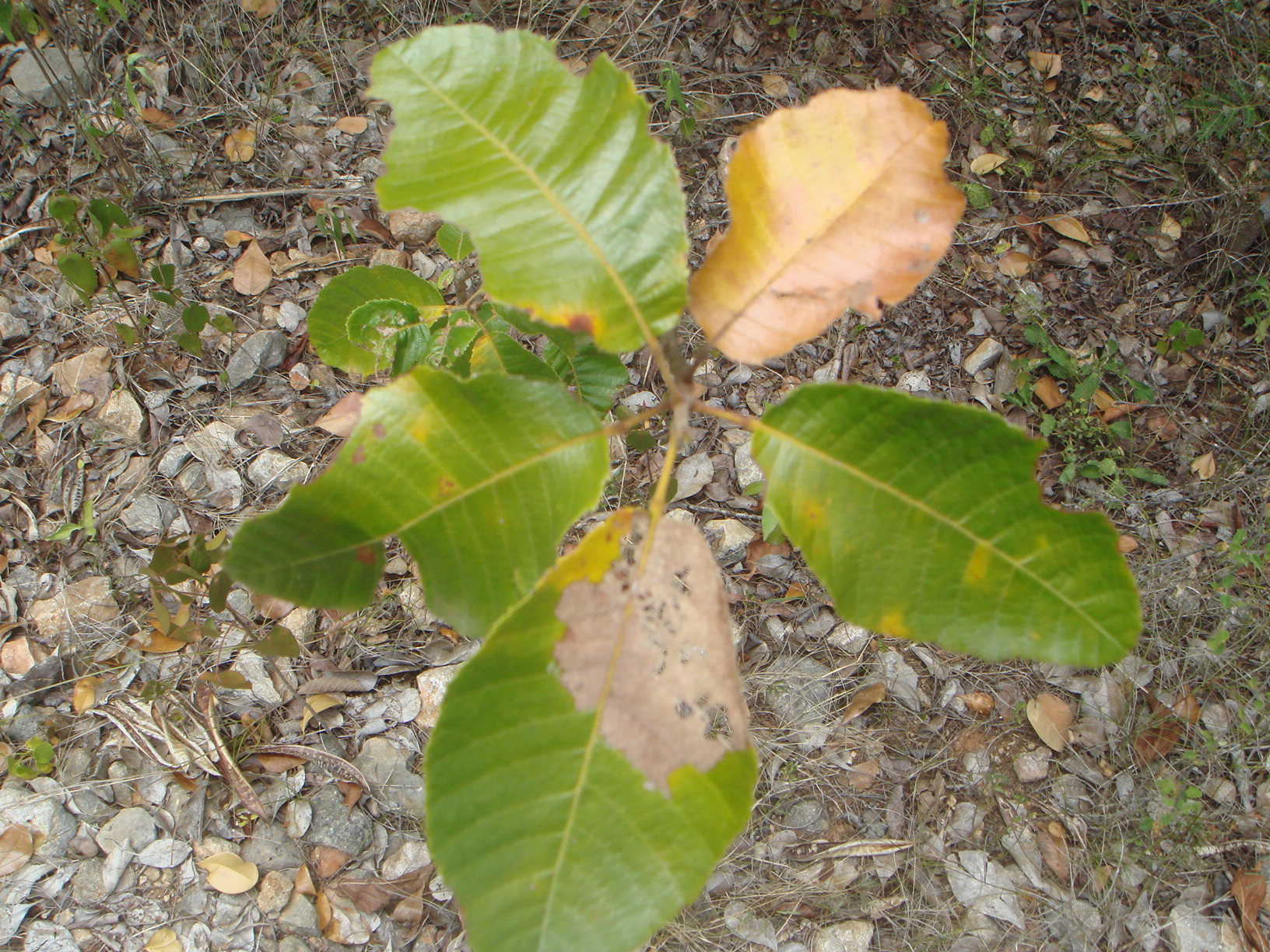
- Thouinia striata var. portoricensis

Scientific classification
- Kingdom: Plantae
- Clade: Tracheophytes
- Clade: Angiosperms
- Clade: Eudicots
- Clade: Rosids
- Order: Sapindales
- Family: Sapindaceae
- Subfamily: Sapindoideae
- Genus: Thouinia; Poit.

Synonyms
- Carpidopterix H.Karst.; Thyana Ham.; Vargasia Bertero ex Spreng.

= Thouinia =

Genus of flowering plants

Thouinia is a genus of flowering plants in the family Sapindaceae.

== Distribution and habitat ==
They are native to Mexico to Central America (within Belize, Costa Rica, El Salvador, Guatemala, Honduras and Nicaragua) and the Caribbean (within Bahamas, Cuba, the Dominican Republic, Haiti, Puerto Rico and the Turks and Caicos Islands).

== Taxonomy ==
The genus is named for André Thouin, a French botanist.

=== Species ===
As of 2020 Kew's Plants of the World Online lists 27 species in the genus:

- Thouinia acuminata S.Watson
- Thouinia acunae Borhidi & O.Muñiz
- Thouinia baracoensis Borhidi
- Thouinia brachybotrya Donn.Sm.
- Thouinia canescens Radlk.
- Thouinia clarensis Lippold
- Thouinia cubensis Radlk.
- Thouinia discolor Griseb.
- Thouinia domingensis Urb. & Radlk.
- Thouinia gibarensis P.A.González & J.L.Gómez
- Thouinia holguinensis Lippold
- Thouinia hypoleuca Borhidi
- Thouinia leonis Alain
- Thouinia maestrensis Lippold
- Thouinia milleri Leonard
- Thouinia patentinervis Radlk.
- Thouinia paucidentata Radlk. ex Millsp.
- Thouinia punctata Radlk.
- Thouinia racemosa Radlk.
- Thouinia rotundata C.Wright
- Thouinia serrata Radlk.
- Thouinia simplicifolia Poit.
- Thouinia striata Radlk.
- Thouinia stricta Lippold
- Thouinia tomentosa DC.
- Thouinia trifoliata Poit.
- Thouinia villosa DC.
