= Mogote =

Steep-sided residual hill of limestone, marble, or dolomite on a flat plain

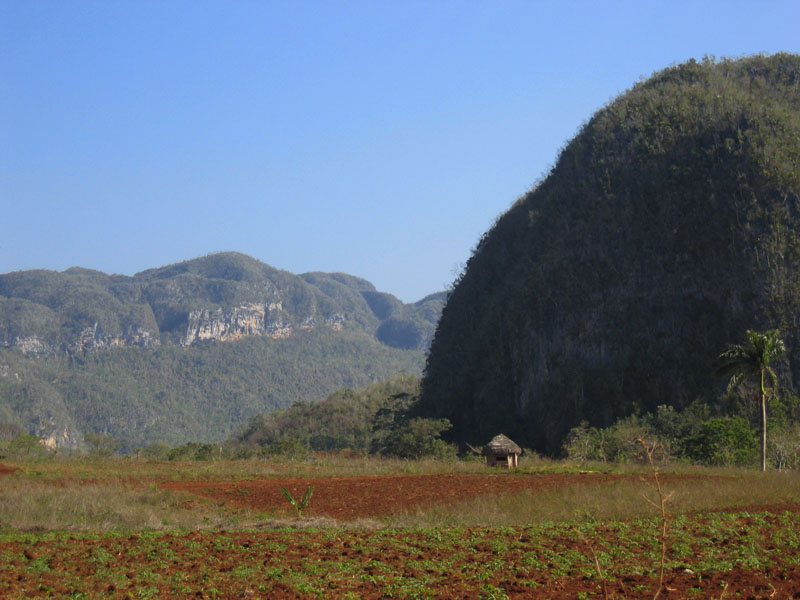
Dome-like rounded mogotes in Viñales Valley, Cuba.

A mogote (/məˈɡoʊti/) is a generally isolated, steep-sided residual hill in the tropics composed of either limestone, marble, or dolomite. Mogotes are surrounded by nearly flat alluvial plains. The hills typically have a rounded, tower-like form.

== Overview ==
Mogotes are hills, isolated or linked, with very steep, almost vertical, walls, surrounded by alluvial plains in the tropics, regardless of whether the carbonate strata in which they have formed are folded or not.

Mogotes are common in tropical and subtropical karst areas around the world, specifically in southern China, the Southeast Asian countries of Indonesia, Laos, Malaysia, Myanmar, the Philippines, Thailand, and Vietnam; as well as the Caribbean, especially in Cuba, Puerto Rico, and the Dominican Republic (Los Haitises National Park).

The word mogote comes from the Basque mokoti 'sharp-pointed' (from moko 'mountain peak'). In Puerto Rico, several mogotes along a ridge are called pepinos.

== Gallery ==
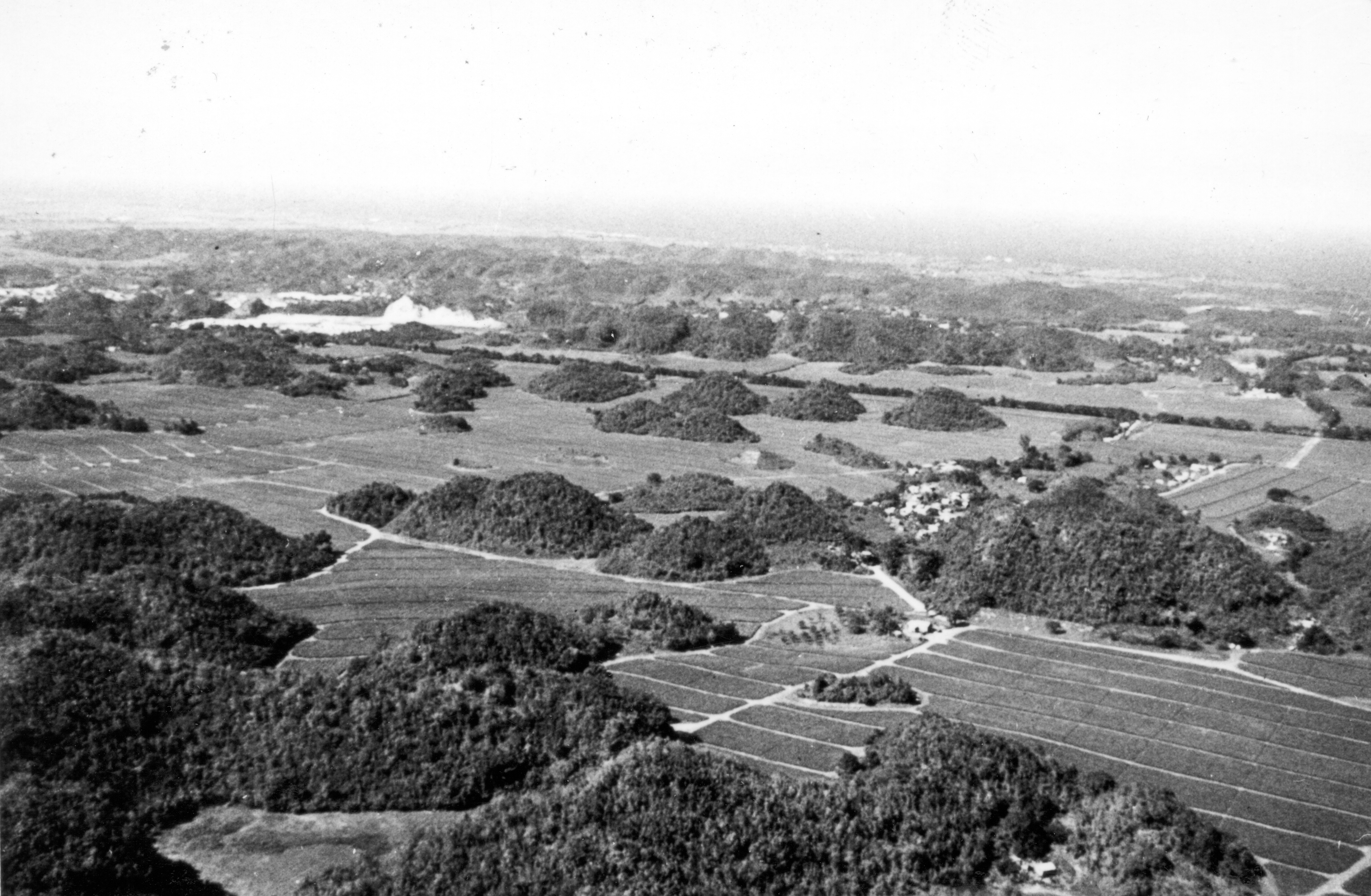
Mogotes in Puerto Rico rising out of pineapple fields in a plain of blanket sand near Coto Sur. The quarry in the left background is 1 kilometer east of Manati.

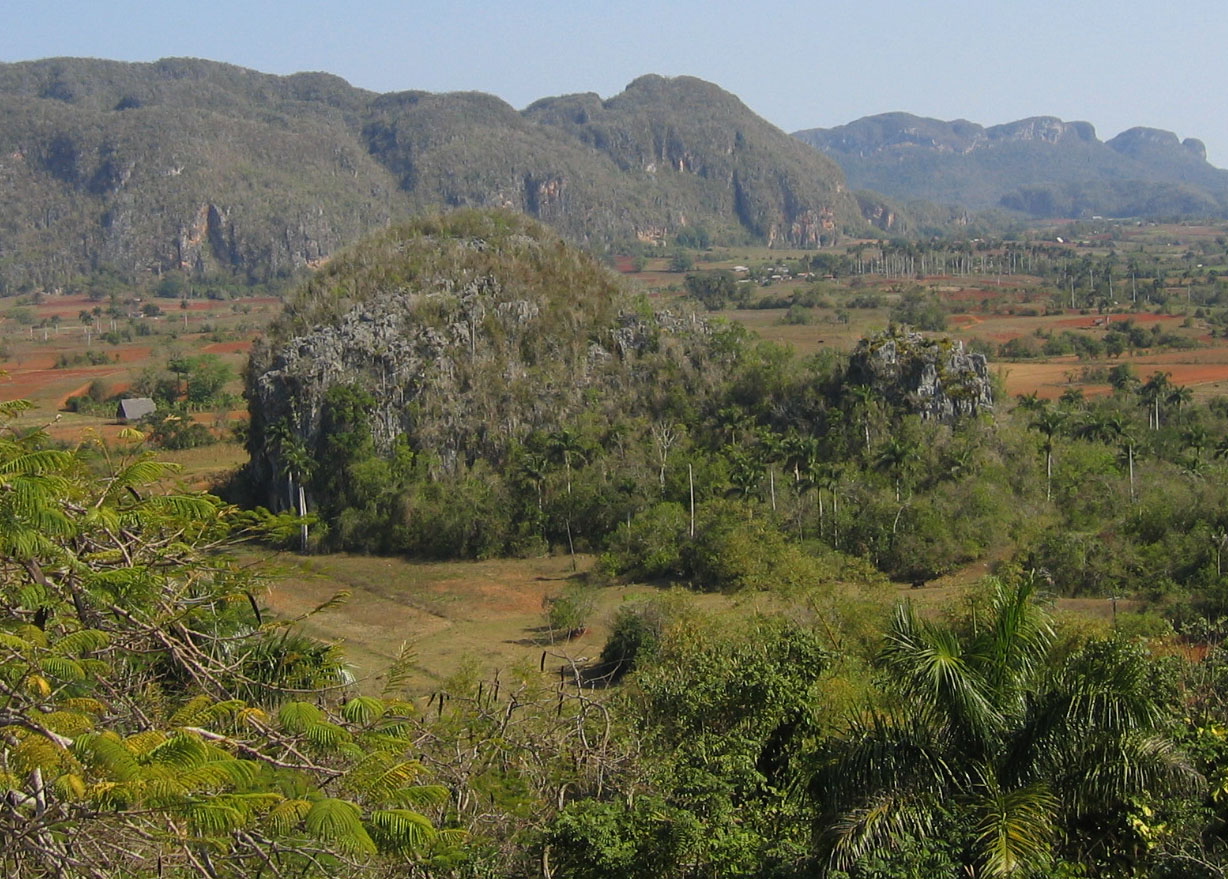
Two mogotes showing their typical rounded shape in Viñales Valley in Pinar del Río Province, western Cuba

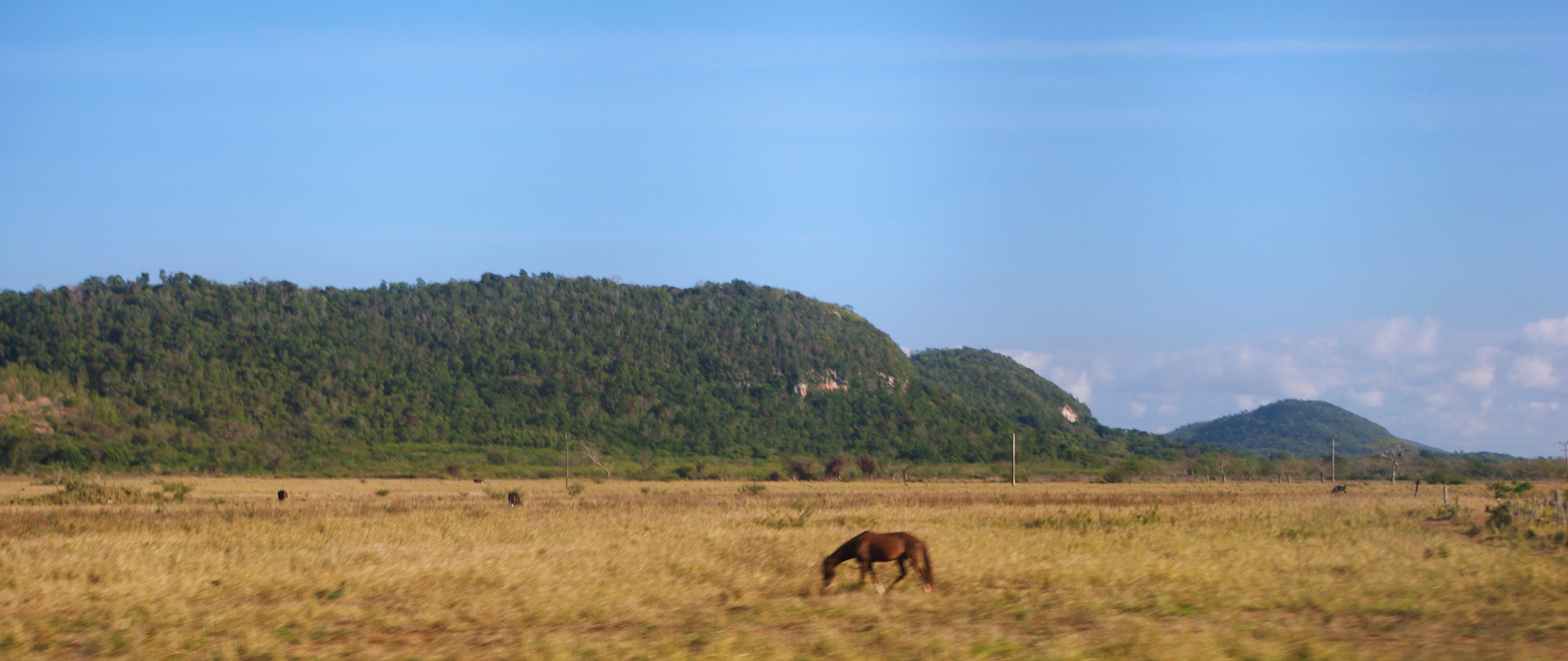
Mogotes, Northern Matanzas Province, near the city of Cárdenas, Cuba

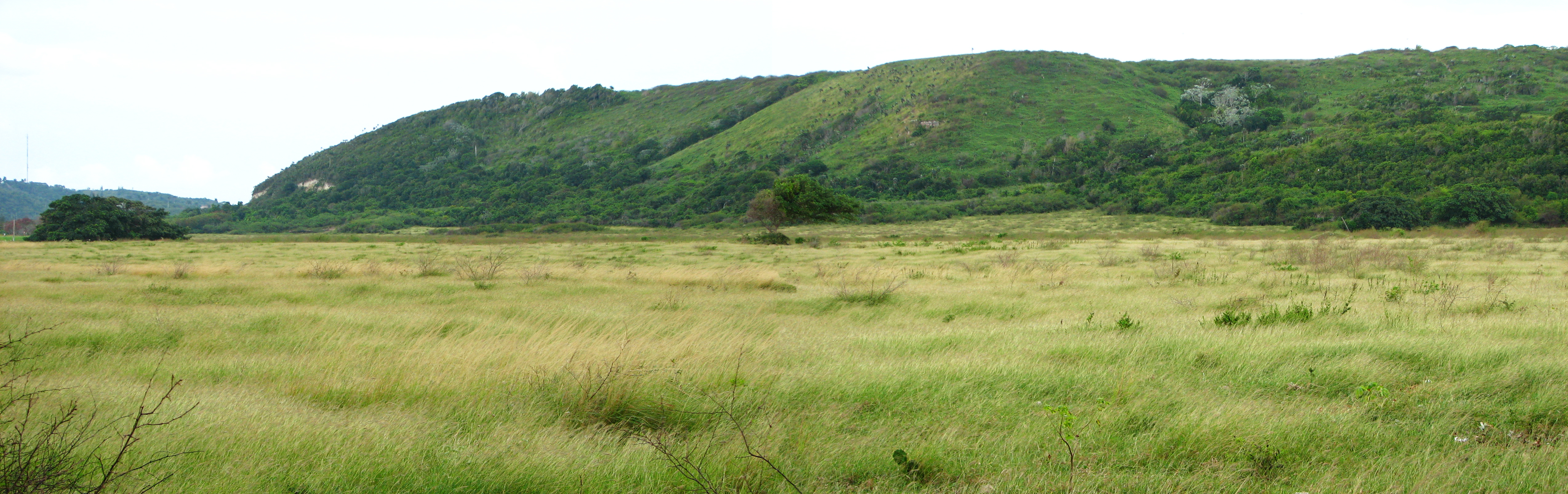
Mogotes in Northern Cuba, between Matanzas and Havana Provinces

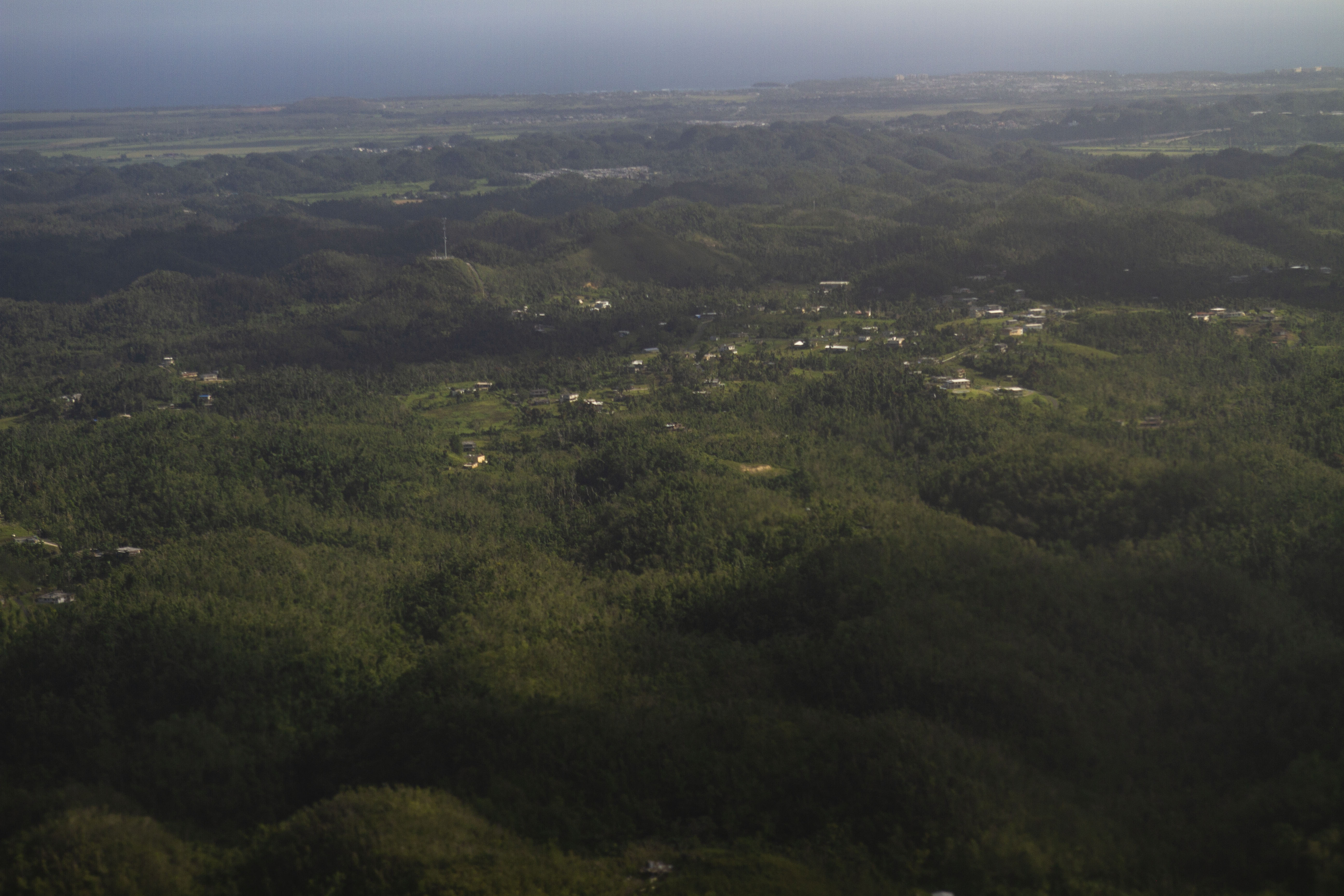
View of mogotes along the Northern karst zone of Puerto Rico.

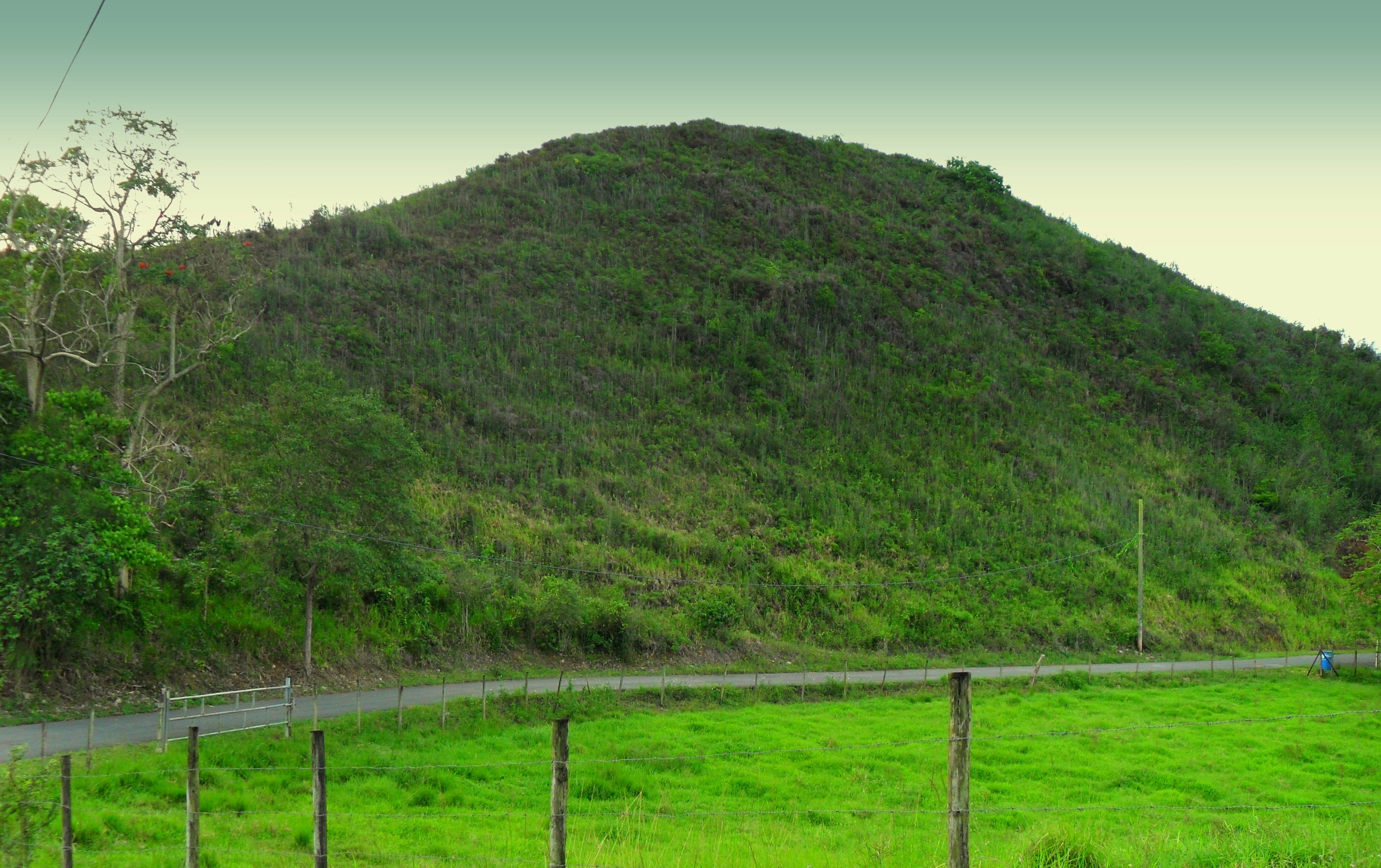
Mogotes in Sector Hess in Esperanza, Arecibo, Puerto Rico.

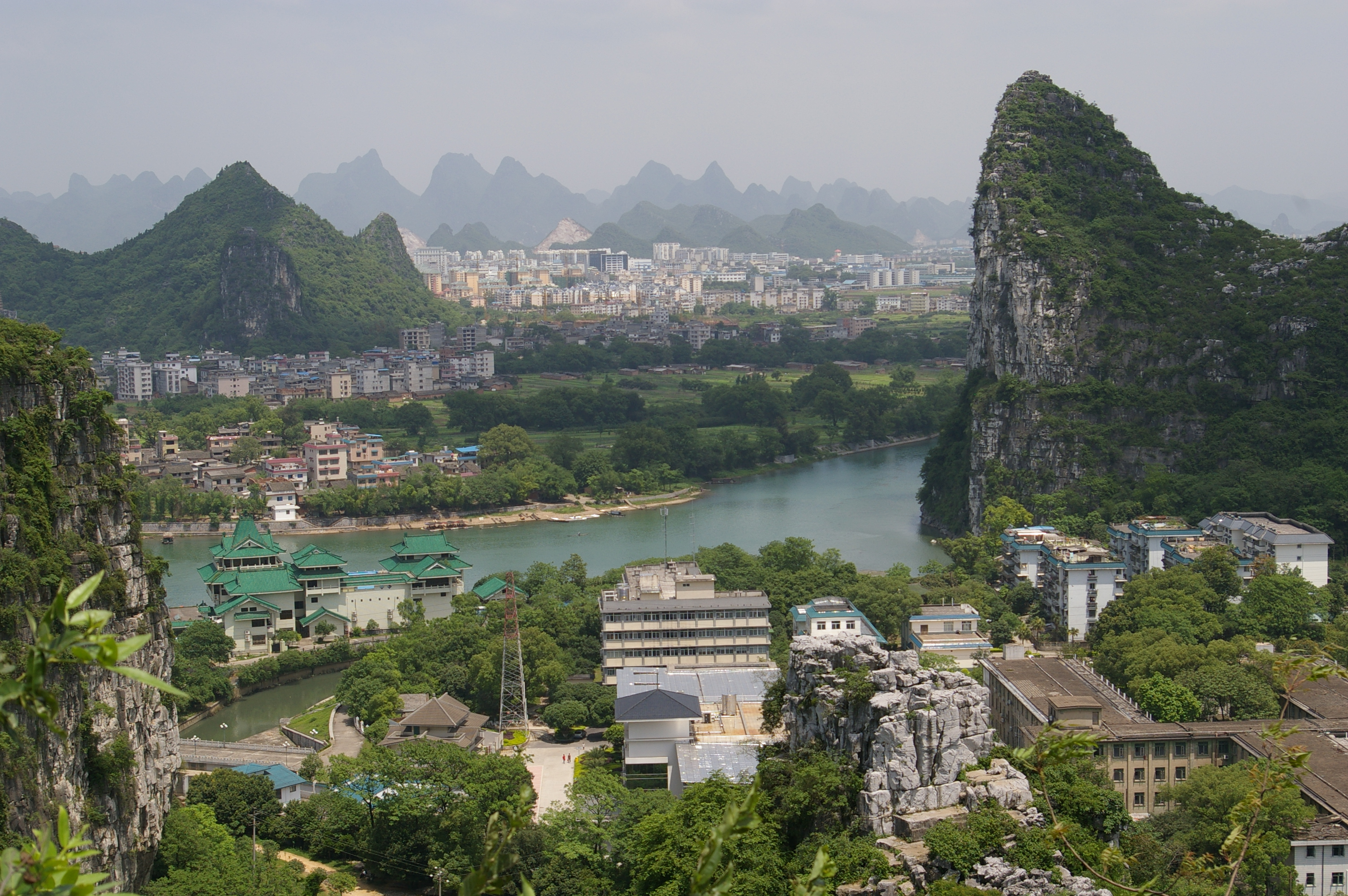
Fengcongs and fenglins in Guilin, Guangxi, southeastern China, part of the South China Karst region.

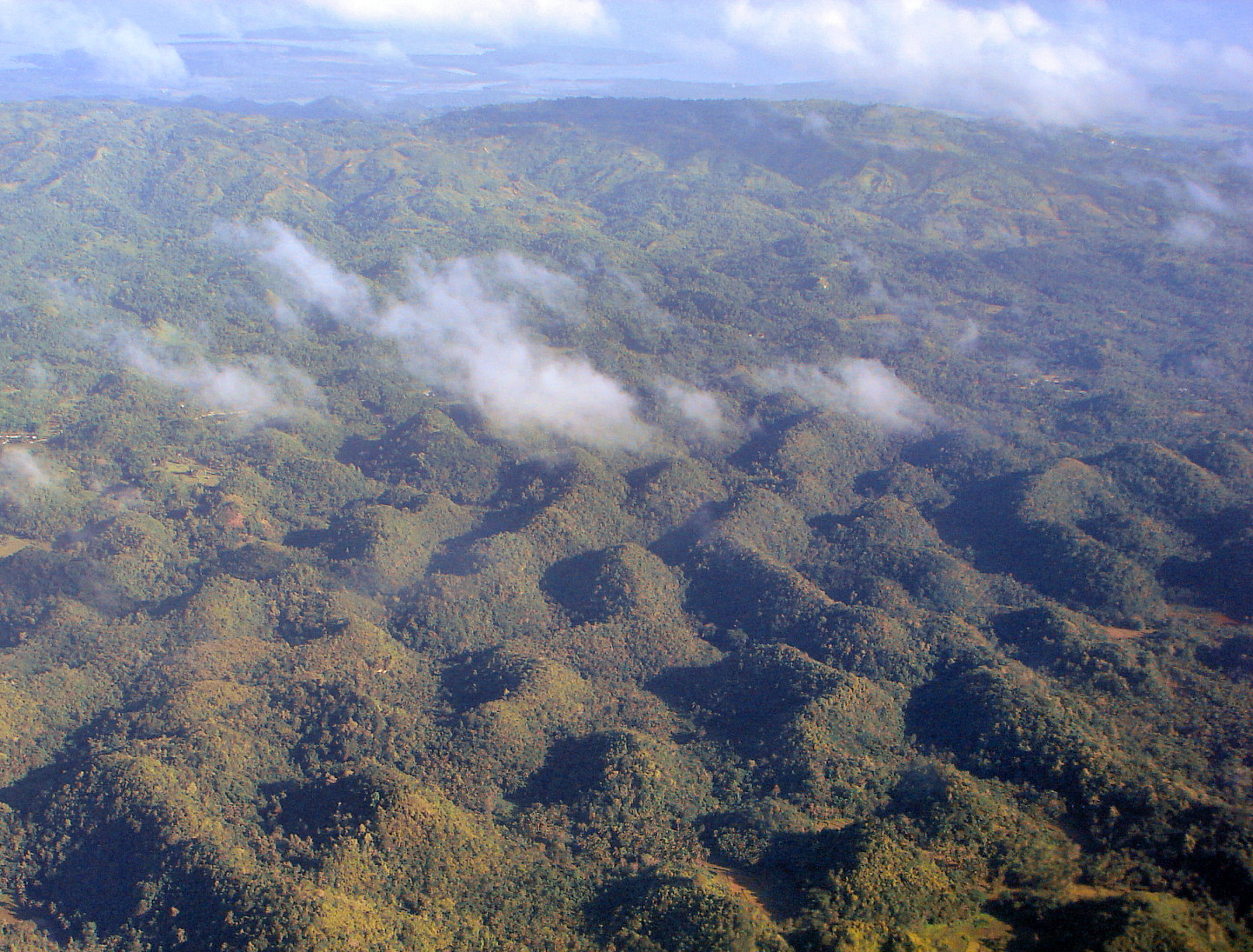
Aerial view of the Chocolate Hills, Bohol, Philippines, exhibiting both mogotes and cockpit karst characteristics.

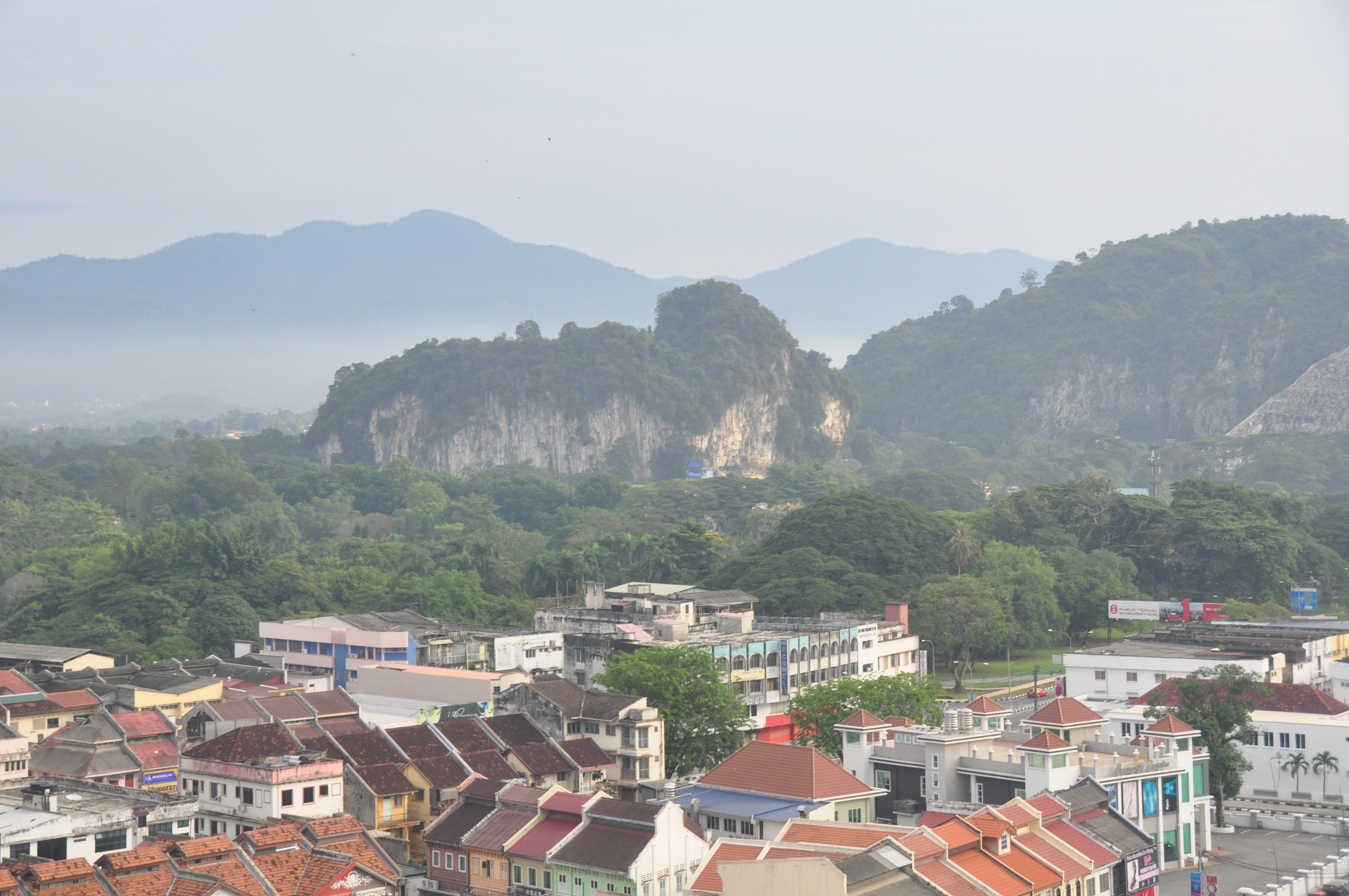
A mogote in Ipoh, Perak, Malaysia.

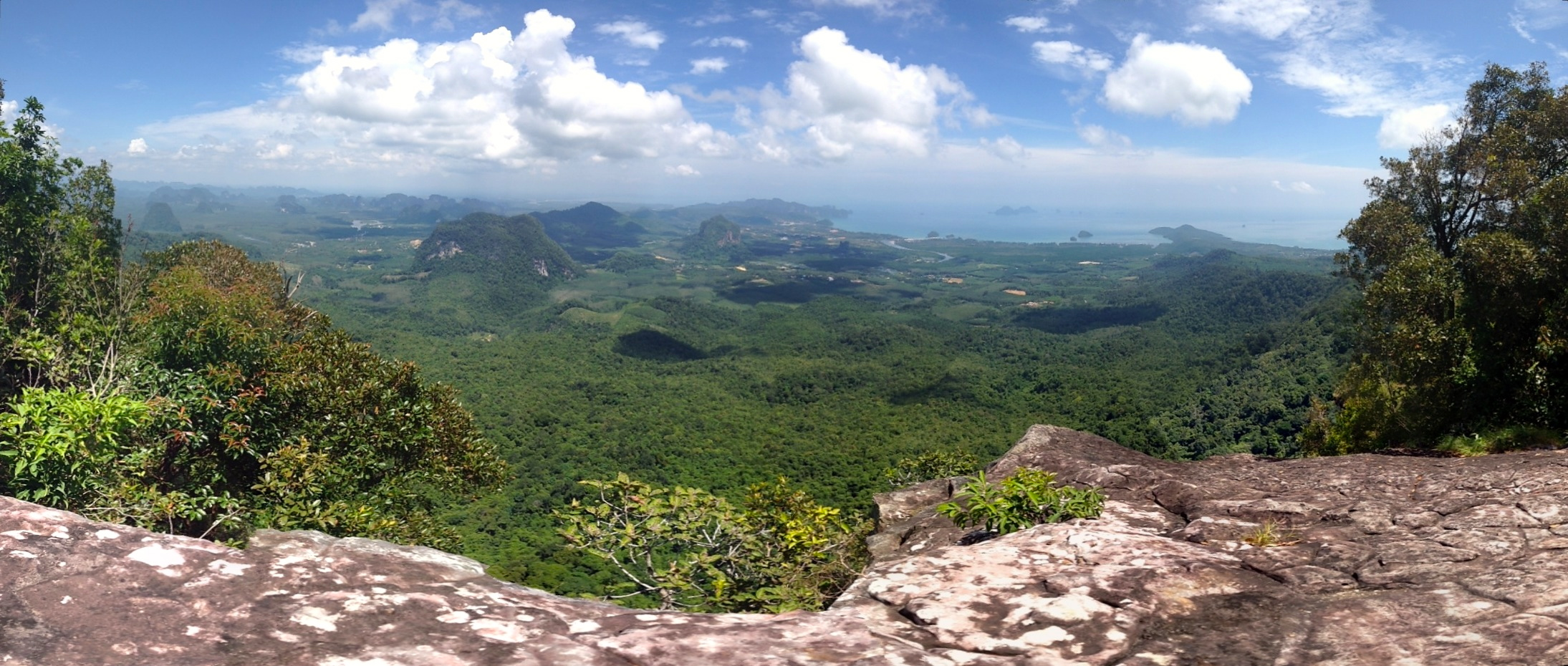
Mogotes, Krabi Province, southern Thailand.

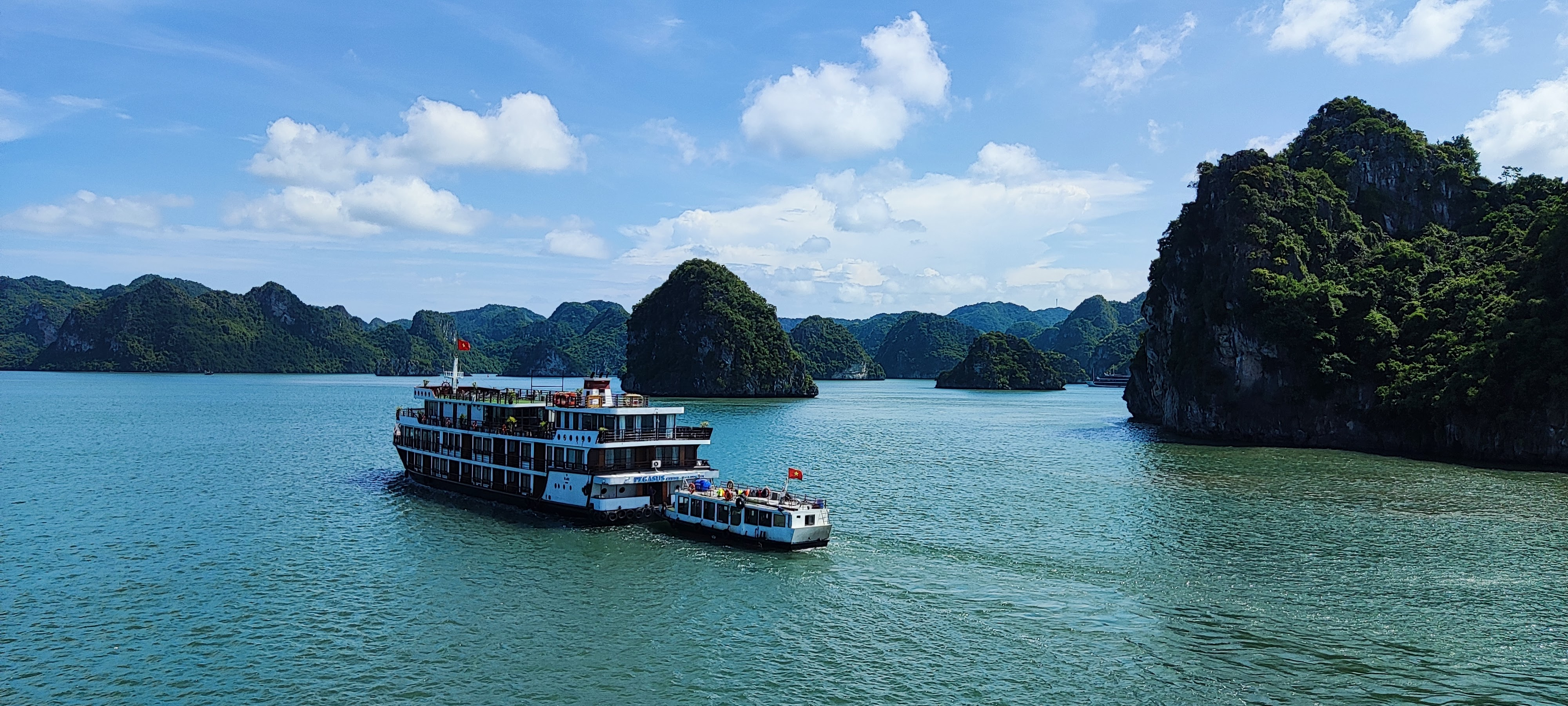
Islets of mogotes in Ha Long Bay, Vietnam.

== See also ==
- Bornhardt
- Butte
- Inselberg
- Tepui
- Tower karst

Areas

- Chocolate Hills, Philippines
- Hin Namno, Laos
- Kinta Valley, Malaysia
- Krabi Province, Thailand
- Los Haitises, Dominican Republic
- Northern Karst Region, Puerto Rico
- Phong Nha-Ke Bang, Vietnam
- South China Karst, China
- Viñales Valley, Cuba
