= Beatriz, Caguas, Puerto Rico =

Barrio of Puerto Rico

Beatriz
- Barrio
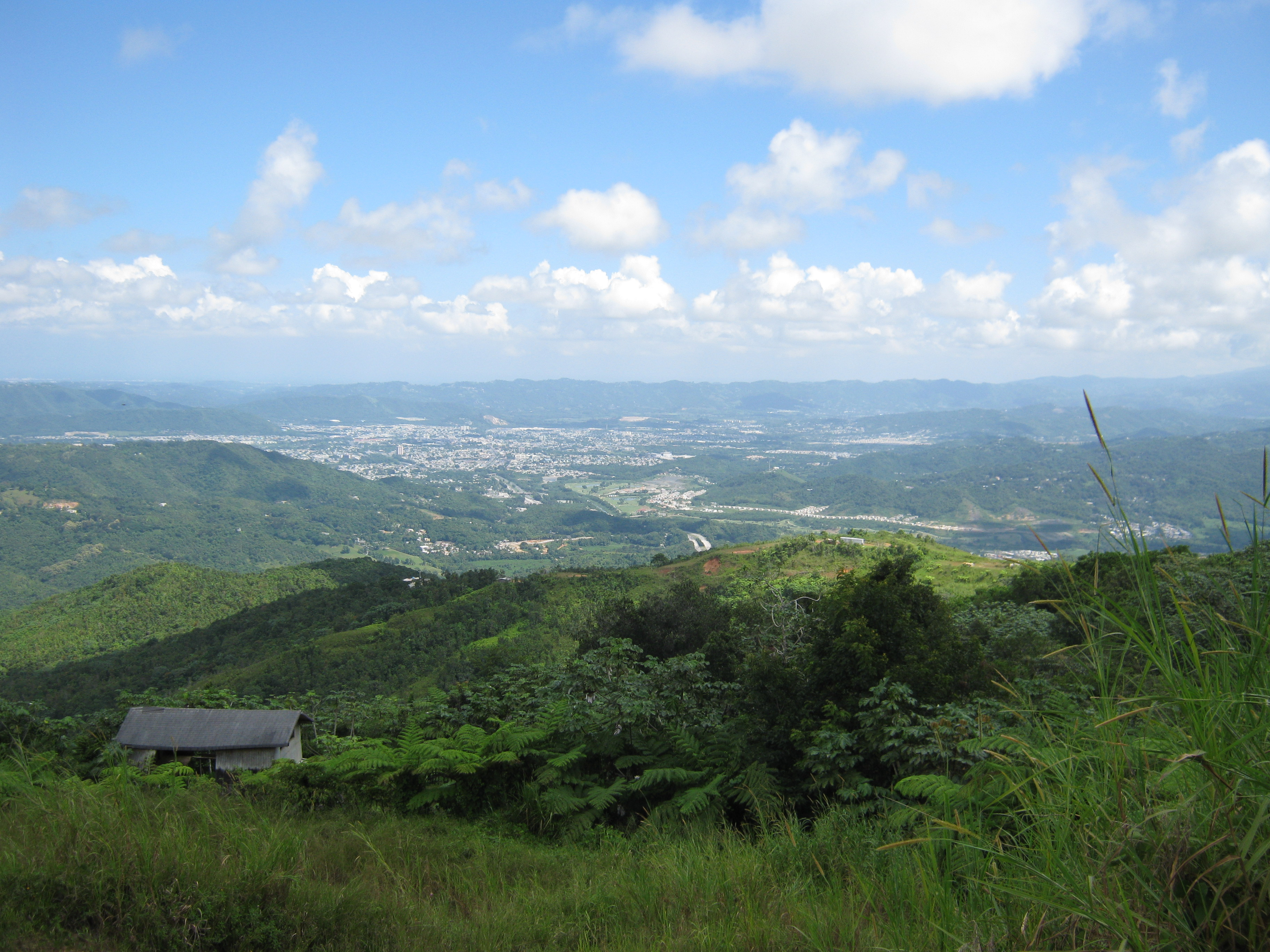
- View of Caguas from Cerro Las Piñas in Beatriz

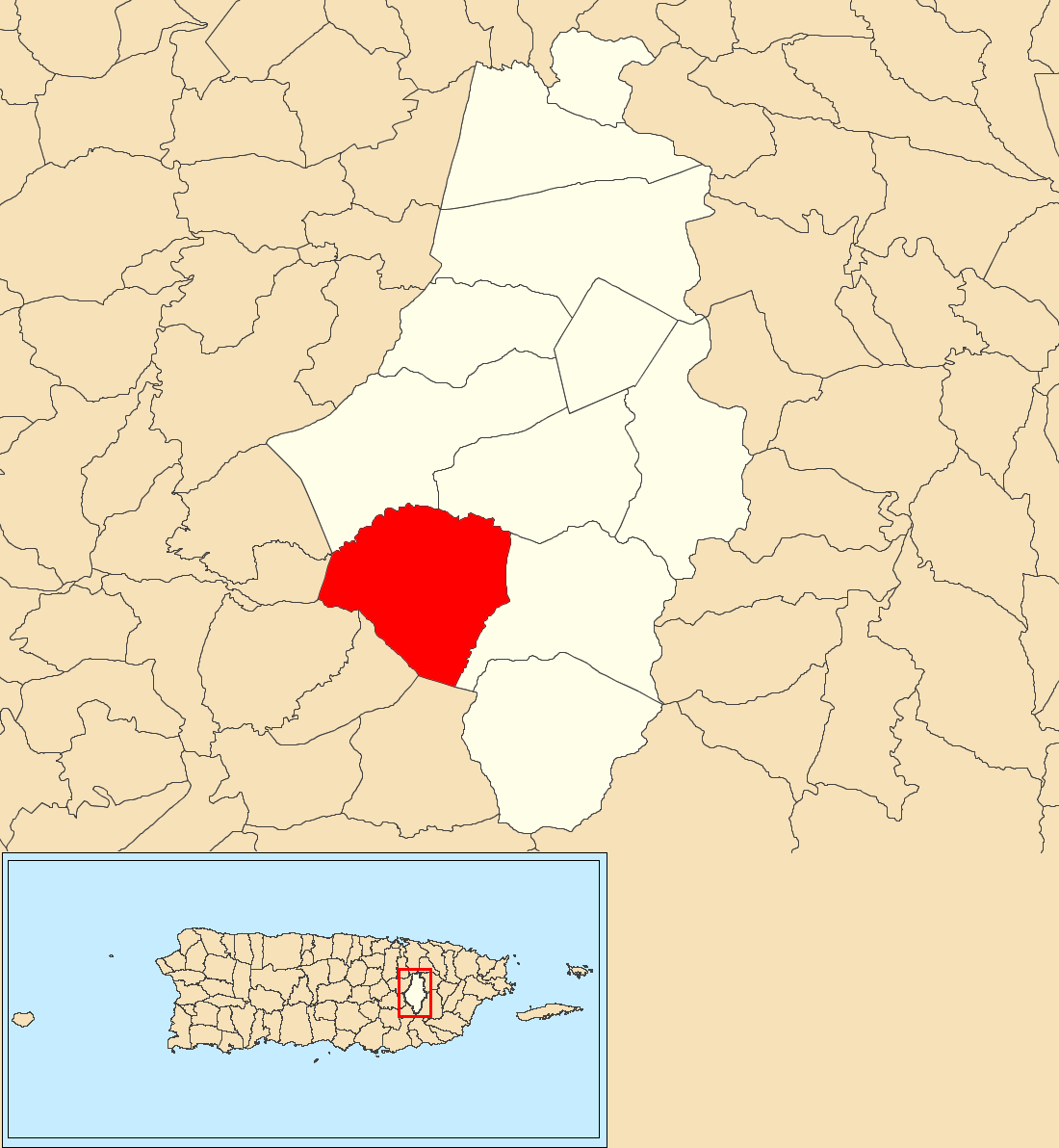
- Location of Beatriz within the municipality of Caguas shown in red

- Location of Puerto Rico
- Coordinates: 18°10′23″N 66°04′38″W
- Commonwealth: Puerto Rico
- Municipality: Caguas

Area
  - Total: 6.13 sq mi (15.9 km^{2})
  - Land: 6.13 sq mi (15.9 km^{2})
  - Water: 0.00 sq mi (0 km^{2})
- Elevation: 725 ft (221 m)

Population (2020)
  - Total: 3,281
  - Density: 710.1/sq mi (274.2/km^{2})
- Source: 2010 Census
- Time zone: UTC−4 (AST)
- ZIP Code: 00725, 00726, 00727
- Area codes: 787, 939

Beatriz is a barrio in the municipality of Caguas, Puerto Rico. Its population in 2020 was 3,281.

== Geography ==
Beatriz is located at the coordinates 18°10′23″N 66°4′37″W. According to the United States Census Bureau, Beatriz has a total area of 15.89 km^{2}, of which 15.89 km^{2} is land and (0.03%) 0.01 km^{2} is water. Beatriz is located in the Sierra de Cayey, a subrange of the Cordillera Central mountain range, making it one of the barrios of Caguas which are not located in the Caguas Valley. The name of the barrio comes from the Doña Beatriz Creek which crosses it and flows into the Turabo River.

== Sectors and demographics ==
Barrios (which are, in contemporary times, roughly comparable to minor civil divisions) in turn are further subdivided into smaller local populated place areas/units called sectores (sectors in English). The types of sectores may vary, from normally sector to urbanización to reparto to barriada to residencial, among others.

The following sectors are in Beatriz: Alturas de Beatriz, Alturas de Caguas (Beatriz), Barrio Beatriz, Colinas de Villa Coquí, La Jurado, Las Abejas, Los Ortíz, Los Panes, Muñoz Grillo, Piñas I, Piñas II, Piñas III, and Villa Paolo.

According to the 2010 Census, there were 4,353 people residing in Beatriz. The population density was 27,391 inhabitants per km^{2}. Of 4,353 inhabitants, Beatriz was composed of 68.76% Whites, 13% were Black, 0.62% were American Indian, 0.05% were Asian, 0.02% were Pacific Islanders, 12.27% were of other races and 5.28% belonged to two or more races. In all, the population was 99.47% Hispanic or Latino.

Historical population
Census	Pop.	Note	%±
1900	868		—
1910	990		14.1%
1920	2,727		175.5%
1930	2,417		−11.4%
1940	2,604		7.7%
1950	2,713		4.2%
1960	3,365		24.0%
1970	3,262		−3.1%
1980	3,543		8.6%
1990	3,807		7.5%
2000	4,467		17.3%
2010	4,353		−2.6%
2020	3,281		−24.6%
U.S. Decennial Census; 1899 (shown as 1900) 1910-1930; 1930-1950 1980-2000 2010 2020

== History ==
Beatriz was in Spain's gazetteers until Puerto Rico was ceded by Spain in the aftermath of the Spanish–American War under the terms of the Treaty of Paris of 1898 and became an unincorporated territory of the United States. In 1899, the United States Department of War conducted a census of Puerto Rico finding that the population of Beatriz barrio was 868.

The area was mostly made up of subsistence farms in the 19th century. Botanist William Edwin Safford visited Beatriz in 1898 to document the local plant life.

The 1899 San Ciriaco hurricane devastated Beatriz, and many farmers began working for the newly established military government of the United States of America building roads. At the time, a store owned by wealthy landowner Don Ramón Álvarez was the center of economic life in Beatriz. In 1900, one of the store's cashiers Don Demetrio López was elected alcalde and comisario of Beatriz.

Beatriz barrio was hit by Hurricane Maria on 20 September 2017 and many residents still did not have electricity as of March 2018, six months later.

== Landmarks and places of interest ==
- Carretera Central, the historic road connecting San Juan in the north to Ponce in the south passes through Beatriz.
- Centro Los Panes, a community center near La Jurado sector.
- Cerro Las Piñas, a hill located in the boundary with Beatriz, Cayey which offers panoramic views of the Caguas Valley and its surrounding mountains.
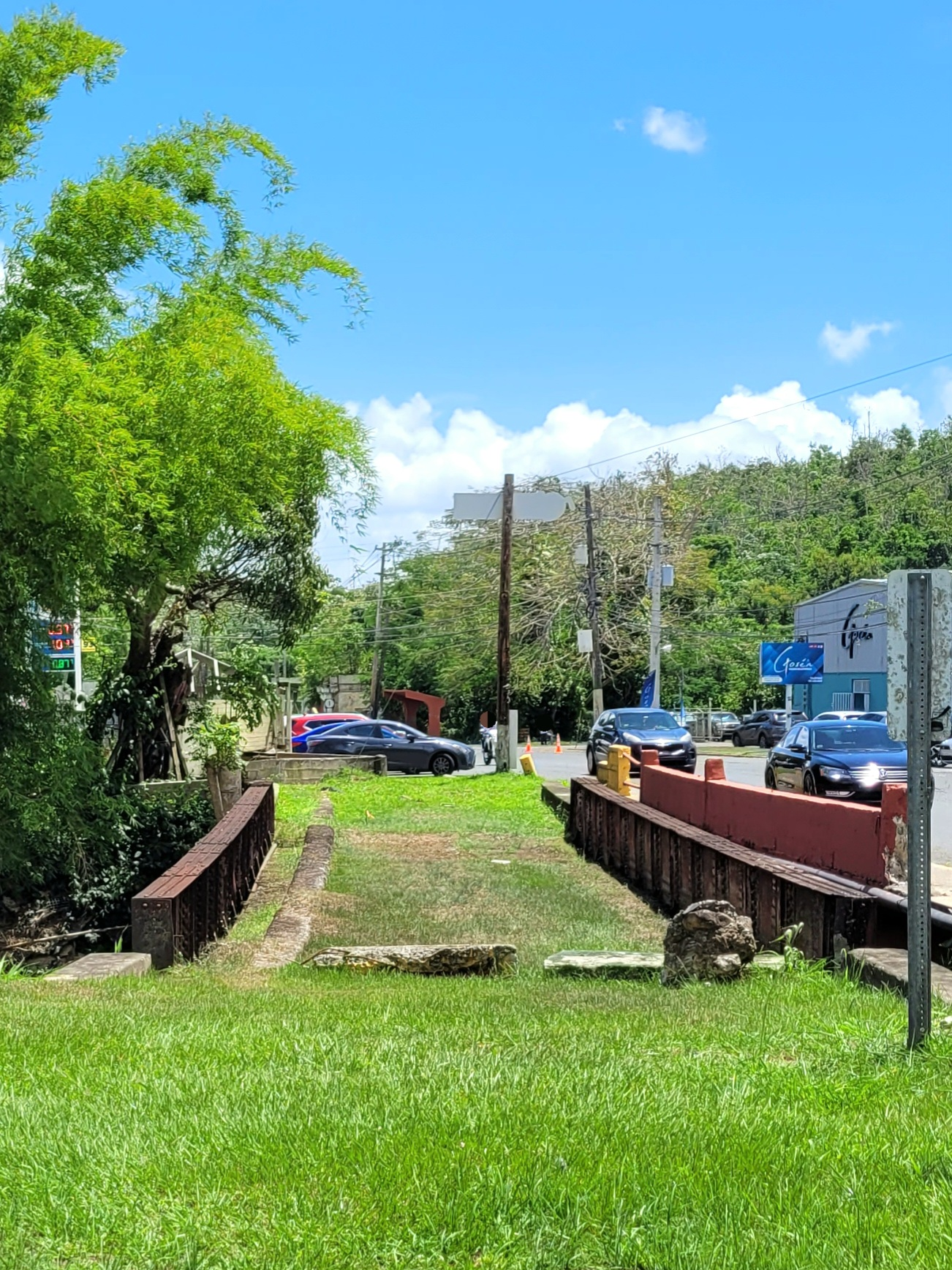
Puente Las Quebradillas between Beatriz, Borinquen and Turabo barrios

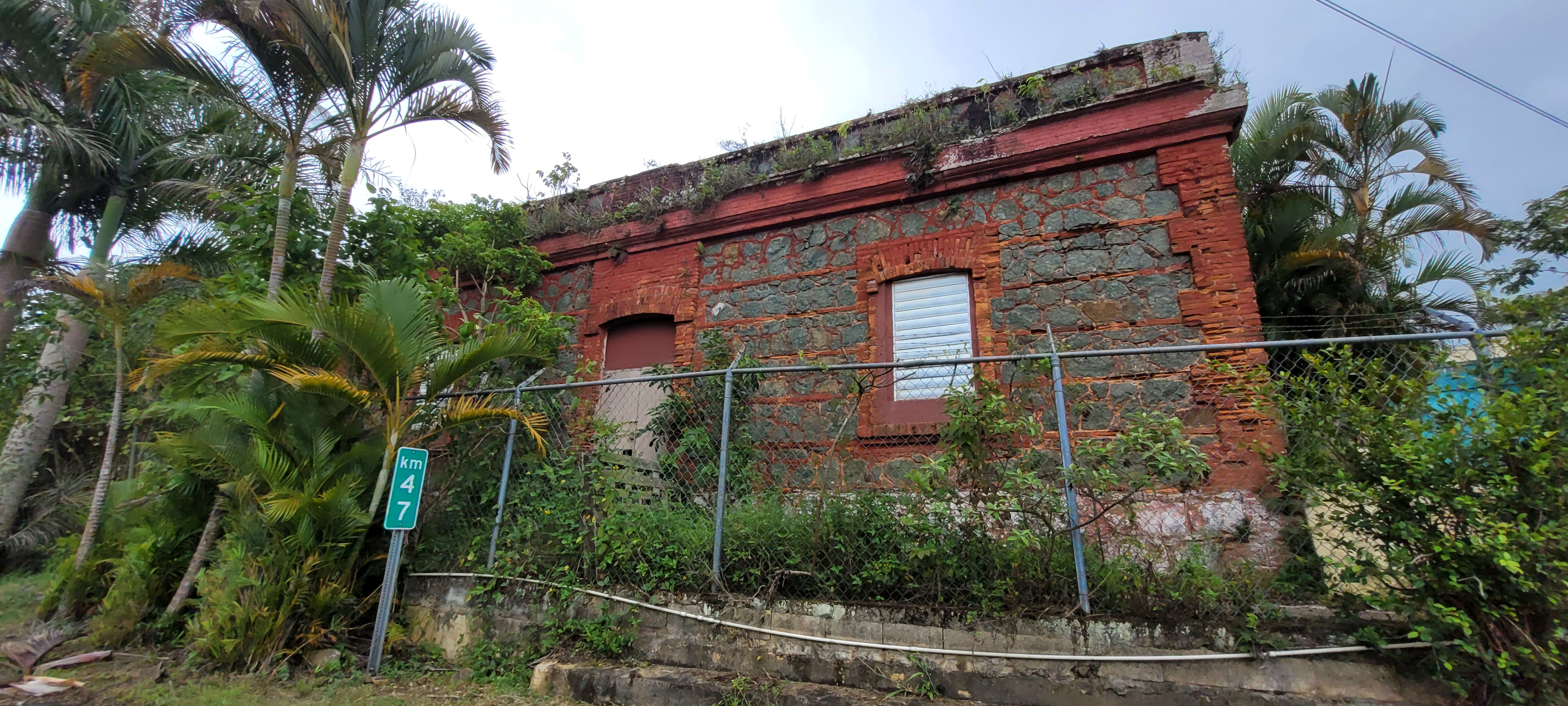
Casilla del Peón Caminero in Beatriz

== See also ==
- List of communities in Puerto Rico
