= Cerro Gregorio =

Mountain in San Lorenzo, Puerto Rico

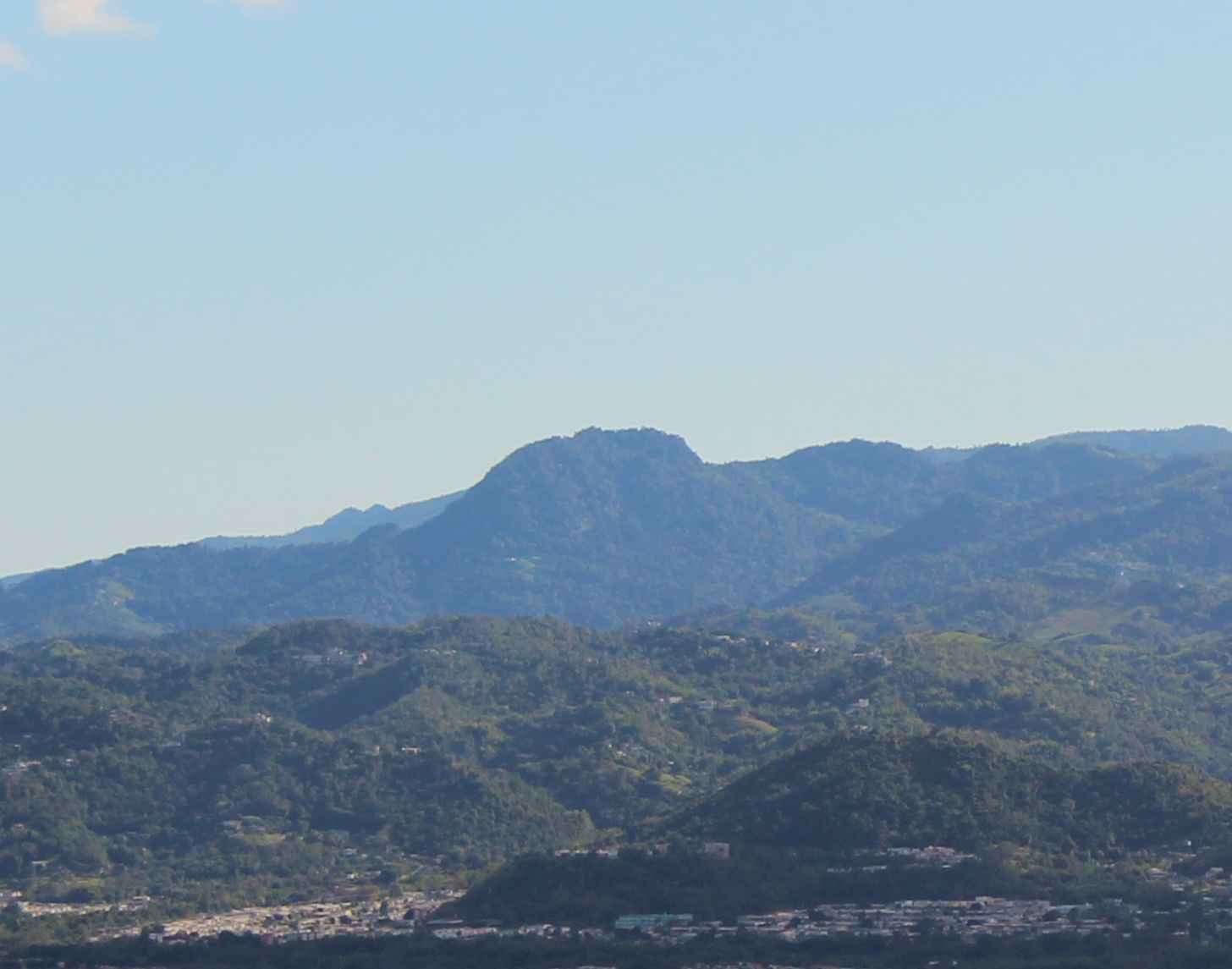
- Cerro Gregorio from Jaguas, Gurabo

Highest point
- Elevation: 623 m (2,044 ft)
- Parent peak: Cerro La Santa
- Coordinates: 18°08′57″N 66°00′43″W

Geography
- Location: San Lorenzo, Puerto Rico
- Parent range: Sierra de Cayey

Cerro Gregorio is a mountain of the Sierra de Cayey measuring 2,043 feet (623 m) in elevation. The mountain is located in the barrios Jagual and Quebrada Honda in the municipality of San Lorenzo, Puerto Rico, close to the municipal boundary with Caguas. The mountain is the site of El Cerro de Nandy, a restaurant and local tourism destination.

The mountain can be seen from many parts of the region, particularly from the Valley of Caguas. The mountain is also considered the "face" of La India Dormida (Spanish for "the sleeping Indian [woman]"), a famous geographical landmark consisting of several mountains that through forced perspective (when seen from the north) form the shape of a sleeping woman.

== Gallery ==
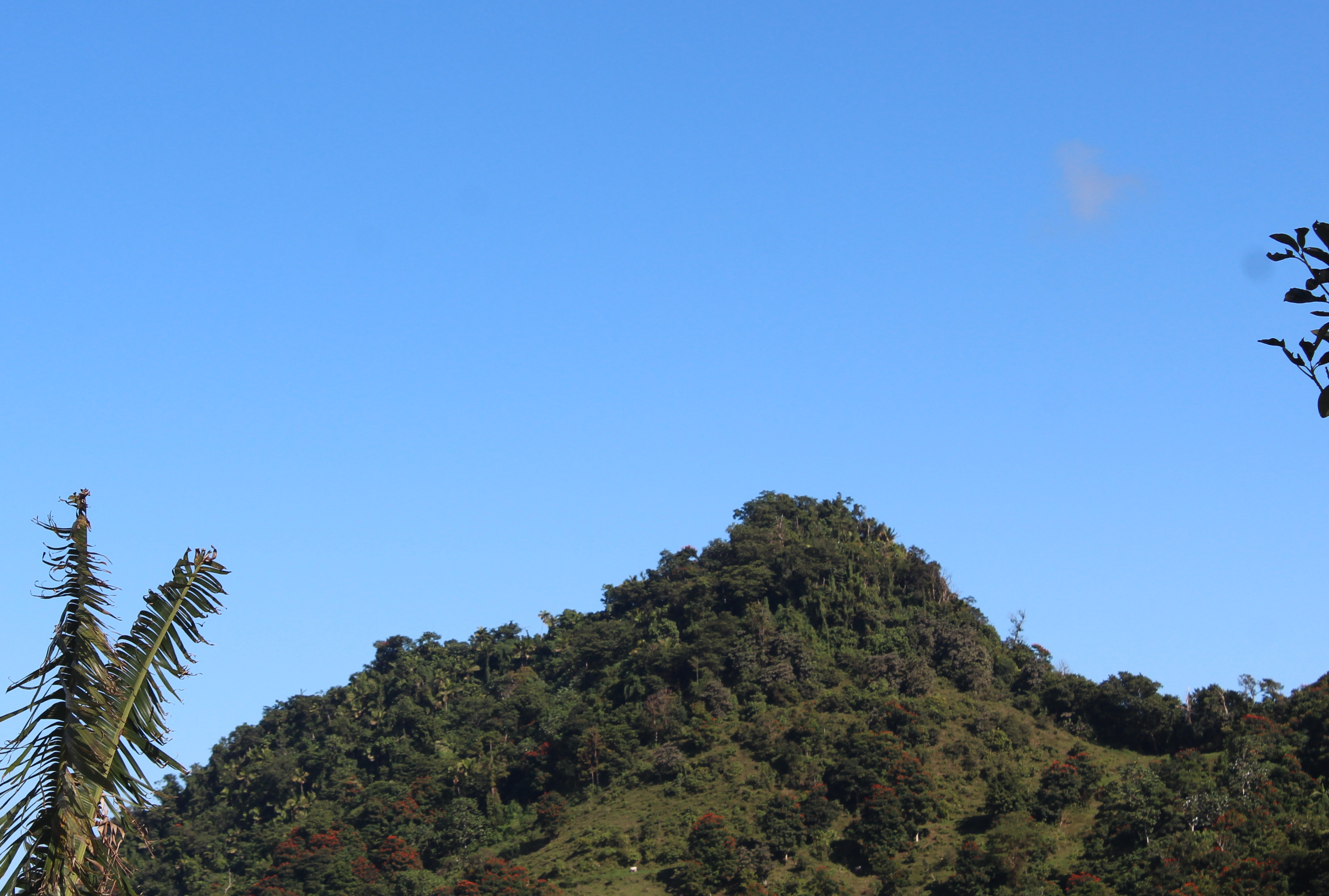
Close-up of the summit from Borinquen, Caguas.

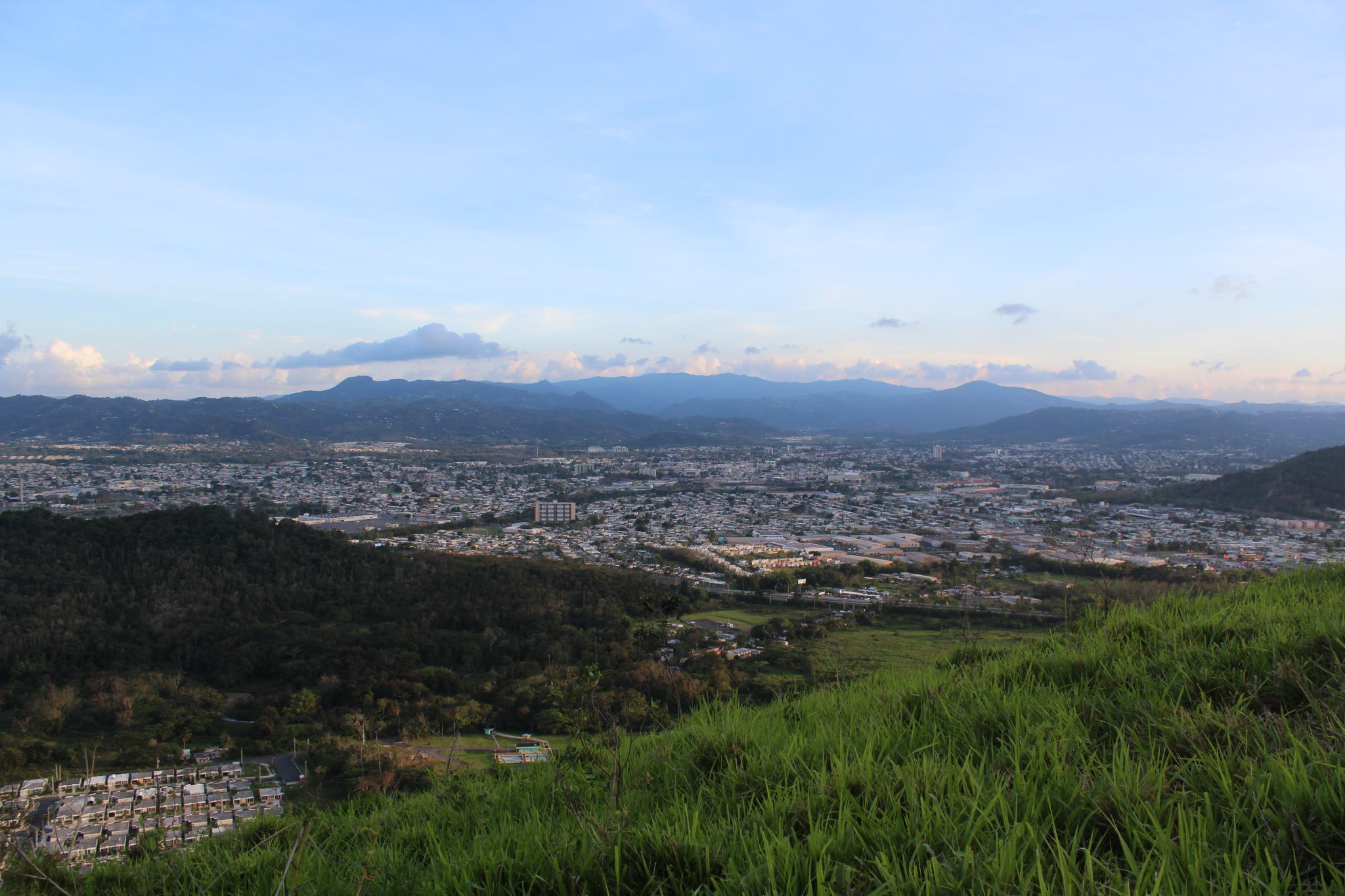
La India Dormida and Sierra de Cayey with Caguas in the foreground.
