= Planadas-Yeyesa Nature Reserve =

Protected nature reserve located in Puerto Rico

Coordinates: 18.085°N 66.218°W

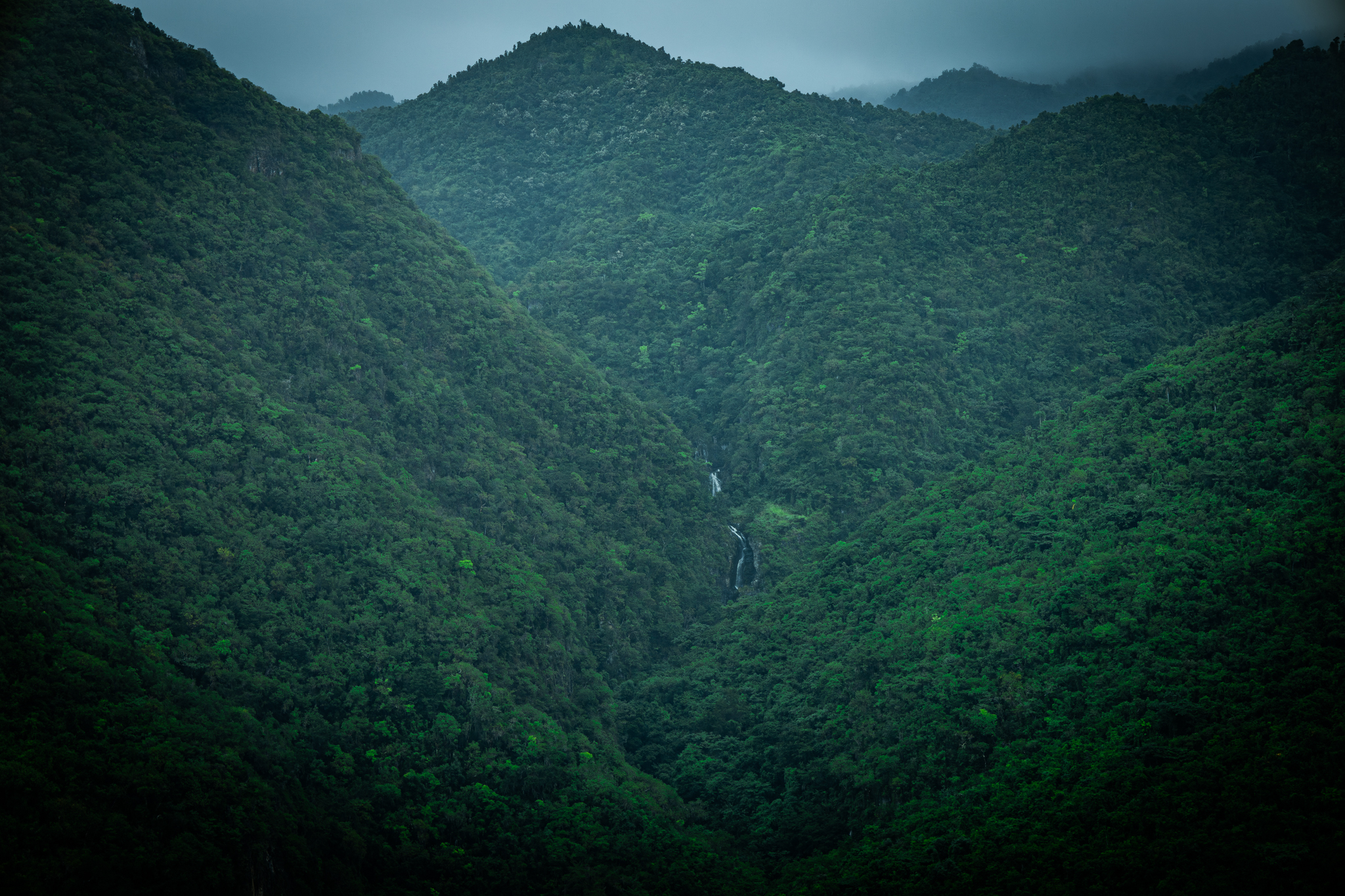
Quebrada Pasto Viejo falls in La Yeyesa from highway PR-52

The Planadas-Yeyesa Nature Reserve (Spanish: Reserva natural Planadas-Yeyesa) is a protected nature reserve located in the Sierra de Cayey, in the municipality of Salinas in central Puerto Rico. The reserve is located close to the famous Cerro Las Tetas (officially Piedras del Collado). Two of the most prominent features of the reserve are Cerro Planada, a 2,480 feet (755 m) high mountain peak, and La Yeyesa, a heavily forested canyon formed by the Lapa River and other streams which feed into the Nigua River. La Yeyesa can be accessed through a lightly trafficked yet moderate trail.

The reserve is home to 198 species of trees and to 11 of the 17 endemic bird species found in Puerto Rico. The forest area is also home to the endangered Puerto Rican boa. In addition to its biodiversity, the reserve is home to several caves, such as El Ceto and La Iglesia Caves, which are home to indigenous Taíno petroglyphs.

== See also ==
- Protected areas of Puerto Rico
