= Lapa, Cayey, Puerto Rico =

Barrio of Puerto Rico

Lapa
- Barrio
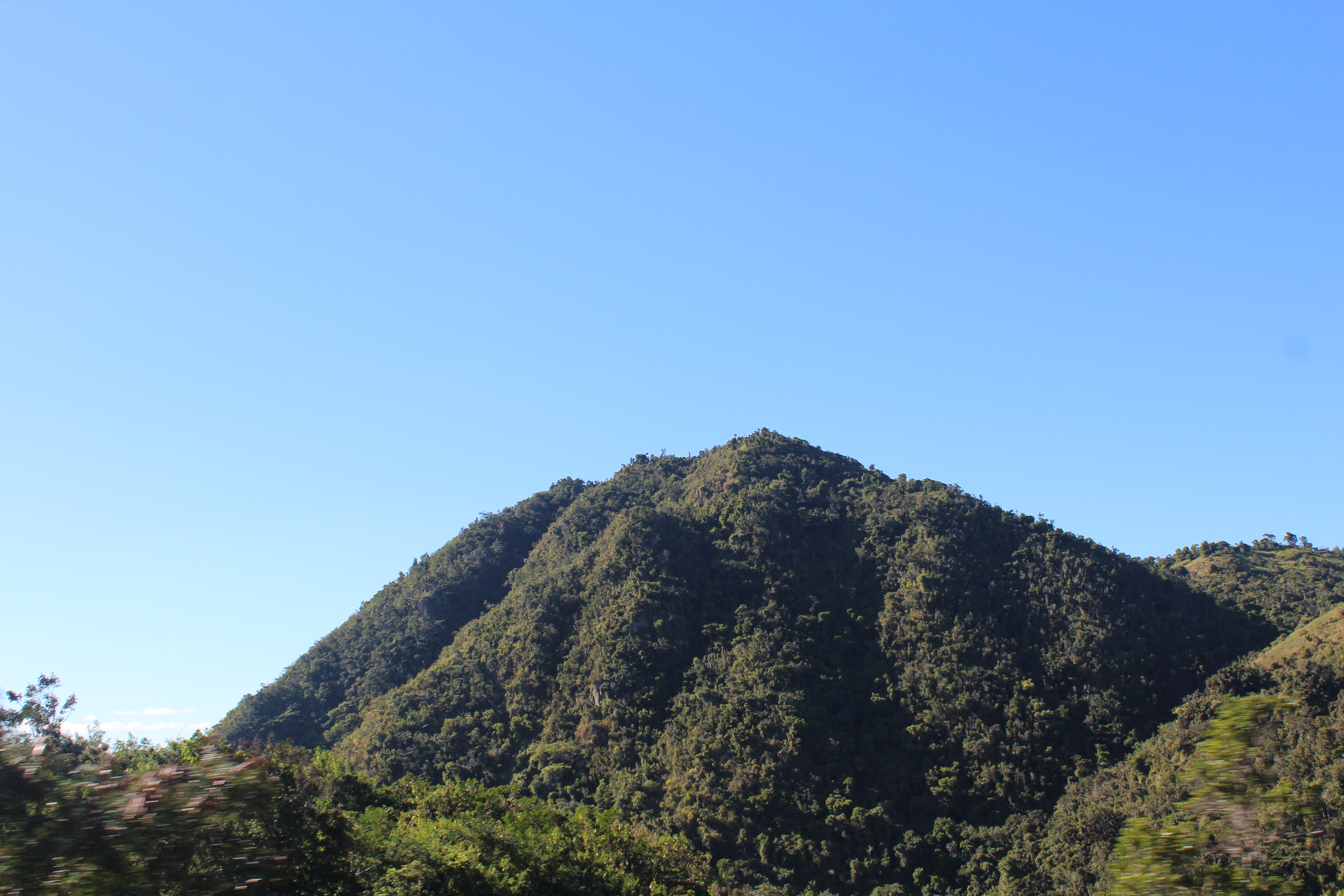
- Cerro Planada in Lapa

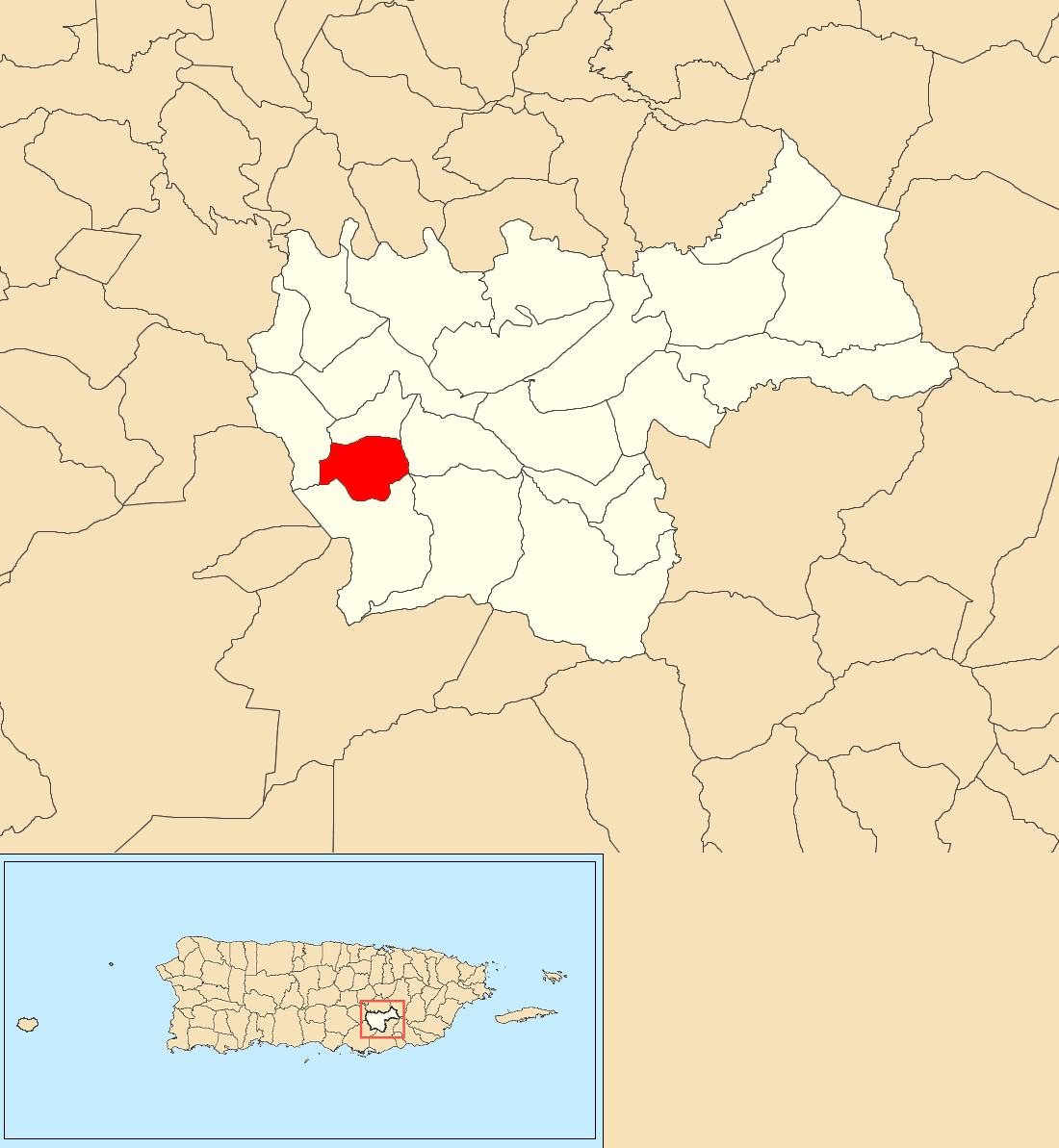
- Location of Lapa within the municipality of Cayey shown in red

- Location of Puerto Rico
- Coordinates: 18°04′59″N 66°11′43″W
- Commonwealth: Puerto Rico
- Municipality: Cayey

Area
  - Total: 1.15 sq mi (3.0 km^{2})
  - Land: 1.15 sq mi (3.0 km^{2})
  - Water: 0 sq mi (0 km^{2})
- Elevation: 2,067 ft (630 m)

Population (2010)
  - Total: 186
  - Density: 161.7/sq mi (62.4/km^{2})
- Source: 2010 Census
- Time zone: UTC−4 (AST)

Lapa is a barrio in the municipality of Cayey, Puerto Rico. Its population in 2010 was 186.

== History ==
Lapa was in Spain's gazetteers until Puerto Rico was ceded by Spain in the aftermath of the Spanish–American War under the terms of the Treaty of Paris of 1898 and became an unincorporated territory of the United States. In 1899, the United States Department of War conducted a census of Puerto Rico finding that the combined population of Lapa and Cercadillo barrios was 1,047.

Historical population
| Census | Pop. | Note | %± |
|---|---|---|---|
| 1910 | 244 | | — |
| 1920 | 260 | | 6.6% |
| 1930 | 356 | | 36.9% |
| 1940 | 293 | | −17.7% |
| 1950 | 299 | | 2.0% |
| 1960 | 156 | | −47.8% |
| 1970 | 184 | | 17.9% |
| 1980 | 152 | | −17.4% |
| 1990 | 195 | | 28.3% |
| 2000 | 234 | | 20.0% |
| 2010 | 186 | | −20.5% |
U.S. Decennial Census; 1900 (N/A) 1910-1930; 1930-1950 1980-2000 2010

== See also ==
- List of communities in Puerto Rico
