= Cerro Las Piñas =

Mountain between Caguas and Cayey, Puerto Rico

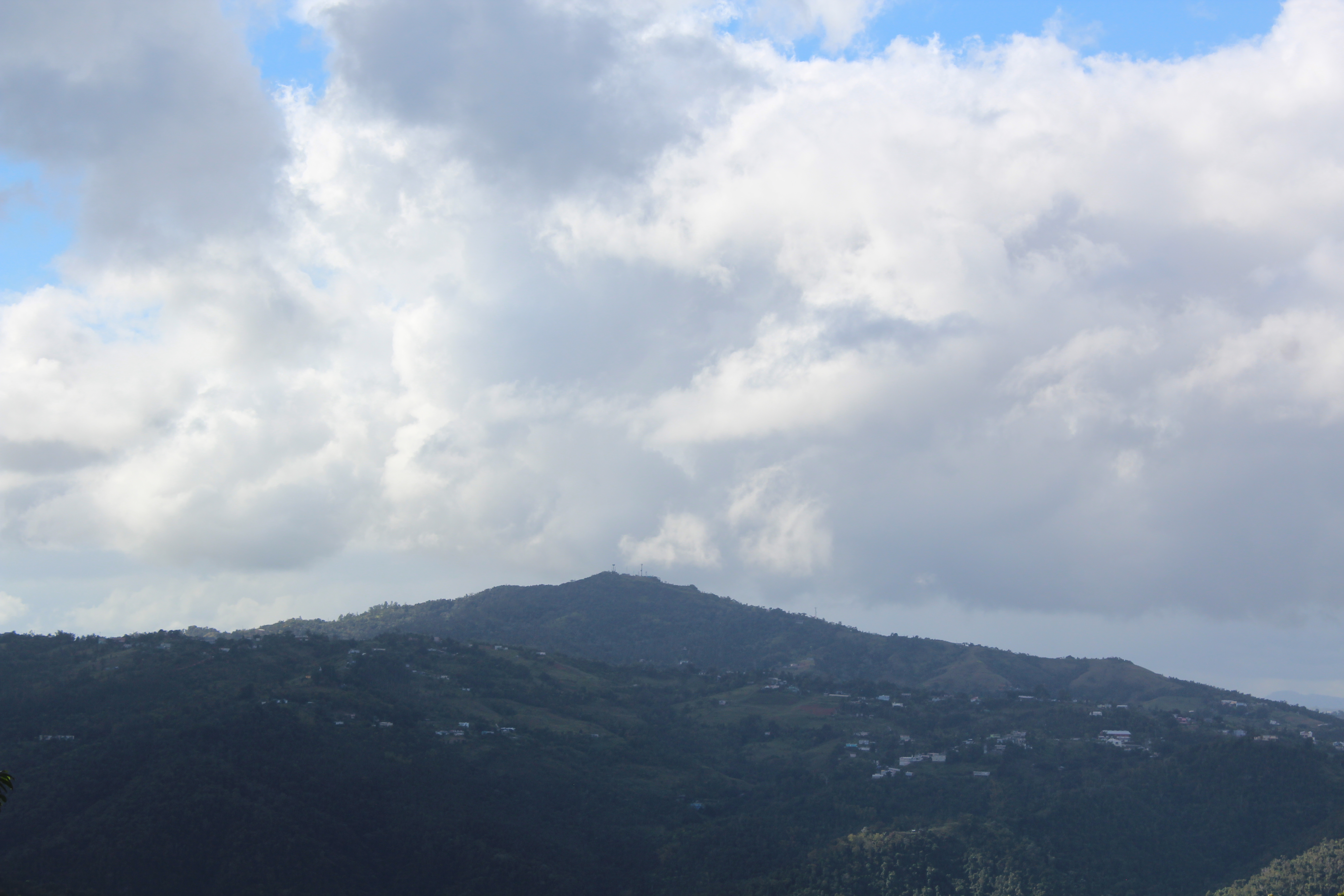

Highest point
- Elevation: 2,425 ft (739 m)
- Prominence: 764 ft (233 m)
- Coordinates: 18.1522°N 66.0855°W

Naming
- Etymology: "the pineapples hill" in Spanish

Geography
- Location: Caguas and Cayey
- Parent range: Sierra de Cayey

Cerro Las Piñas (Spanish for "pineapples hill") is a mountain of the Sierra de Cayey located in the boundary between the municipalities of Caguas and Cayey in central Puerto Rico. The summit is located at 2,425 feet (739 m) above sea level, in the barrios Beatriz of Caguas, and Beatriz and Guavate of Cayey. The summit offers panoramic views of the Valley of Caguas and Cayey.

== Gallery ==
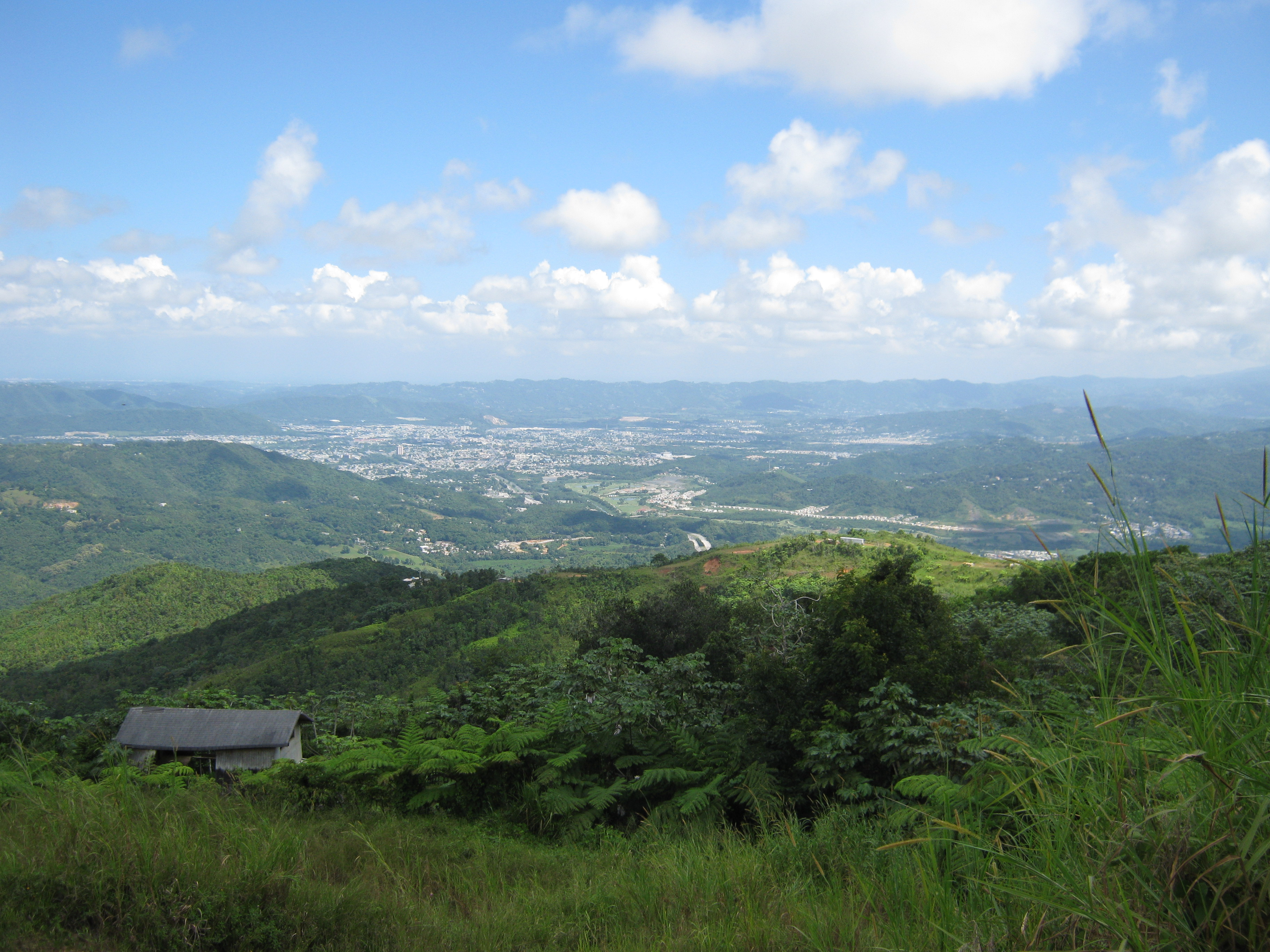
View of the Caguas Valley from the summit

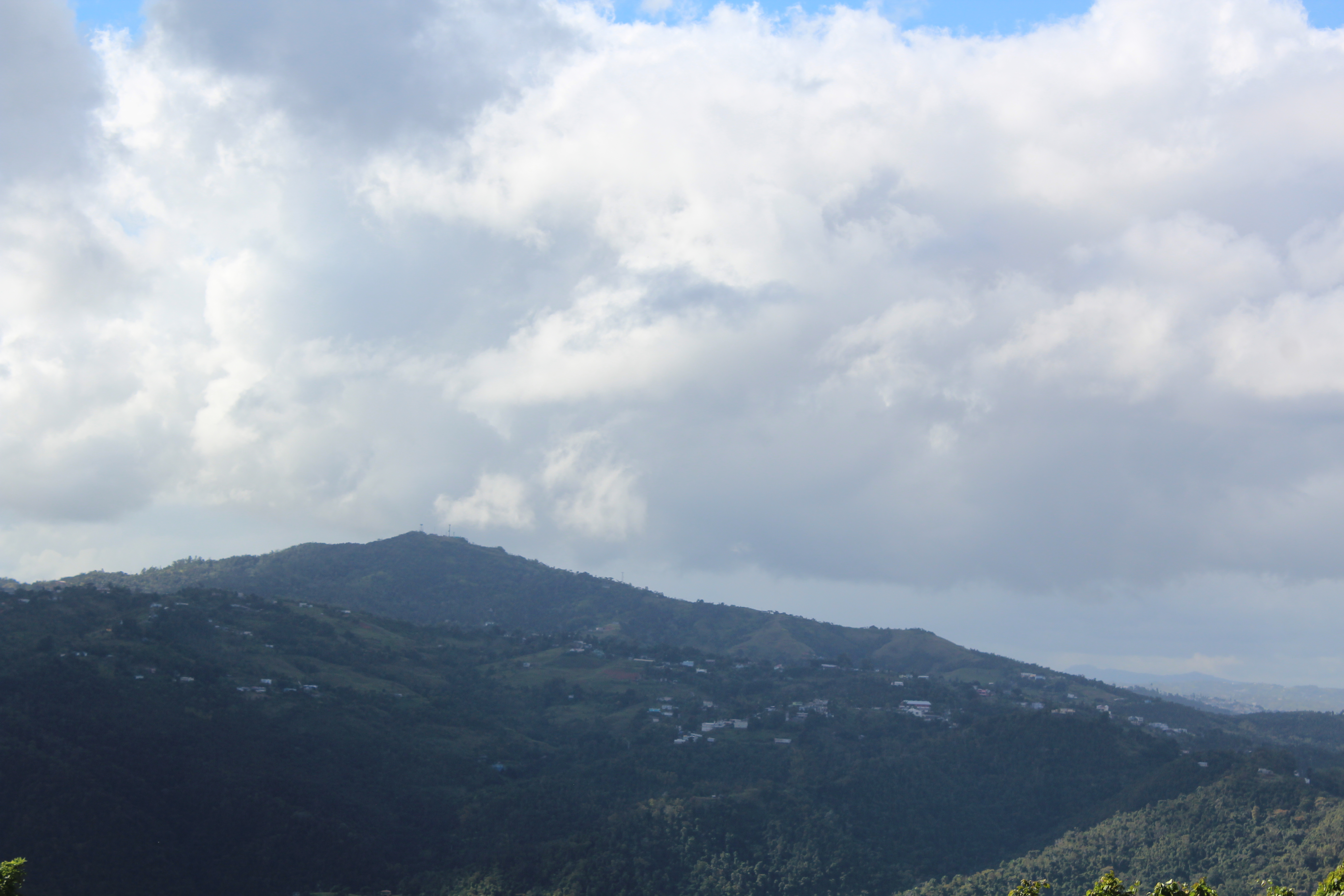
Cerro las Piñas
