= Cerro La Santa =

Mountain in Puerto Rico

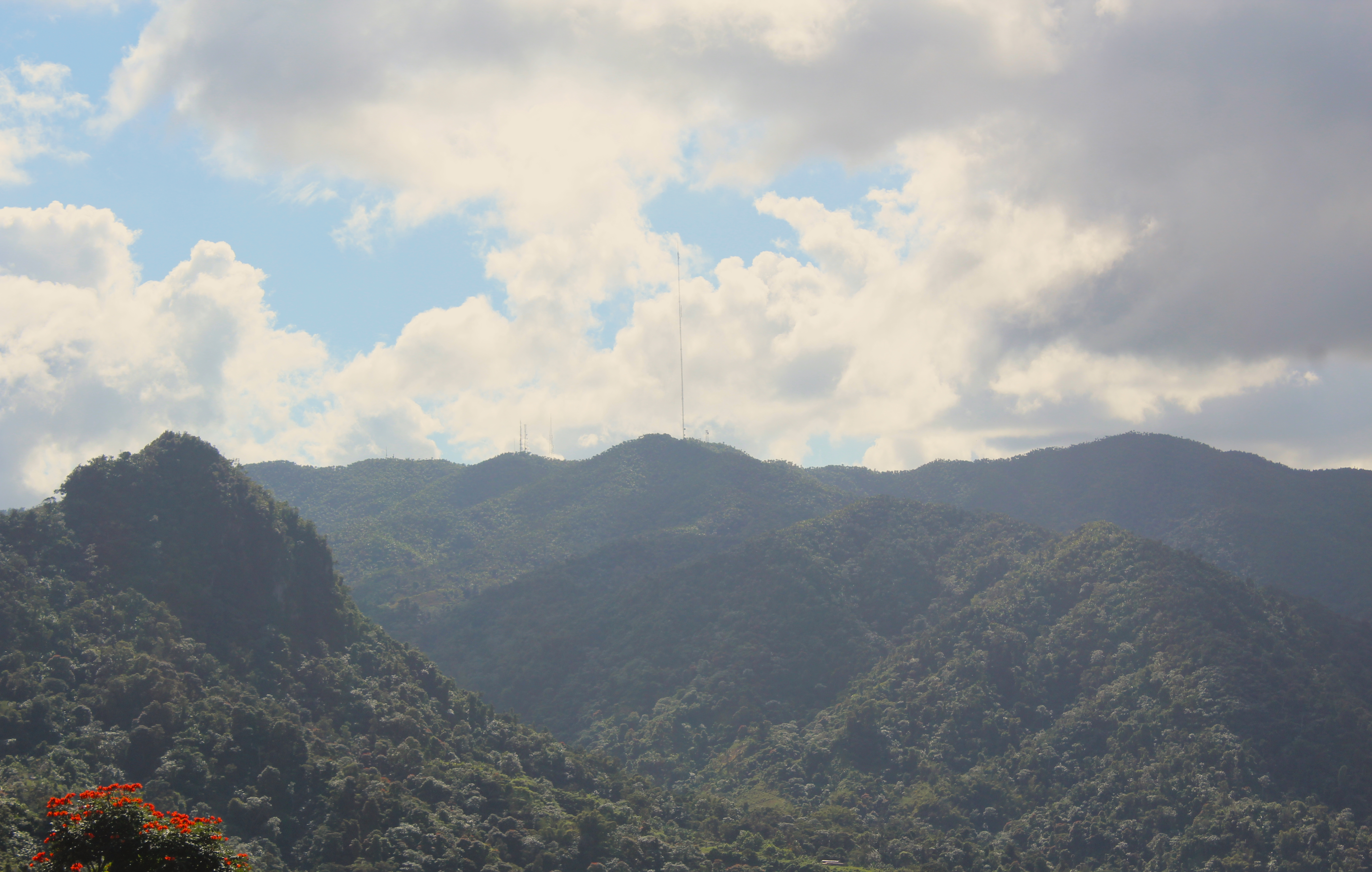
- Cerro La Santa from Borinquen, Caguas

Highest point
- Peak: unnamed WAPA-TV Antena point
- Elevation: 2,965.6 ft (903.9 m)
- Prominence: 1,142.4 ft (348.2 m)
- Isolation: 18.1 mi (29.1 km)
- Coordinates: 18°06′48″N 66°03′09″W

Naming
- Etymology: "hill of the saint" or "hill of the holy woman" in Spanish

Geography
- Location within Puerto Rico
- Location: Caguas, Cayey, San Lorenzo
- Parent range: Sierra de Cayey

Cerro La Santa is a 2,962 feet (903 m) high mountain and the highest point in the Sierra de Cayey in Puerto Rico. The peak of Cerro La Santa is located in the Carite State Forest, at a tri-point shared by the municipalities of Caguas (San Salvador), Cayey (Farallón) and San Lorenzo (Espino).

== Geography ==
Cerro La Santa is the highest point in the Sierra de Cayey, a subrange of the Central Mountain Range (Cordillera Central) of Puerto Rico. Cerro Lucero, also located within the massif, follows close by with an elevation of 2,831 feet (862 m). Although not located at the peak of the mountain, the highest point of the municipalities of Guayama and Patillas is also found within the Cerro La Santa mountain massif. The summit of Cerro La Santa is located close to PR-184. With the exception of the tall antennas which provide signal to Puerto Rico's principal TV stations such as WKAQ-TV and WAPA-TV, these mountains are heavily forested by Sierra palm trees (Prestoea montana). These forest tracts are protected under the jurisdiction of the Carite State Forest.

The Loíza River (Spanish: Río Grande De Loíza) has its source close to the summit in barrio Espino in San Lorenzo.

== Gallery ==
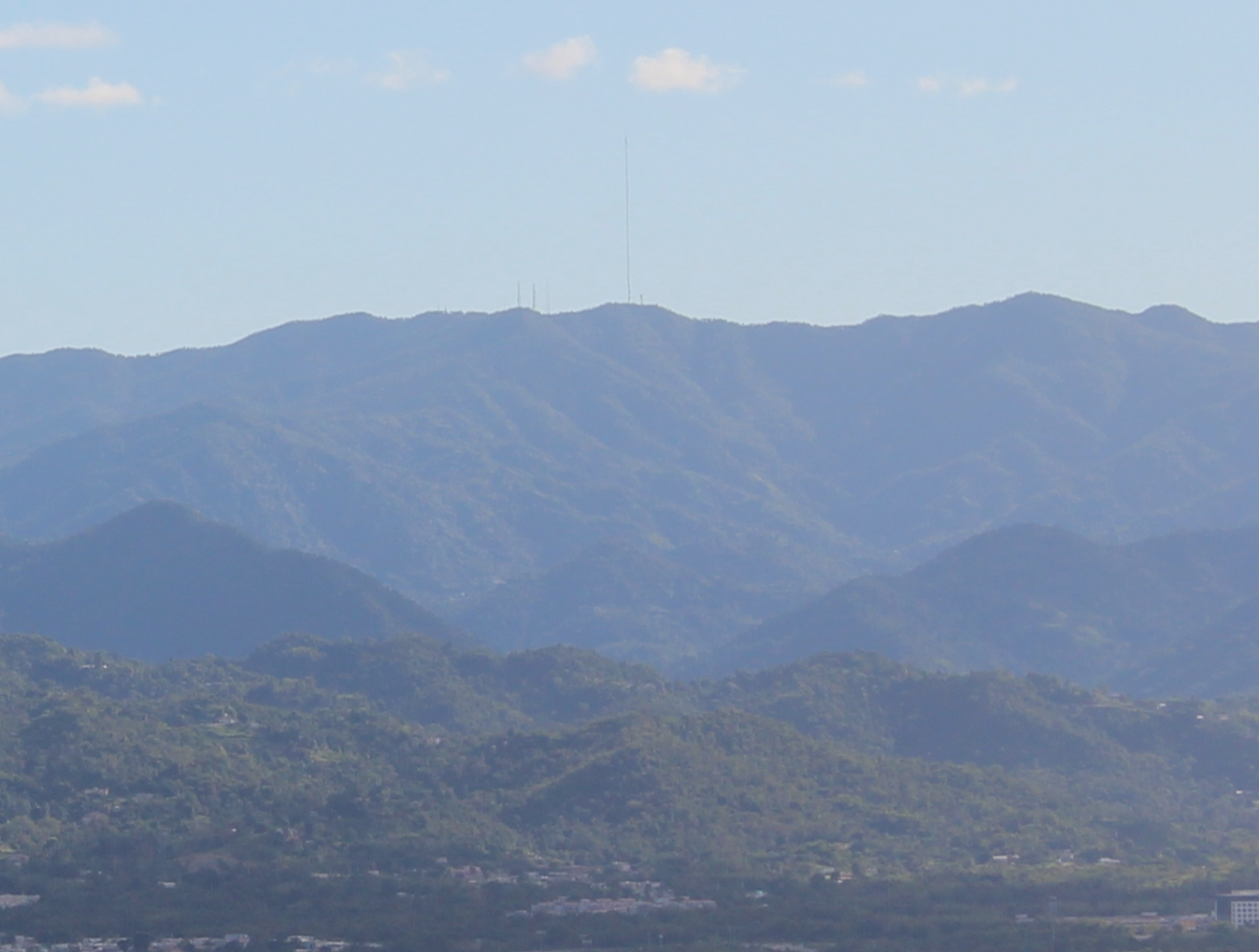
Cerro La Santa from Jaguas, Gurabo.

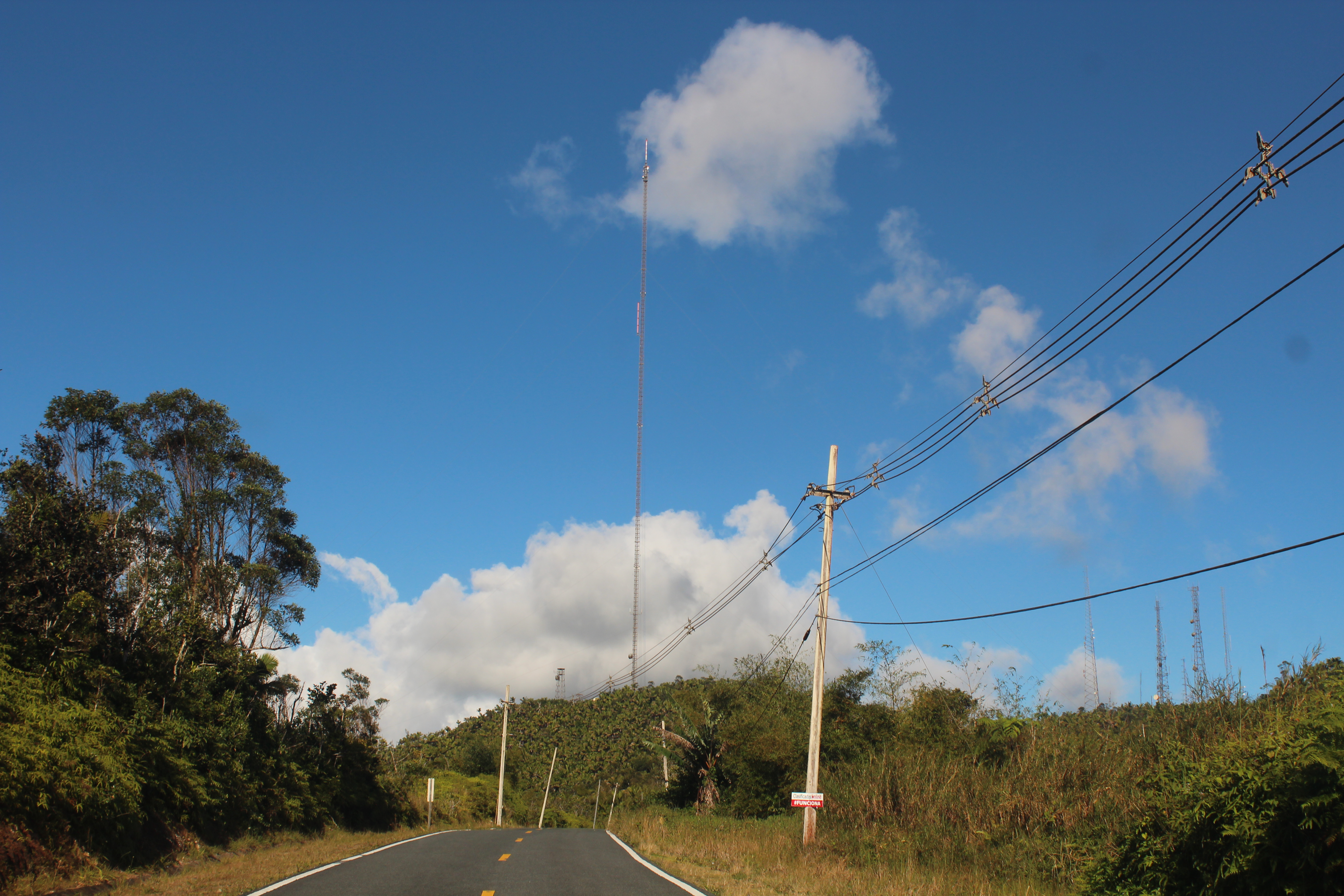
View of the antennas at the summit from highway PR-184.

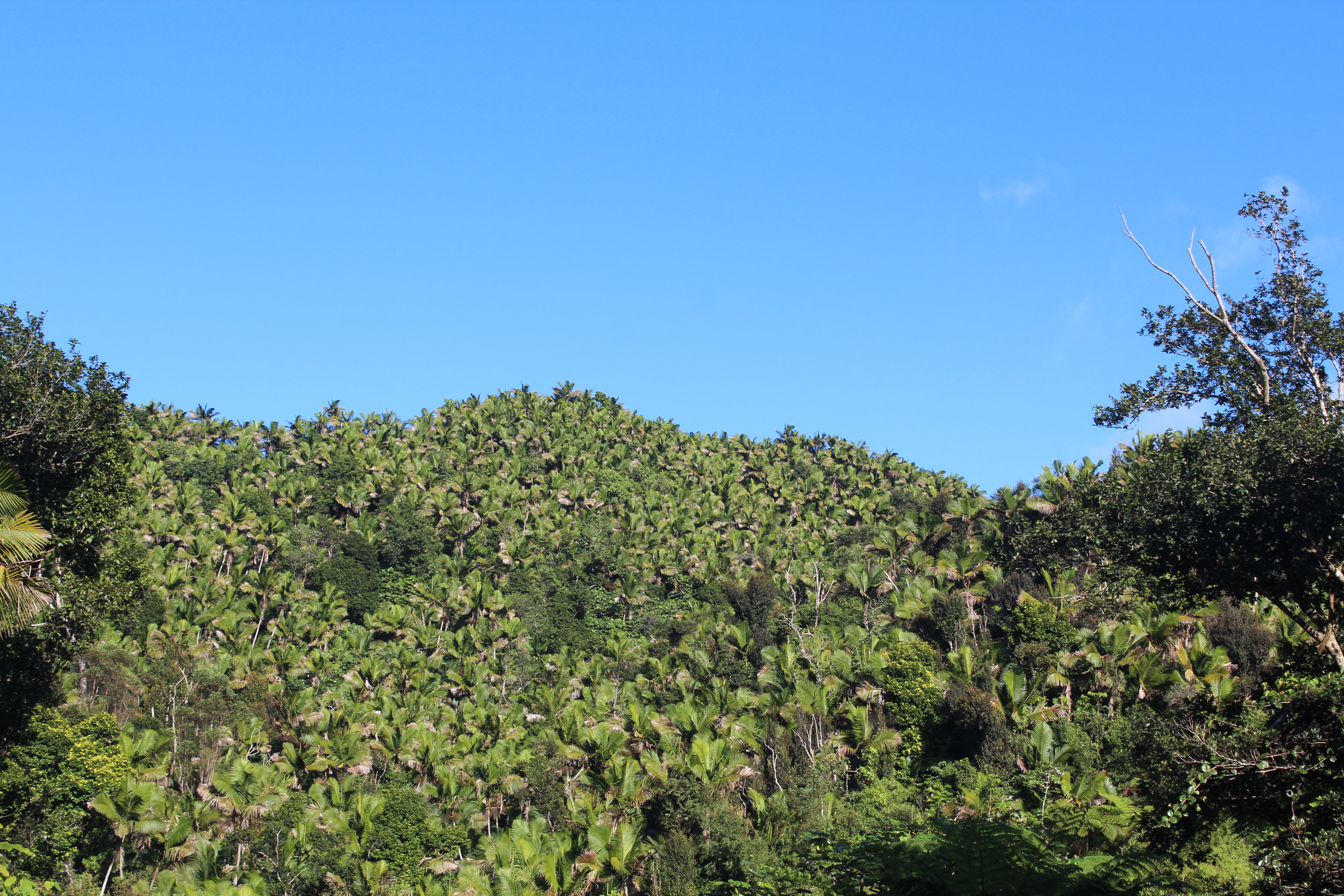
Sierra palm forest near the summit.

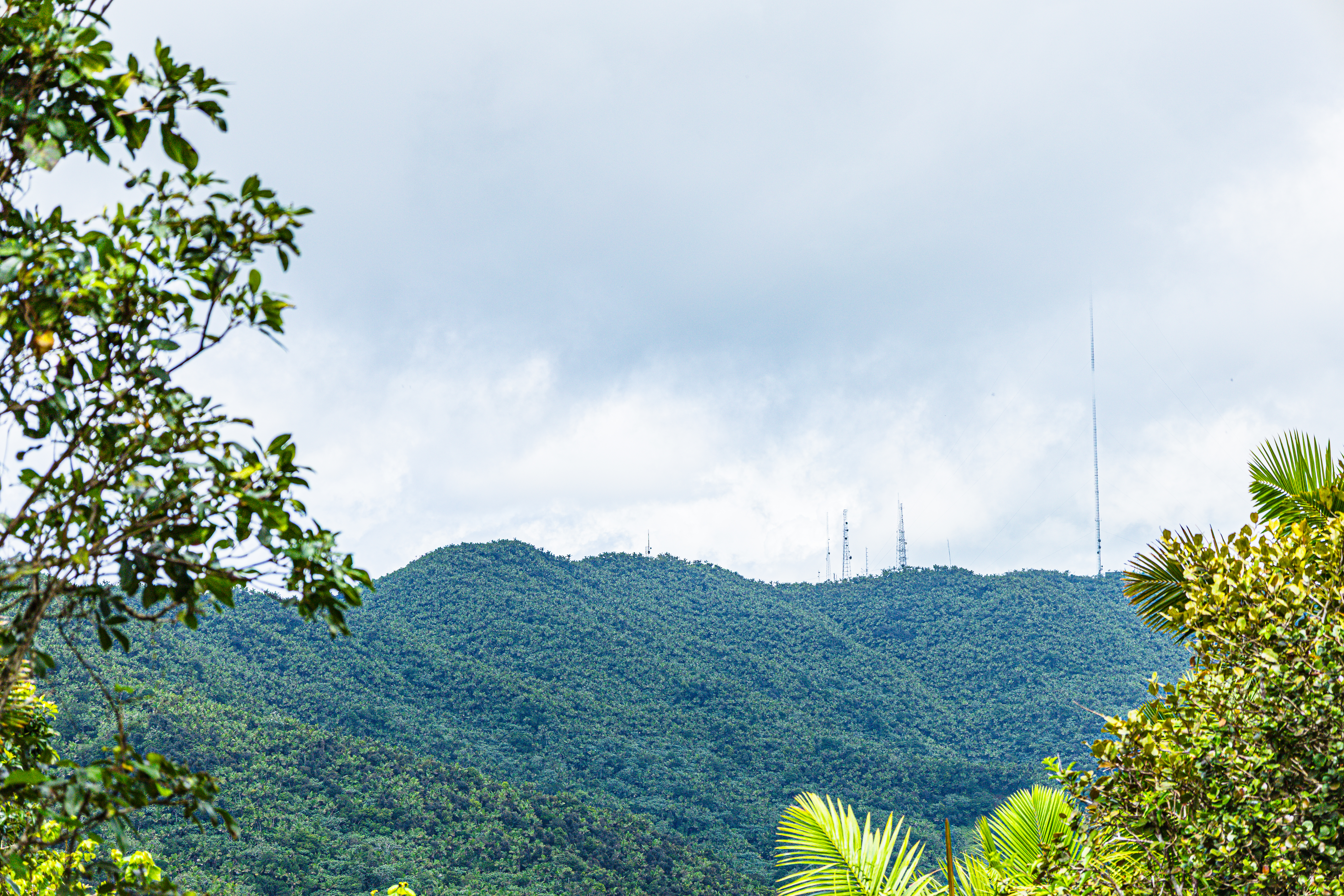
Cerro La Santa from Montaña Santa

== See also ==
- Sierra de Cayey
