= Cerro Planada =

Mountain peak in Puerto Rico

- Cerro Planadas
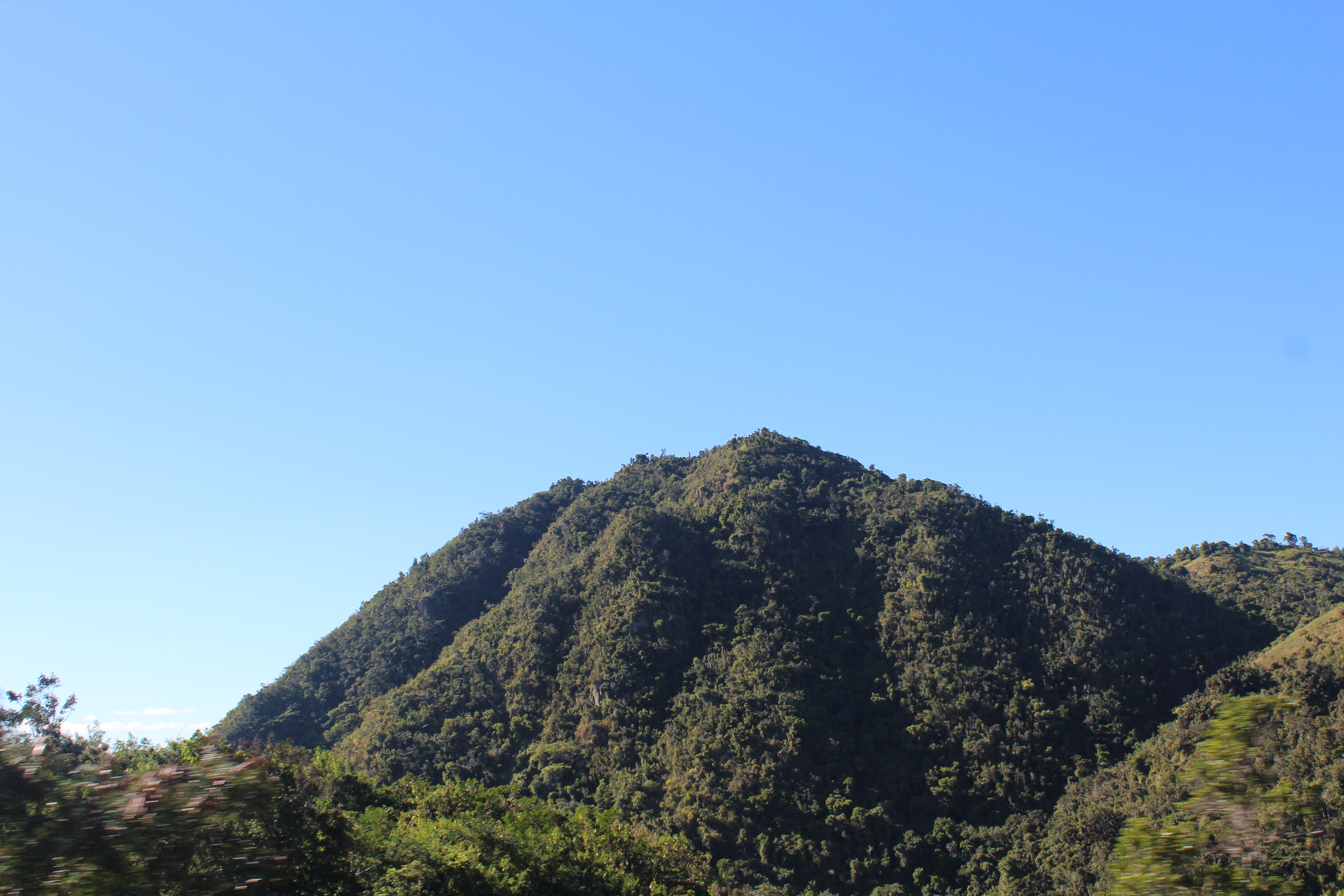
- Cerro Planada from PR-52

Highest point
- Elevation: 2,480 ft (760 m)
- Coordinates: 18°05′12″N 66°12′32″W

Geography
- Location: Cayey, Puerto Rico
- Parent range: Sierra de Cayey

Cerro Planada is a mountain peak located in Cayey, Puerto Rico. The mountain has an elevation of 2,480 feet (755 m), making it the 10th highest peak of the Sierra de Cayey.

Cerro Planada is located in the boundary between the barrios (districts) of Lapa and Pasto Viejo. The mountain forms part of the Planadas-Yeyesa Nature Reserve, located in the municipalities of Cayey and Salinas.
