= Sierra de Cayey =

Mountain subrange in Puerto Rico

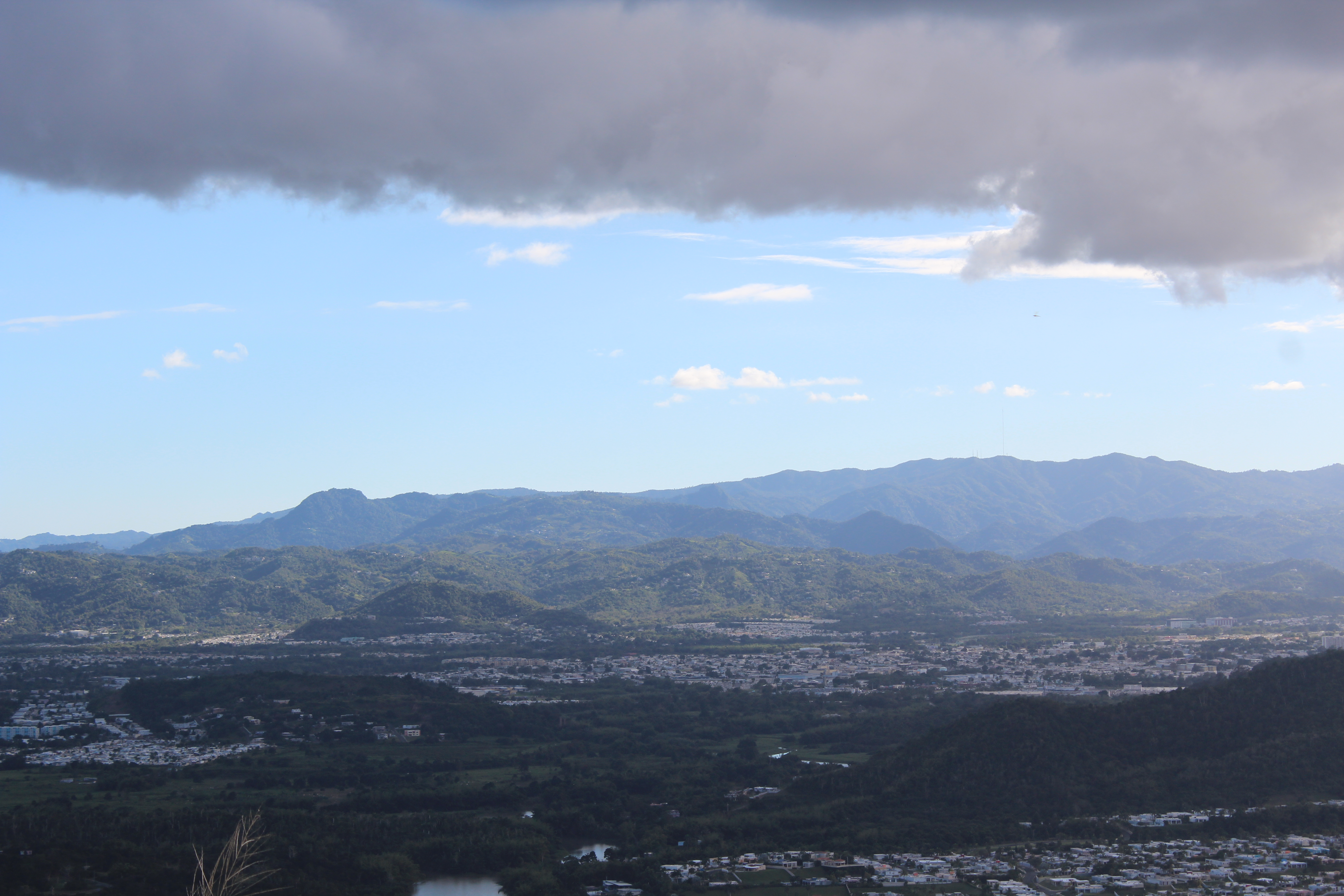
- Sierra de Cayey from the northern municipality of Gurabo

Highest point
- Peak: Cerro La Santa
- Elevation: 2,962 ft (903 m)

Geography
- Location: Puerto Rico
- Parent range: Cordillera Central

The Sierra de Cayey (English: "Cayey Mountains") is one of three subranges of the Cordillera Central mountain range in the main island of Puerto Rico. It is demarcated from the eponymous main subrange of Cordillera Central by the San Cristóbal Canyon on the town boundary between the municipalities of Barranquitas and Aibonito. From west to east, it is concentrated in the municipalities of Aibonito, Cayey, Guayama, and Patillas in the southeastern region of the island. The summit of the mountain range is Cerro La Santa at 2,962 ft. (903 m) and its most recognizable peak is Cerro Las Tetas at 2,759 ft. (840 m). Along with the Sierra de Luquillo in northeastern Puerto Rico, the Cayey mountain range is the smaller subrange of the Cordillera Central.

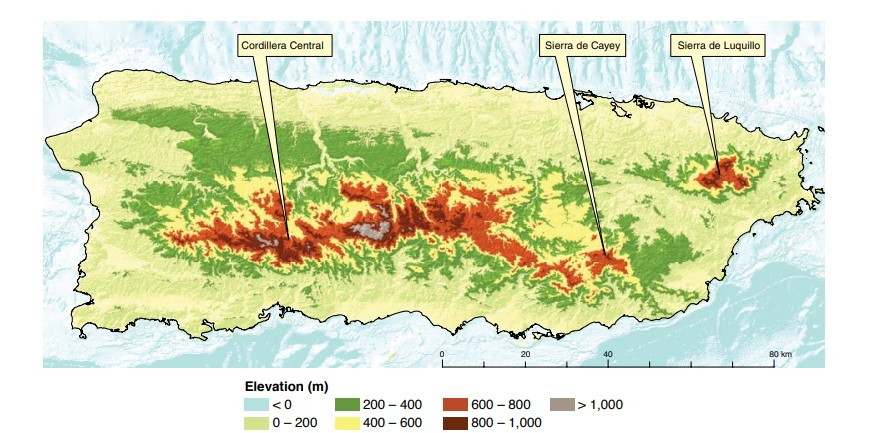
Topographic map of Puerto Rico showing the Sierra de Cayey in the southeast

The Rio Grande de Loíza, which is one of the largest rivers in Puerto Rico, has its sources in this range within the municipality of San Lorenzo. The La Plata River flows through the Cayey Valley where the town of Cayey is located on the northern slope of the range. There are tobacco and coffee crops in the area.

== Highest summits ==
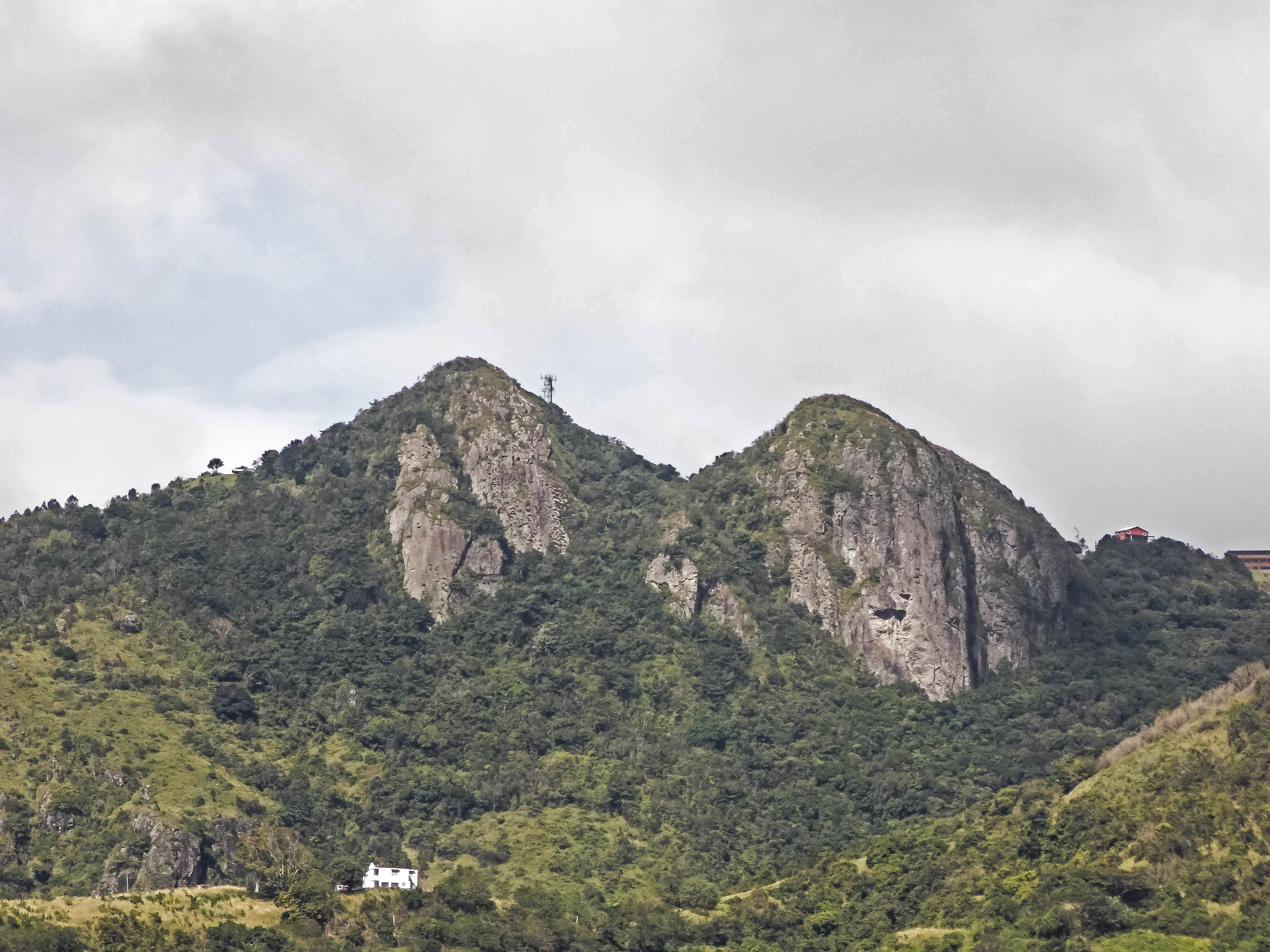
Cerro Las Tetas, part of the Cayey mountain range

The following peaks are some of the highest summits in the Sierra de Cayey:

1. Cerro La Santa - 2,962 ft. (903 m)
2. Cerro Lucero - 2,831 ft. (862 m)
3. Cerro de la Tabla - 2,808 ft. (855 m)
4. Cerro Honoré - 2,795 ft. (851 m)
5. Cerro Avispa - 2,778 ft. (846 m)
6. Cerro Las Tetas - 2,759 ft. (840 m)
7. Monte El Gato - 2,673 ft. (814 m)
8. Peña Domingo - 2,637 ft. (803 m)
9. Peñon de los Soldados - 2,552 ft. (777 m)
10. Cerro Planada - 2,480 ft. (755 m)

Other notable mountains in the Sierra de Cayey are the Cerro Gregorio, Cerro Las Piñas, the Sierra de Jájome and Piedra de Degetau.
