= Borinquen, Caguas, Puerto Rico =

Barrio of Puerto Rico

Borinquen
- Barrio
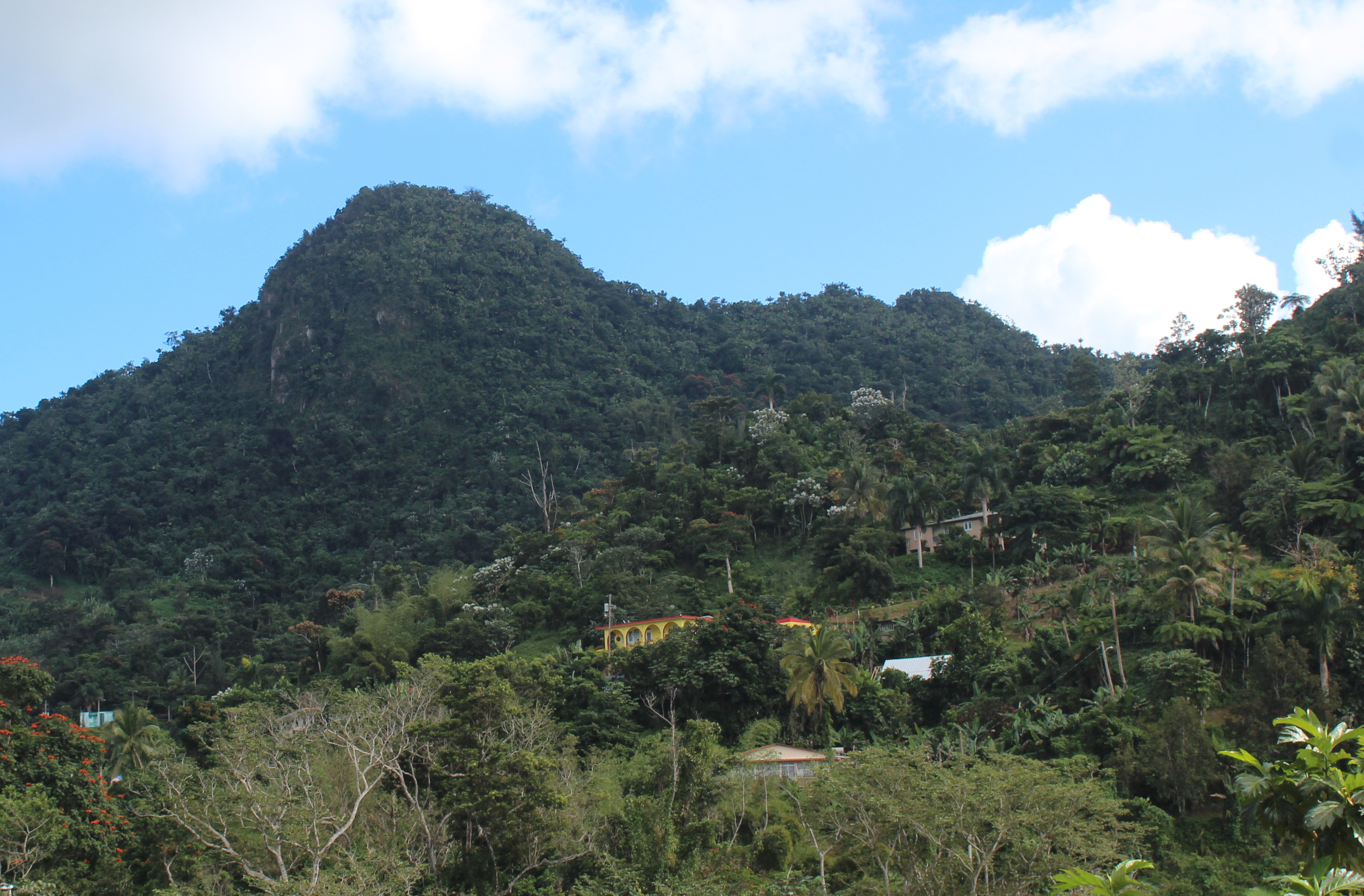
- Mountain and homes in Borinquen

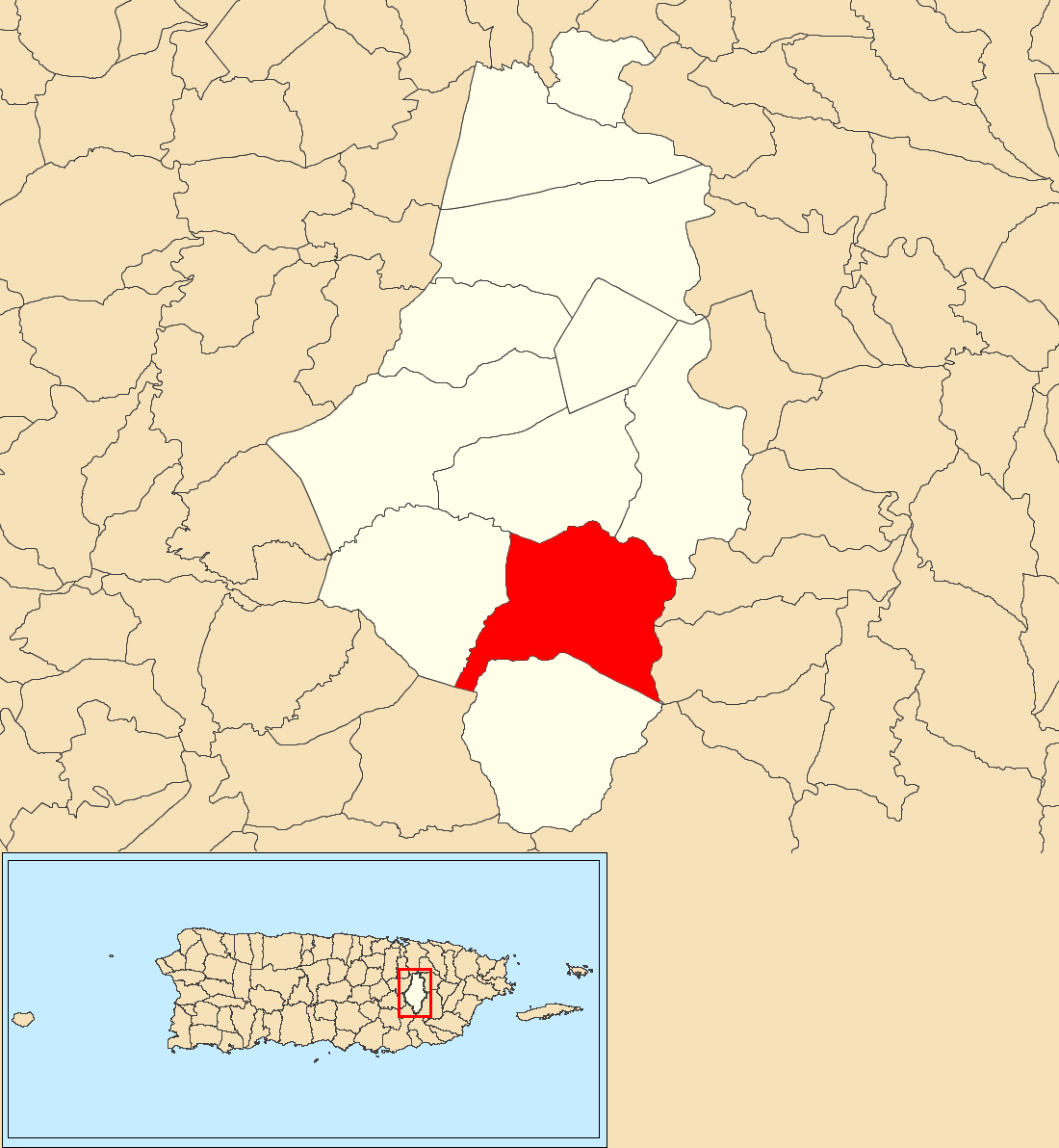
- Location of Borinquen within the municipality of Caguas shown in red

- Location of Puerto Rico
- Coordinates: 18°10′12″N 66°02′26″W
- Commonwealth: Puerto Rico
- Municipality: Caguas

Area
  - Total: 6.27 sq mi (16.2 km^{2})
  - Land: 6.27 sq mi (16.2 km^{2})
  - Water: 0.00 sq mi (0 km^{2})
- Elevation: 433 ft (132 m)

Population (2020)
  - Total: 7,251
  - Density: 1,160/sq mi (447/km^{2})
- Source: 2020 Census
- Time zone: UTC−4 (AST)
- ZIP Code: 00725, 00726, 00727
- Area codes: 787, 939

Borinquen is a barrio in the municipality of Caguas, Puerto Rico. Its population in 2020 was 7,251. The barrio is named after the indigenous Taíno name for Puerto Rico, "Borinquen," which highlights the area's historical significance.

== History and demographics ==
Borinquen was in Spain's gazetteers until Puerto Rico was ceded by Spain in the aftermath of the Spanish–American War under the terms of the Treaty of Paris of 1898 and became an unincorporated territory of the United States. In 1899, the United States Department of War conducted a census of Puerto Rico finding that the combined population of Borinquen barrio and Bairoa barrio was 3,870.

Historical population
Census	Pop.	Note	%±
1910	2,189		—
1920	2,724		24.4%
1930	3,196		17.3%
1940	3,081		−3.6%
1950	3,027		−1.8%
1960	3,274		8.2%
1970	3,272		−0.1%
1980	4,001		22.3%
1990	5,172		29.3%
2000	6,522		26.1%
2010	7,953		21.9%
2020	7,251		−8.8%
U.S. Decennial Census; 1900 (N/A) 1910-1930; 1930-1950 1980-2000 2010 2020

== Places of interest ==
- Caguas Real Golf and Country Club, partially located in Borinquen.
- Charco El Cantil, natural swimming pool on the Turabo River.
- Plaza Turabo, a riverside park located along the Turabo River.
- Terrazas de Borinquen Recreational Area, community pool and park.

== Gallery ==
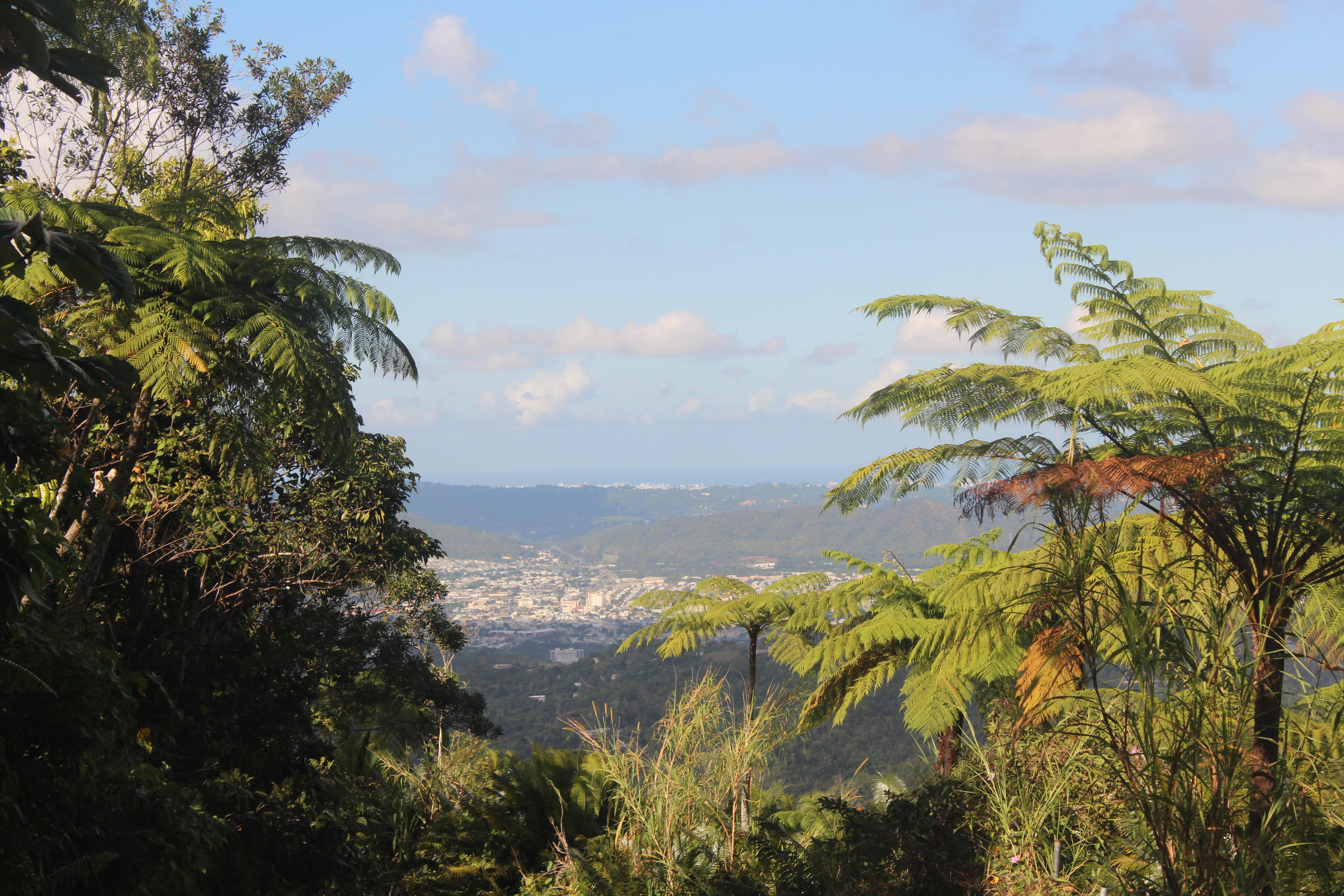
Caguas Valley from Borinquen

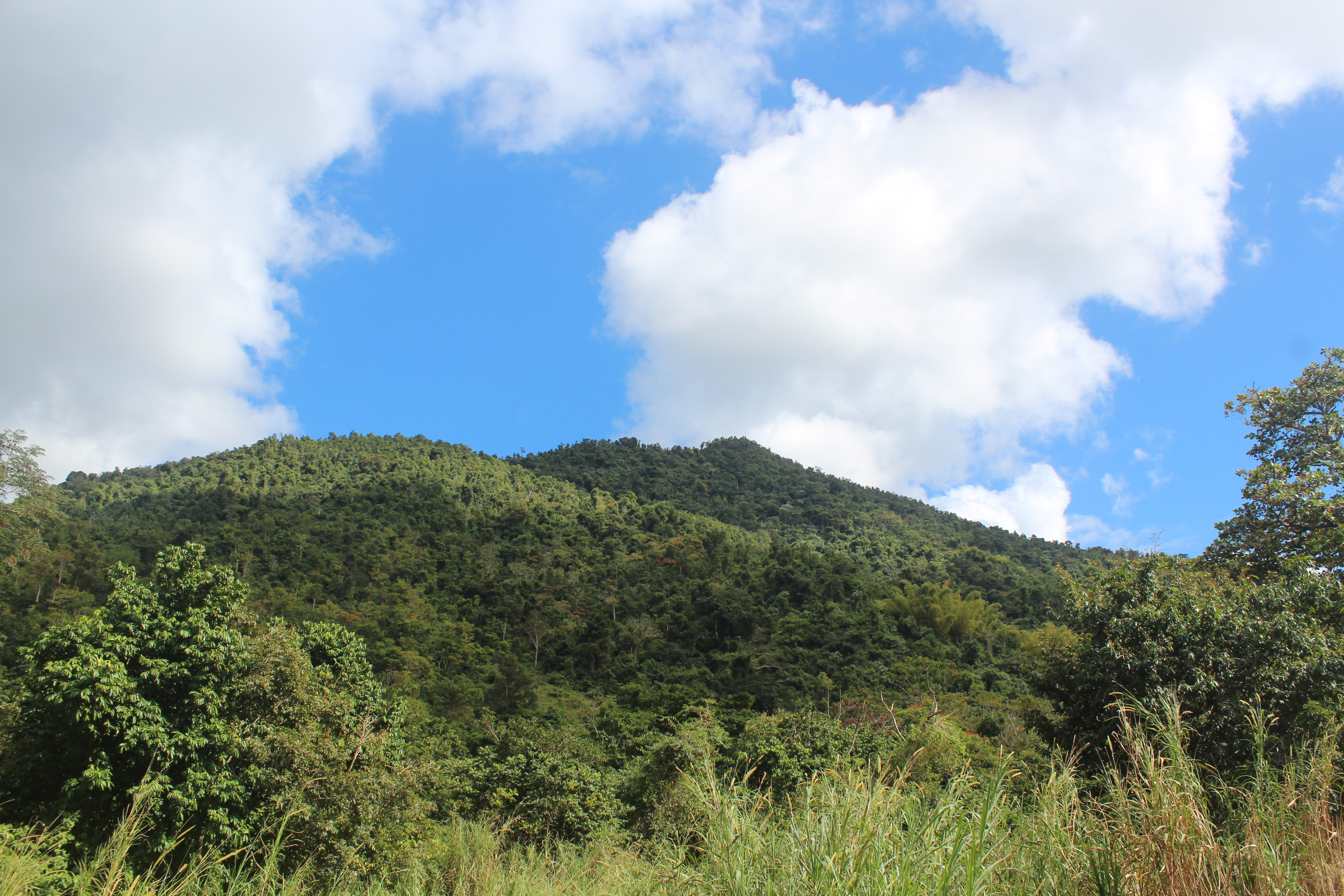
Mountains near Borinquen

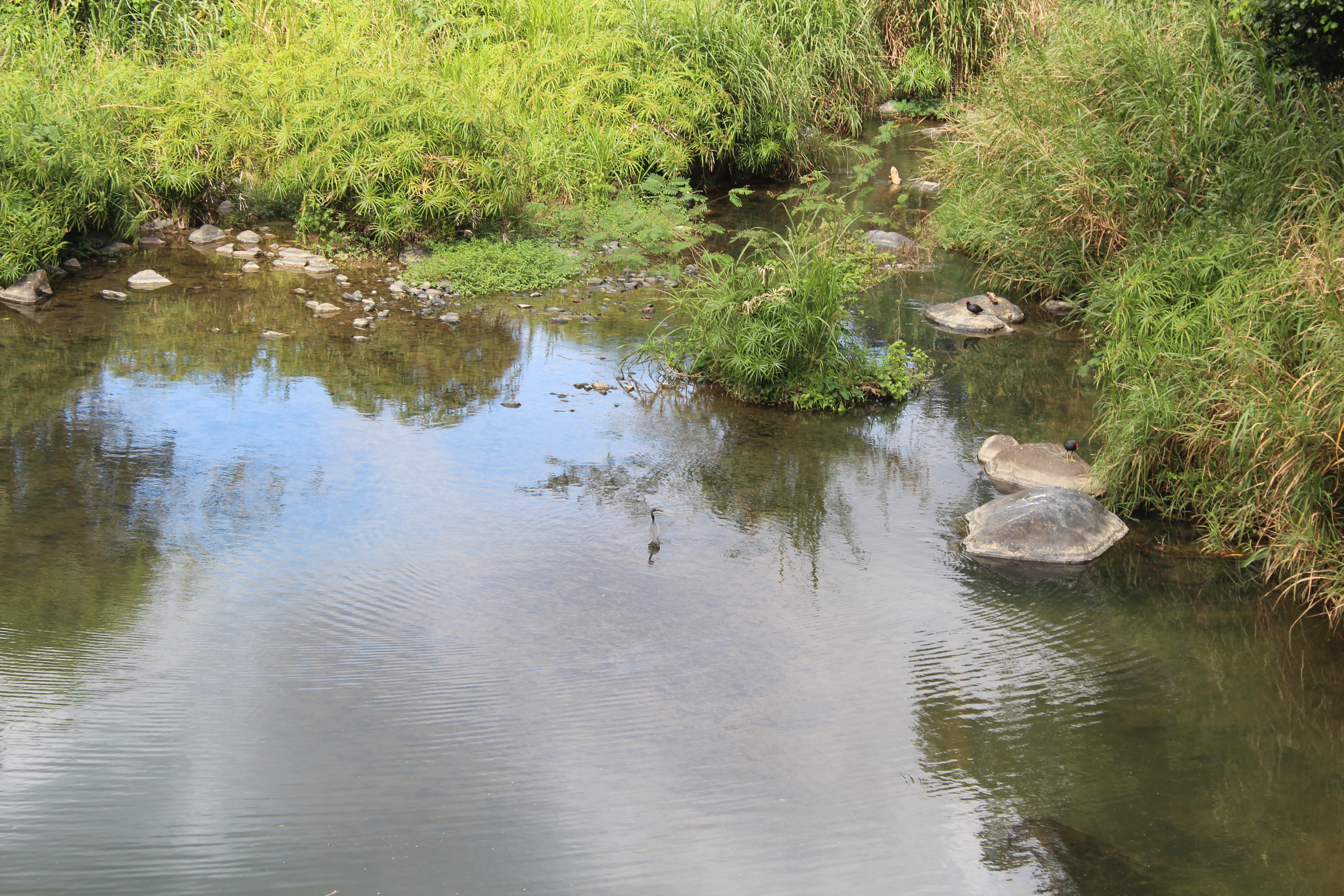
Charco El Cantil

== See also ==
- List of communities in Puerto Rico
