= Caguas, Puerto Rico =

City and municipality in Puerto Rico

Caguas
- City and municipality
- Municipio Autónomo de Caguas
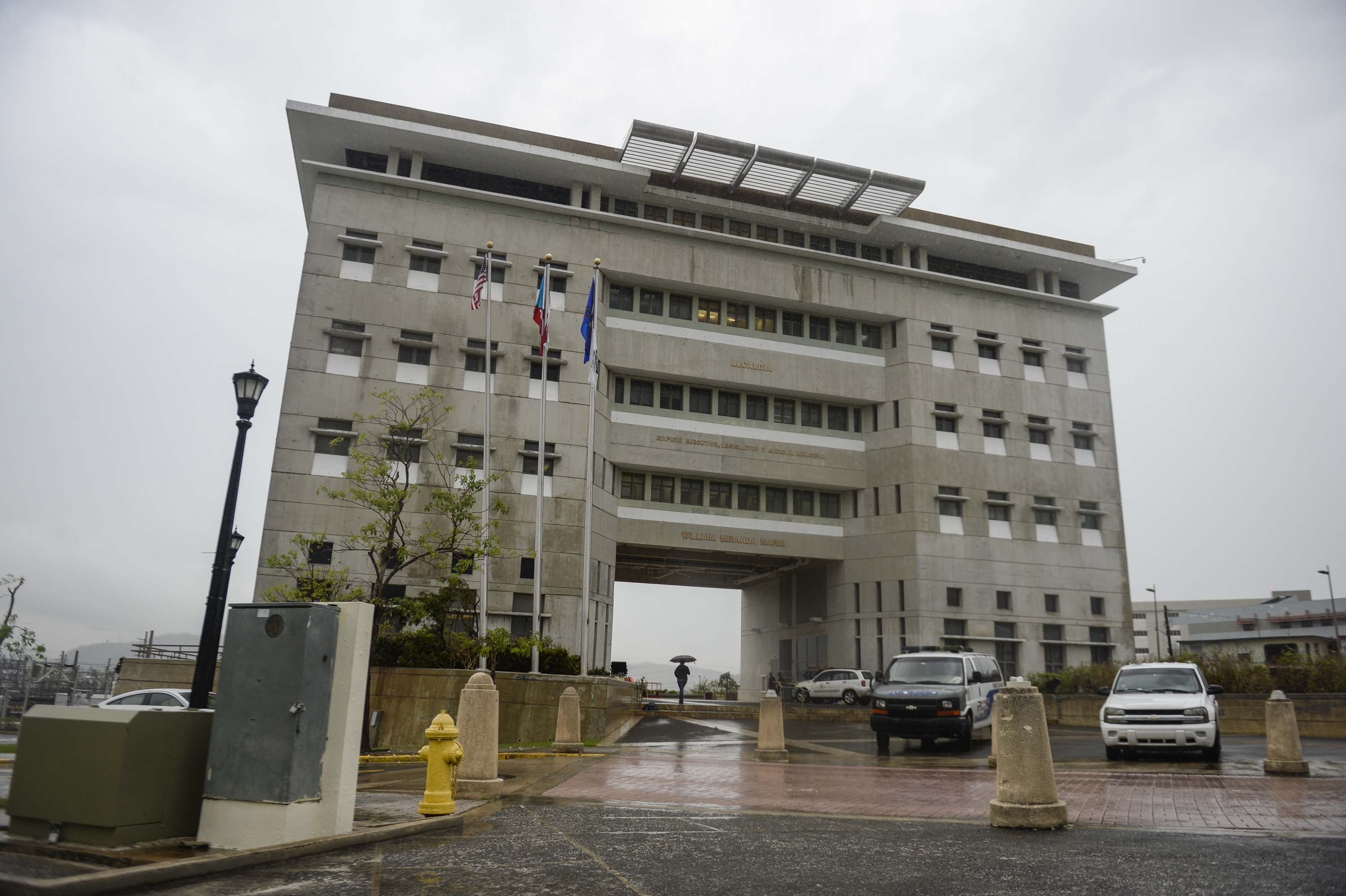
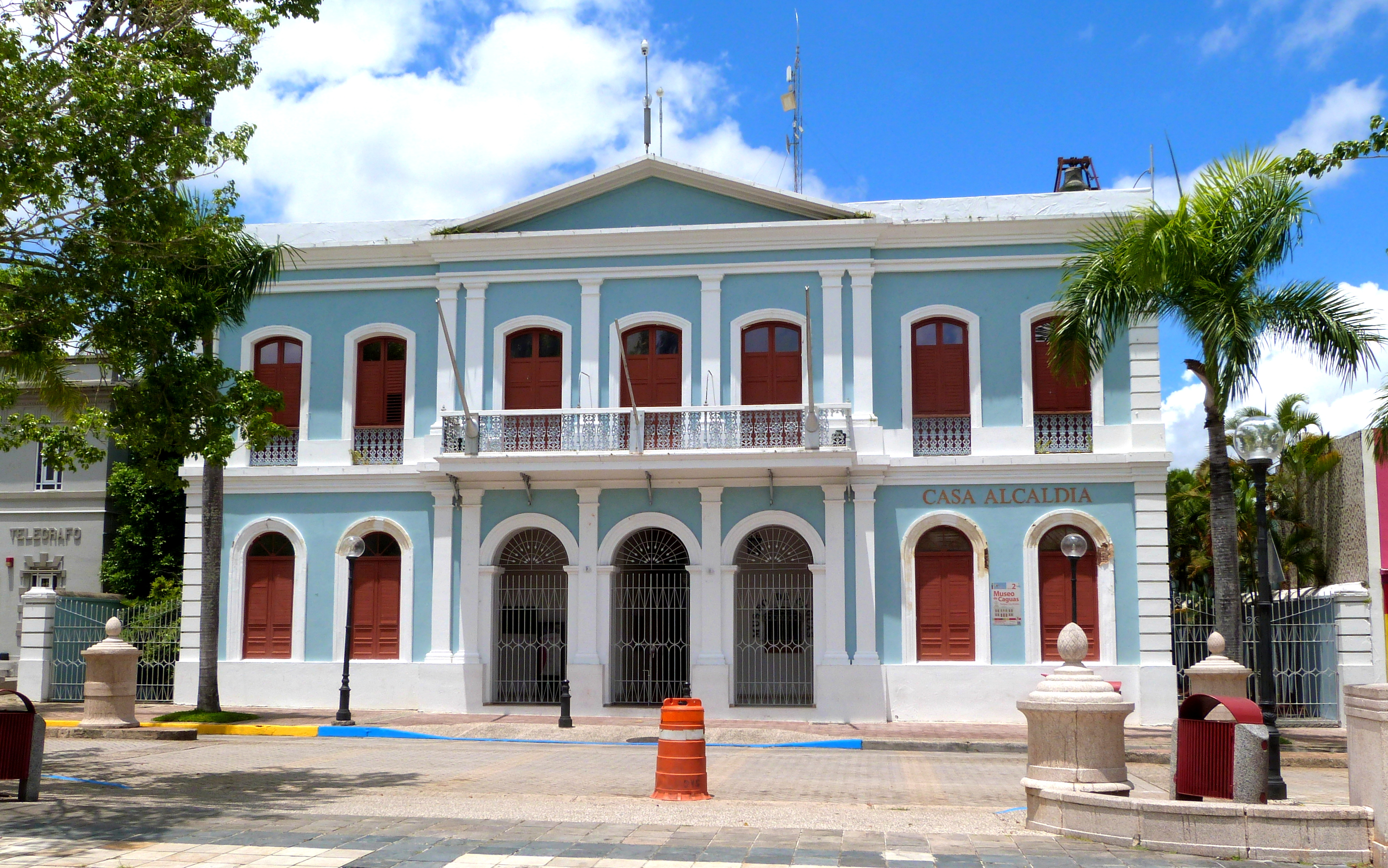
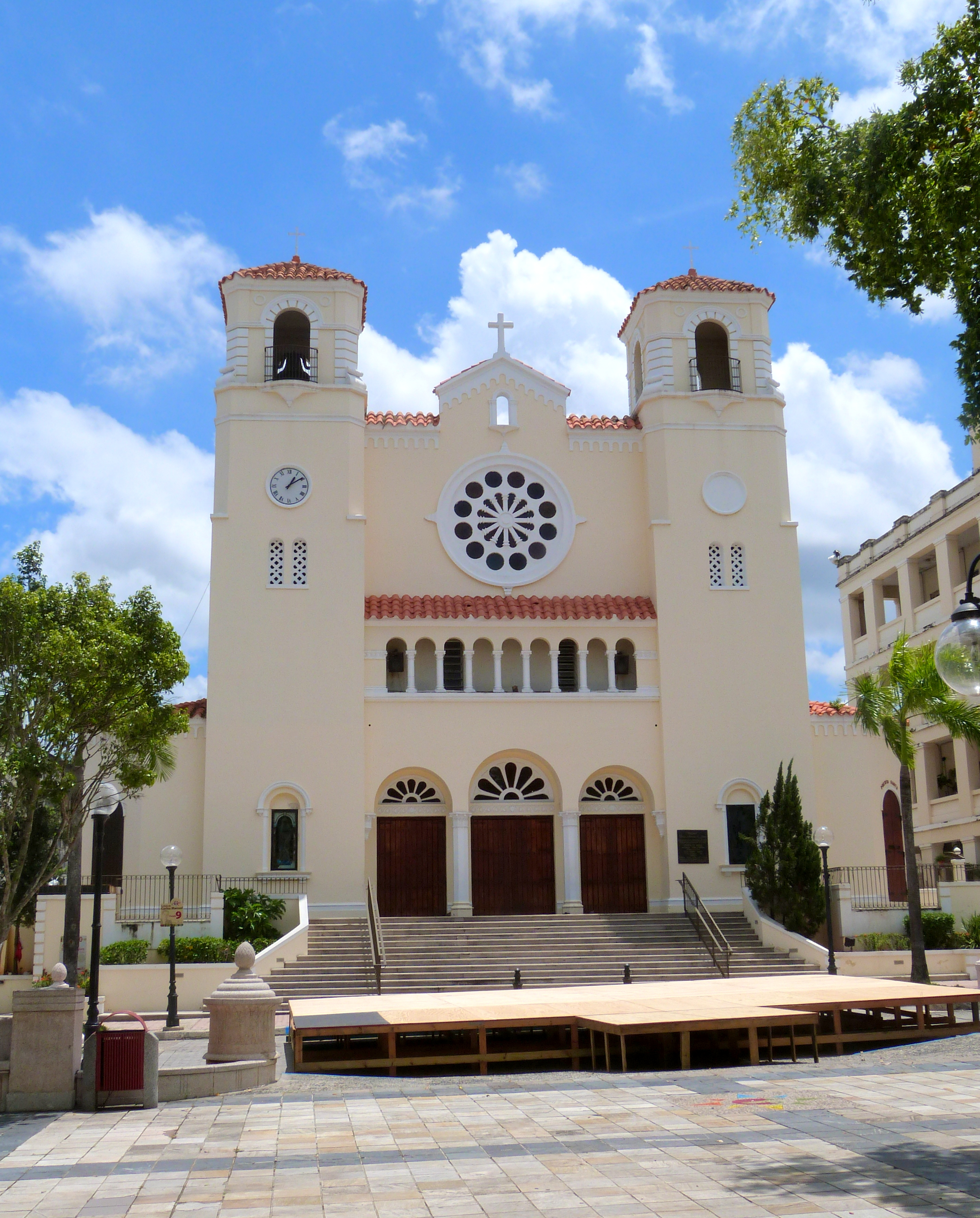
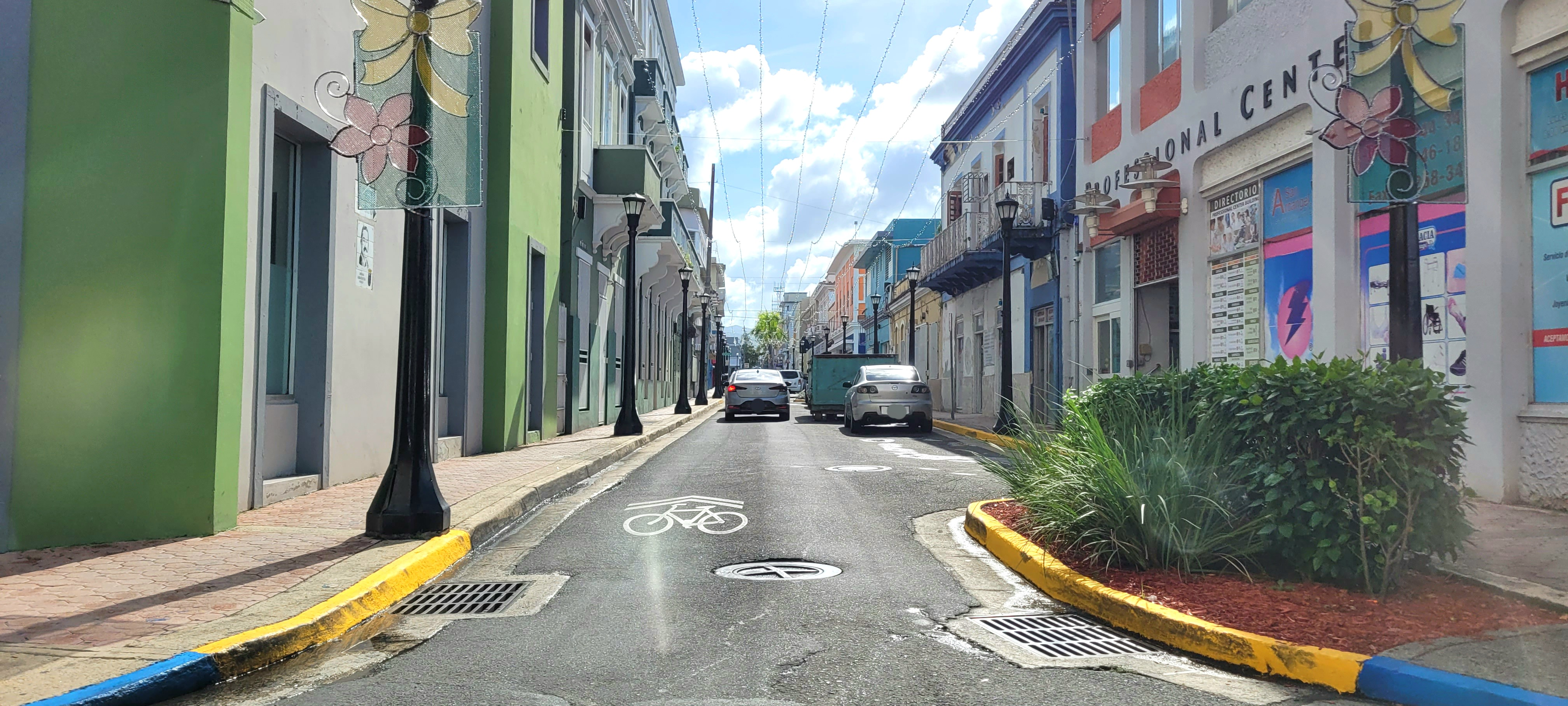
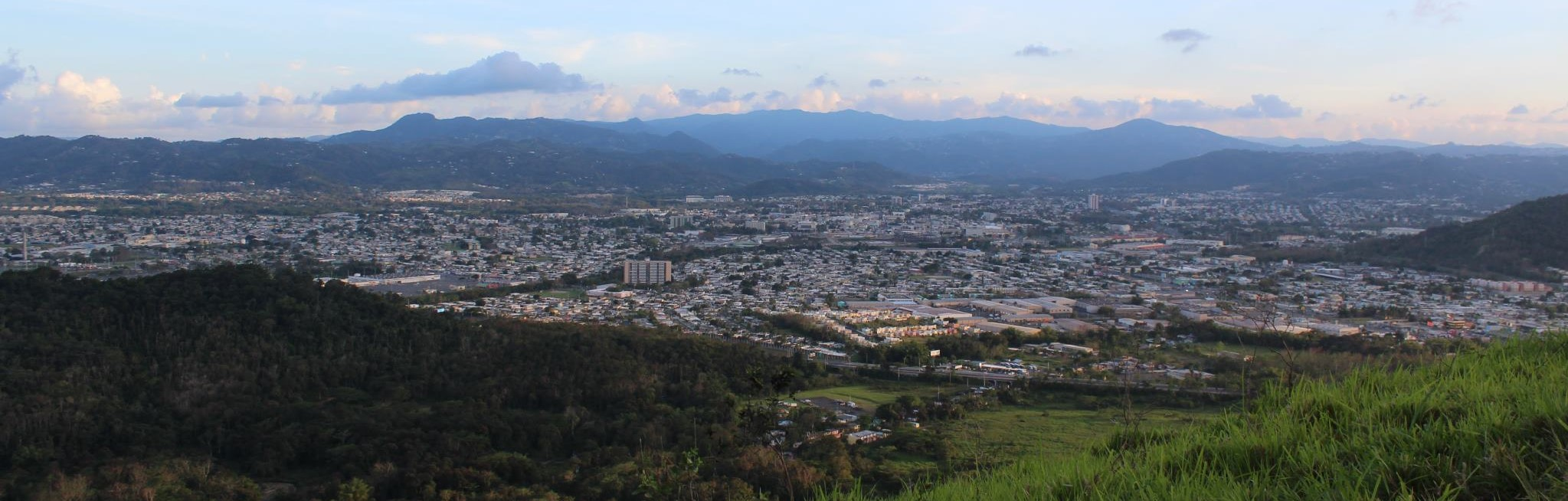
- Caguas City Hall Old City Hall Caguas Cathedral PR-1 in Caguas barrio-pueblo Caguas from Altos de San Luis

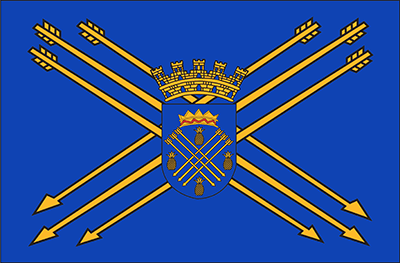
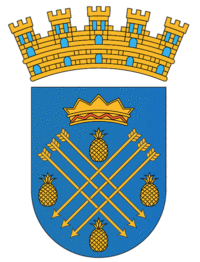
- Flag Coat of arms
- Nicknames: "El Valle del Turabo" (Turabo Valley), "La Ciudad Criolla" (Creole City), "La Cuna de los Trovadores" (Cradle of Trovadores)
- Anthem: "Centro y Corazón de Puerto Rico"
- Interactive map of Caguas
- Coordinates: 18°13′53″N 66°2′22″W
- Sovereign state: United States
- Commonwealth: Puerto Rico
- Indigenous settlement: 100 BCE – 600 CE
- European settlement: mid-16th century
- Founded: January 1, 1775
- Founder: Don Juan Mateo Delgado de Fonseca
- Named for: Caguax
- Barrios: 11 barrios: Caguas barrio-pueblo; Bairoa; Beatriz; Borinquen; Cañabon; Cañaboncito; Río Cañas; San Antonio; San Salvador; Tomás de Castro; Turabo

Government
  - Mayor: William Miranda Torres (PPD)
  - Senatorial dist.: 7 - Humacao
  - Representative dist.: 31,32

Area
  - City and municipality: 59.07 sq mi (153.00 km^{2})
  - Land: 58.68 sq mi (151.97 km^{2})
  - Water: 0.40 sq mi (1.03 km^{2}) 0.006%
  - Urban: 11.00 sq mi (28.49 km^{2})
  - Rural: 48.07 sq mi (124.51 km^{2})

Dimensions
  - Length: 13.68 mi (22.02 km)
  - Width: 7.9 mi (12.7 km)
- Elevation: 211 ft (64.3 m)
- Highest elevation: 2,904 ft (885 m)
- Lowest elevation: 0 ft (0 m)

Population (2020)
  - City and municipality: 127,244
  - Estimate (2025): 124,161 ▼
  - Rank: 5th in Puerto Rico
  - Density: 2,168.6/sq mi (837.30/km^{2})
- Demonym(s): Cagüeño (masculine); Cagüeña (feminine)

Ethnicity (2000 Census)
  - White: 78.2%
  - Black: 7.42%
  - American Indian/AN: 0.1%
  - Asian: 0.3%
  - Native Hawaiians/PI: 14%
- Time zone: UTC−04:00 (AST)
- ZIP Codes: 00725, 00726, 00727
- Area code: 787/939
- Major routes: link = Puerto Rico Highway 1 link = Puerto Rico Highway 30 link = Puerto Rico Highway 32 link = Puerto Rico Highway 33 link = Puerto Rico Highway 34 link = Puerto Rico Highway 156 link = Puerto Rico Highway 172 link = Puerto Rico Highway 183
- Website: caguas.gov.pr

Caguas (Spanish pronunciation: [ˈkaɣwas], locally [ˈkawaʔ]) is a city and municipality in central eastern Puerto Rico. Located in the eponymous Caguas Valley between the Sierra de Cayey and Sierra de Luquillo of the Central Mountain Range, it is bordered by San Juan and Trujillo Alto to the north, Gurabo and San Lorenzo to the west, Aguas Buenas, Cidra and Cayey to the east, and Patillas to the south. With a population of 127,244 as of the 2020 census, Caguas is the fifth most populated municipality in the archipelago and island and a principal city of the San Juan metropolitan area.

Since 2009, Caguas had the distinction of being the only municipality in Puerto Rico recognized as a Tree City USA by the Arbor Day Foundation, until 2026, when the municipality of Vega Baja was announced as the second in the island to receive it.

== Etymology and nicknames ==
Caguas, originally founded as San Sebastián del Piñal de Caguax, is named after the local Taino chieftain Caguax, who at the time of the Spanish arrival in 1493 was cacique of the yucayeque and region of Turabo. The name Caguax itself might be related to the Taino word for snail or slug: 'cagua', similar to other Arawakan and Cariban proper names such as Cagua in Venezuela (from the Cumanagoto word cahigua).

Caguas is nicknamed "Valley of the Turabo" (Valle del Turabo) in reference to the former cacicazgo and yucayeque led by Caguax. The Turabo River is also named after this geopolitical toponym. Other nicknames for Caguas include "the Criollo city" (La Ciudad Criolla) and "the Cradle of Trovadores" (La Cuna de los Trovadores). The city is often known as the "center and heart of Puerto Rico" (Centro y corazón de Puerto Rico) for its geographical location, and one of its municipal anthems bears the same. In recent years the municipality has also been referred to as "the new Caguas country" or "the new land of Caguas" (El nuevo país de Caguas) by the media and the former mayor William Miranda Marín.

== History ==
As with the rest of Puerto Rico, the Taínos were the primary group living in the valley at the time of the Spanish arrival. The Spanish conquistadors further developed the agriculture in the valley, while also establishing mines in search of gold, silver and copper. Most of the native Taínos living in the area were either forced out or taken as slaves and moved to the Real Hacienda del Toa (in modern-day Toa Alta and Toa Baja). Most of the valley was later cleared of its original vegetation for the development of cattle farms such as Hato de Bairoa, Hato de Caguax and Hato de Gurabo.

Caguas was officially founded on January 1, 1775, as San Sebastián del Piñal de Caguax, with the name later being shortened and modernized to its current form. The site of downtown Caguas and its central square dates to 1779. In 1820, the settlement was granted the title of Villa and it was granted city rights in 1894. Sugarcane was the primary crop during this time and important sugarcane plantations and refineries were those of Central Santa Juana (close to modern day Plaza Centro) and Central Santa Catalina (modern day Las Catalinas Mall). The Carretera Central, which is the first paved road to cross Puerto Rico from north to south connecting San Juan to Ponce, was built during the last two decades of the 19th century, made Caguas more accessible therefore causing the population of the town to grow even more.

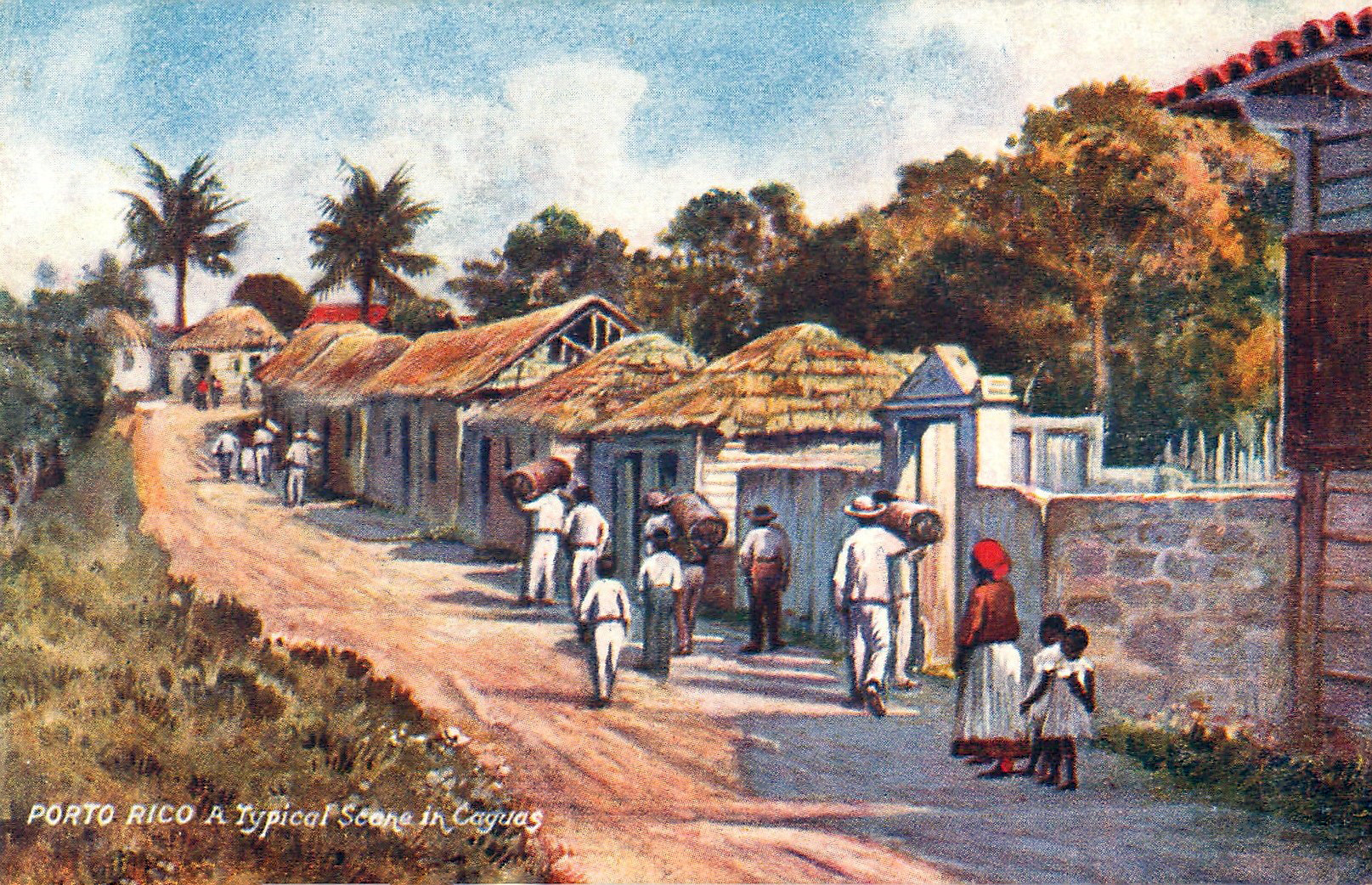
Postcard from 1912 of a street in Caguas at the beginning of the 20th century

Puerto Rico was ceded by Spain in the aftermath of the Spanish–American War under the terms of the Treaty of Paris of 1898 and became a territory of the United States. In 1899, the United States Department of War conducted a census of Puerto Rico finding that the population of Caguas was 19,857.

The city grew considerably in size during the 1970s and quickly became an exurb of San Juan to the north due to its location. The region of Caguas became an important pharmaceuticals manufacturing center during this time. Pharmaceutical companies originally came to Puerto Rico in the late 1960s and 1970s to take advantage of the now-expired federal tax incentive known as Section 936. This incentive allowed U.S.-based manufacturers to send all profits from local plants to stateside parent plants without having to pay any federal taxes.

Although not typically seen as part of the colloquial Área Metro of San Juan (San Juan, Cataño, Bayamón, Guaynabo and Carolina), the municipality of Caguas is located in the census-based San Juan Metropolitan Area due to its role as a commuter town. The average commute time for residents of the municipality is 30.5 minutes. Caguas is the fourth most populous city in the San Juan Metropolitan region and the most populous city in Puerto Rico that is not located in a coastal area.

On August 7, 2002, Caguas was the site of the 2002 USAF Hercules air disaster, where all 10 military personnel on board lost their lives after an airplane carrying them struck a mountain in the south of the municipality.

Hurricane Maria on September 20, 2017, triggered numerous landslides in Caguas with its wind and rain. Rivers were breached causing flooding of low-lying areas, and infrastructure and homes were destroyed. The hurricane caused $90 million in damages in Caguas. More specifically, 40 homes were left without a roof and 30 were flooded in the Morales neighborhood. Escuela Segunda Unidad Diego Vázquez and the Centro Multiusos flooded as well.

== Geography ==
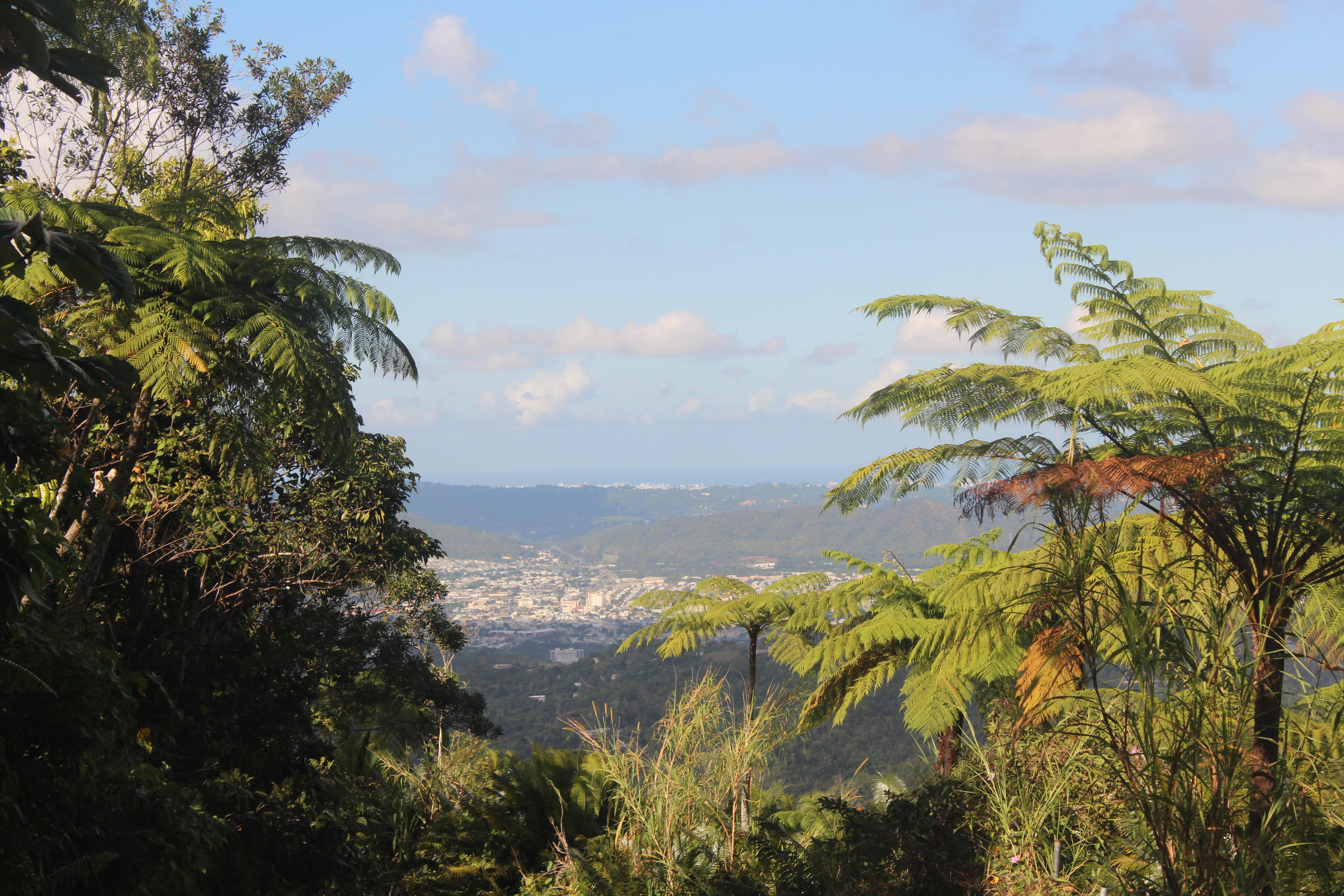
Caguas from the Sierra de Cayey

The city and municipality of Caguas are located approximately 30 minutes from the coastline both on the east (Humacao) and the north (San Juan). It is east of Aguas Buenas and Cidra, north of Cayey, south of San Juan, and west of Gurabo and Trujillo Alto. It also shares borders with Guayama and Patillas via a five-point border at the summit of Cerro La Santa, with Cayey and San Lorenzo. This is the tallest point of the Sierra de Cayey, not to be confused with Montaña Santa (officially called Cerro de Nuestra Madre) which is another mountain in the same massif located on the boundary between the municipalities of Patillas and San Lorenzo. At this point there are two tall antennas which provide signal to Puerto Rico's principal TV stations such as WKAQ-TV and WAPA-TV. No road passes exactly at this point, and it can be approached nearby through Puerto Rico Highway 184.

=== Valle de Caguas ===
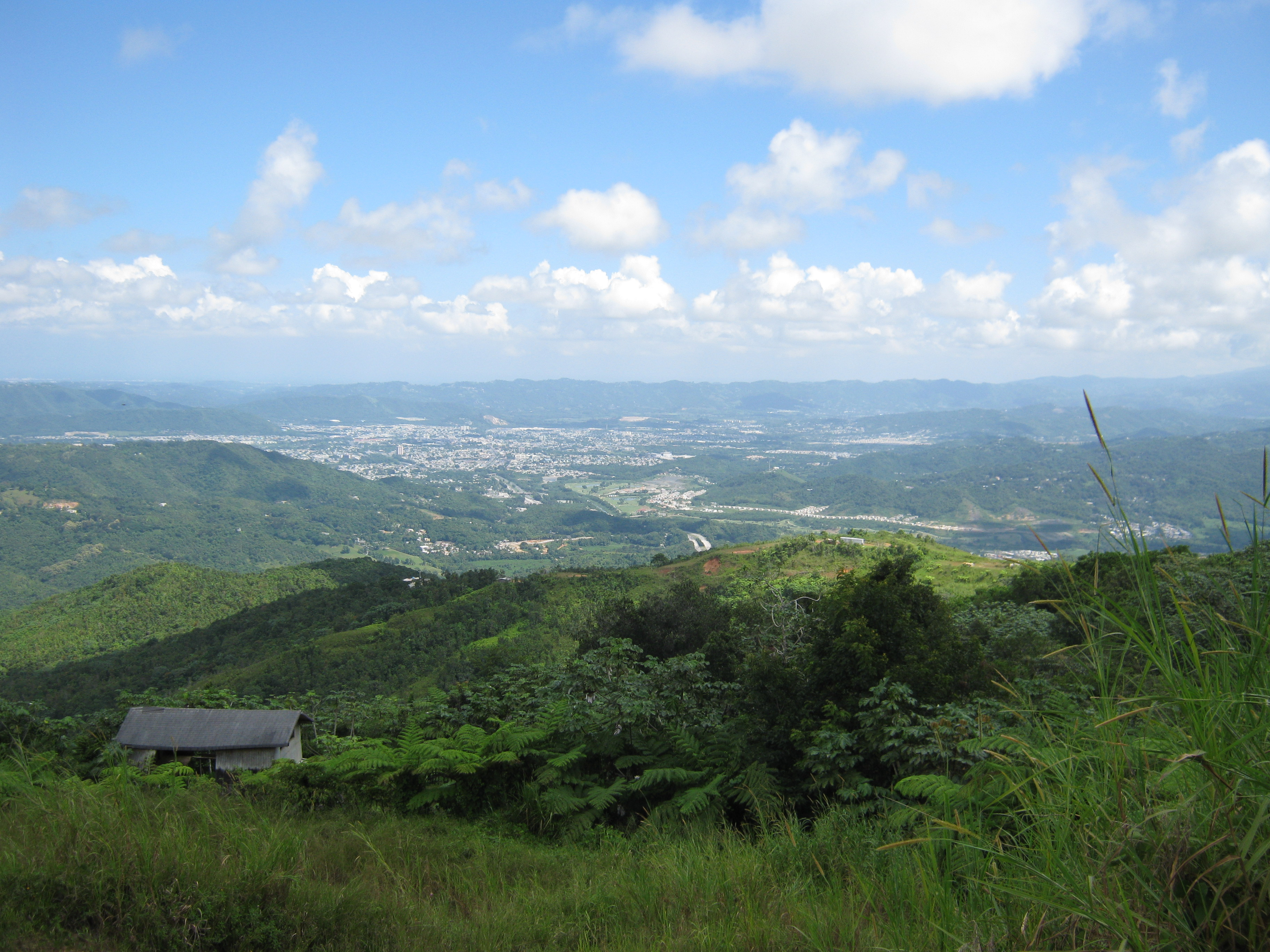
View of the Caguas Valley from Cerro Las Piñas in Beatriz, Cayey.

The city is located in one of the largest valleys in Puerto Rico, the Valle de Caguas or Caguas Valley (also known as Valle del Turabo or the Turabo Valley). Being located in a valley, Caguas has the distinction of being relatively flat except near the borders with all the mentioned municipalities except Gurabo. The valley is bordered by the Altos de La Mesa and San Luis ranges in the north, the Sierra de Luquillo on the northeast, the San Lorenzo batholith to the east, the Sierra de Cayey on the south and the main range of the Cordillera Central to the west.

This valley is fed mainly by the Grande de Loíza River, one of Puerto Rico's major rivers that feed into the Atlantic Ocean, and numerous tributaries such as the Cagüitas, along which the contemporary settlement of Caguas was built. The city's nickname Valle del Turabo comes from the Turabo River, which is another tributary that flows from the south. The Gurabo River, another major tributary, feeds into the Grande de Loíza at a region where the valley narrows into a rift valley that runs from west to east and ends in Humacao in the southeastern coast of the island.

As with other parts of Puerto Rico, the region of Caguas is susceptible to earthquakes. The municipality is located along the Great Northern Puerto Rico fault zone (GNPRfz) and in recent times the region experienced moderate size earthquakes in 1990 and 2010.

=== Water features ===
- The Río Grande de Loíza divides the municipality from Gurabo.
- Other rivers: Río Turabo, Río Cagüitas, Río Cañaboncito, Río Bairoa and Río Cañas.

=== Climate ===
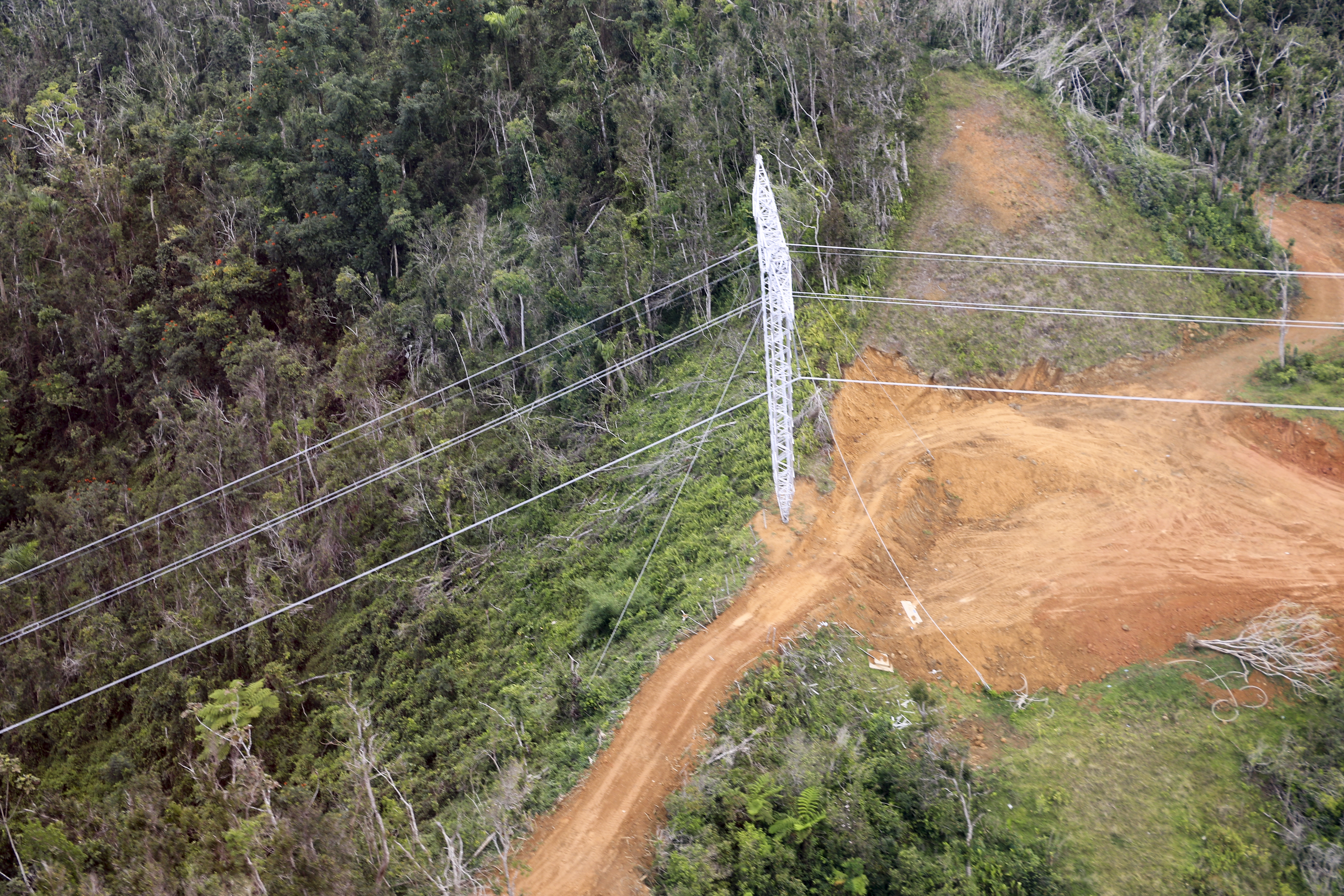
Restoring the electrical grid in Caguas, post Hurricane Maria.

The climate is classified as a tropical monsoon climate, meaning the daily mean temperature from month to month is never less than 64.4 °F (18.0 °C), and there is a distinct wet and dry season. Rainfall is common in relative abundance throughout most of the year, although there is less rain than in the eastern coastal valleys. The land, however, is fertile and deep.

Climate data for Caguas (Average and Records: 1948-2010)
Month	Jan	Feb	Mar	Apr	May	Jun	Jul	Aug	Sep	Oct	Nov	Dec	Year
Record high °F (°C)	92 (33)	93 (34)	95 (35)	95 (35)	97 (36)	99 (37)	99 (37)	98 (37)	101 (38)	99 (37)	95 (35)	95 (35)	101 (38)
Mean daily maximum °F (°C)	79.3 (26.3)	80.9 (27.2)	86.4 (30.2)	88.1 (31.2)	89.4 (31.9)	90.5 (32.5)	90.7 (32.6)	91.1 (32.8)	91.0 (32.8)	90.0 (32.2)	87.4 (30.8)	84.9 (29.4)	87.5 (30.8)
Daily mean °F (°C)	70.9 (21.6)	71.1 (21.7)	74.3 (23.5)	77.1 (25.1)	79.6 (26.4)	81.4 (27.4)	82.7 (28.2)	82.5 (28.1)	82.8 (28.2)	81.6 (27.6)	78.1 (25.6)	75.4 (24.1)	78.1 (25.6)
Mean daily minimum °F (°C)	62.5 (16.9)	61.1 (16.2)	62.3 (16.8)	66.0 (18.9)	69.8 (21.0)	72.4 (22.4)	74.7 (23.7)	74.0 (23.3)	74.7 (23.7)	73.2 (22.9)	68.7 (20.4)	65.8 (18.8)	68.8 (20.4)
Record low °F (°C)	50 (10)	50 (10)	49 (9)	56 (13)	62 (17)	65 (18)	66 (19)	67 (19)	66 (19)	64 (18)	59 (15)	57 (14)	49 (9)
Average rainfall inches (mm)	3.05 (77)	2.68 (68)	1.39 (35)	4.32 (110)	10.46 (266)	4.22 (107)	4.20 (107)	5.03 (128)	9.74 (247)	7.12 (181)	7.87 (200)	3.46 (88)	59.52 (1,512)
Average rainy days (≥ 0.10)	9	7	6	12	18	11	8	10	14	10	18	9	100
Source: Southeast Regional Climate Center

=== Barrios ===
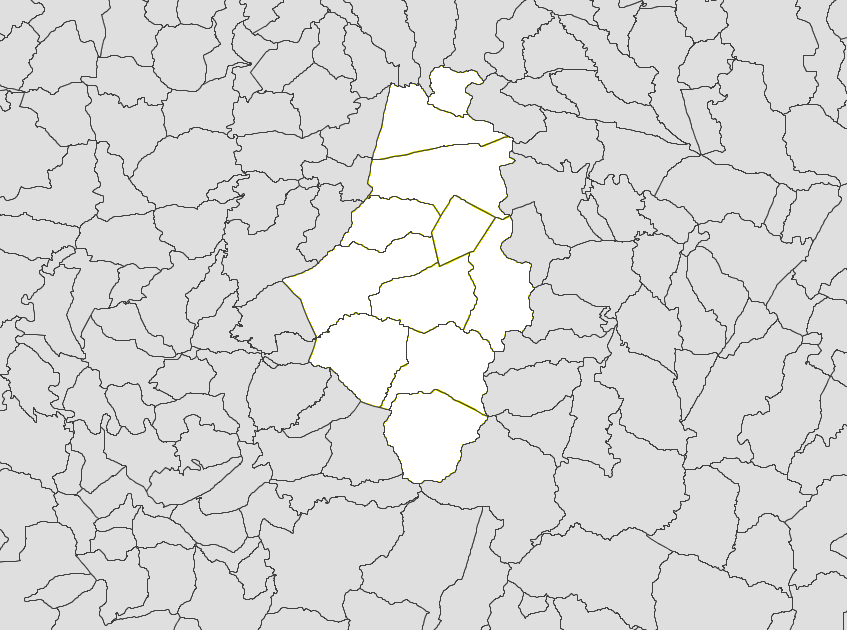
Subdivisions of Caguas.

Like all municipalities of Puerto Rico, Caguas is subdivided into barrios:

1. Caguas barrio-pueblo
2. Bairoa
3. Beatriz
4. Borinquen
5. Cañabón
6. Cañaboncito
7. Río Cañas
8. San Antonio
9. San Salvador
10. Tomás de Castro
11. Turabo

=== Sectors ===
Barrios (which are, in contemporary times, roughly comparable to minor civil divisions) and subbarrios, are further subdivided into smaller areas called sectores (sectors in English). The types of sectores may vary, from normally sector to urbanización to reparto to barriada to residencial, among others.

=== Special Communities ===
Comunidades Especiales de Puerto Rico (Special Communities of Puerto Rico) are marginalized communities whose citizens are experiencing a certain amount of social exclusion. A map shows these communities occur in nearly every municipality of the commonwealth. Of the 742 places that were on the list in 2014, the following barrios, communities, sectors, or neighborhoods were in Caguas: Bairoa La 25, Morales neighborhood, Parcelas Viejas in Borinquén, Sector La Barra, and Comunidad La Quebrada in Río Cañas, Hoyo Frío in Las Carolinas, Lajitas, Las Carolinas, Los Muchos, Los Panes in Beatriz, and Savarona.

== Tourism ==
=== Landmarks and places of interest ===
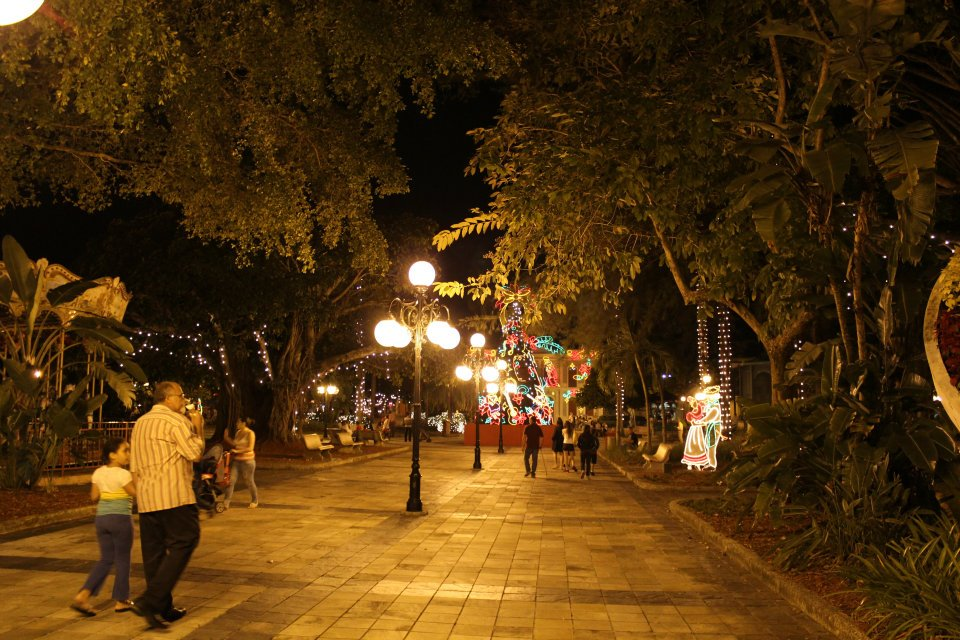
Plaza Palmer, Caguas's main town square, during Christmas.

There are seven places in Caguas listed on the US National Register of Historic Places, including:

- Caguas City Hall (Alcaldia de Caguas, the city hall building)
- Primera Iglesia Bautista de Caguas
- Gautier Benítez High School
- Escuela Vocacional Aguayo Aldea
- Puente No. 6 or (Spanish: Puente La Concepción)
- Carretera Central

Other landscapes, landmarks and tourist attractions in Caguas include:

- Caguas Museum of Art
- Caguas Museum of Folk Arts
- Caguas Museum of History
- Caguas Tobacco Museum
- Dulce Nombre de Jesús Cathedral (Catedral de Caguas), the old city hall and other historical buildings at Plaza Palmer, the main town square.
- Hacienda Catalina Ruins, located in the area of Las Catalinas Mall

=== Parks and natural areas ===
Lotus flower in the Jardín Botánico y Cultural William Miranda Marín

The municipality of Caguas is home to various parks and natural protected areas managed by different governmental entities ranging from the municipal government, the Puerto Rico Department of Natural and Environmental Resources, the Puerto Rico Conservation Trust, and the United States Fish & Wildlife Service.

- Aguas Buenas Cave and Caverns System Nature Reserve, an extensive cave system partially located in the municipality of Caguas.
- Bairoa River Natural Protected Area, protected riparian forest along the Bairoa River.
- Borinquen Valley Natural Area, 25 acres of protected forest located in barrio Borinquen.
- Caguas Real Nature Reserve, 60 acres of riparian forest along the Turabo River managed by the United States Fish & Wildlife Service.
- Caguas Regional Forest, a protected secondary forest and riparian ecosystem along the Turabo River.
- Carite State Forest and Reserve, one of the 20 units in the state forest system of Puerto Rico, partially located in Caguas.
- Cerro Borrás, formerly home to various recreational parks such as Moisty Park, currently preserved as a secondary forest.
- Chalets de Bairoa Natural Area, currently being developed as a preserved ecological corridor within the Valley of Caguas.
- Charco El Cantil, natural swimming pool located along the Turabo River.
- Finca Longo and Altos de San Luis, partially managed by the DRNA forest service and the municipality of Caguas.
- Jardín Botánico y Cultural William Miranda Marín (Botanical and Cultural Gardens), botanical garden and cultural institution containing the ruins of the Hacienda San José plantation and Taíno archaeological sites, located in barrio Cañabón.
- Jorge Sotomayor del Toro Protected Natural Area, a protected natural area located adjacent to the Carite Forest.

=== Voy Turistiendo Campaign ===
To stimulate local tourism during the COVID-19 pandemic in Puerto Rico, the Puerto Rico Tourism Company launched the Voy Turistiendo (I'm Touring) campaign in 2021. The campaign featured a passport book with a page for each municipality. The Voy Turisteando Caguas passport page lists the Jardín Botánico William Miranda Marin, the Catedral Dulce Nombre de Jesús, the Plaza de Recreo Santiago R. Palmer and the Museo de Artes Populares as places of interest.

== Sports ==
- Criollos de Caguas, baseball
- Bairoa Gym, boxing
- Criollas de Caguas, women's volleyball
- Criollos de Caguas FC, soccer

== Economy ==
Local malls include Plaza del Carmen Mall, Plaza Centro Mall, and Las Catalinas Mall.

Urbe Apie is a non-profit founded in 2015 that has claimed and repurposed various abandoned properties in Caguas.

== Demographics ==
Historical population
Census	Pop.	Note	%±
1900	19,857		—
1910	27,160		36.8%
1920	35,920		32.3%
1930	47,728		32.9%
1940	53,356		11.8%
1950	60,132		12.7%
1960	65,098		8.3%
1970	95,661		46.9%
1980	117,959		23.3%
1990	133,447		13.1%
2000	140,502		5.3%
2010	142,893		1.7%
2020	127,244		−11.0%
2025 (est.)	124,161	▼	−2.4%
U.S. Decennial Census; 1899 (shown as 1900) 1910-1930; 1930-1950 1960-2000 2010 2020

In 1899, the United States conducted its first census of Puerto Rico finding that the population of Caguas was 19,857.

In 2020, Caguas had a population of 127,244 compared to 142,893 in 2010. This shows an 11% decrease in the population in the municipality. The population density in 2020 was 2,200 people per square mile (850 people/km^{2}). Hispanic or Latino of any race constitute 98.4% of the population of the municipality. There are also communities of Dominicans, Cubans and Colombians.

== Government ==
All municipalities in Puerto Rico are administered by a mayor, elected every four years. The mayor of the city of Caguas were

1953 to 1969 - Angel Rivera PPD

1969 to 1973 - Miguel Hernandez Rodriguez (New Progressive Party (PNP))

1973 to 1977 - Angel O. Berrios Diaz (PPD)

1977 to 1981 - Miguel Hernandez Rodriguez (PNP)

1981 to 1997 - Angel O. Berrios Diaz (PPD)

1997 to 2010 - William Miranda Marín (PPD)

2010 to present - William Miranda Torres (PPD)

The city belongs to the Puerto Rico Senatorial district VII, which is represented by two Senators. In 2024, Wanda Soto Tolentino and Luis Daniel Colón La Santa were elected as District Senators.

== Symbols ==
The municipio or municipality has an official flag and coat of arms.

=== Flag and coat of arms ===
The colors blue and gold were chosen for the shield, distinctive of the city of Caguas. The figures symbolize both the indigenous and Christian origins of the city.

The coat of arms consists of a shield with a blue field. Upon the field are two sets of three golden arrows, forming a cross of St. Andrew. Above the cross is a crown which represents Caguax, cacique of the Turabo Valley region at the time of the arrival of the Spanish conquerors. Arrows were used as a remembrance of the first Christian place of worship established in the region which was dedicated under the patronage of St. Sebastian. There are pineapples interspersed to reflect the native agriculture. A castellated wall surmounts the shield to show the city's having been granted status as a municipality by the Spanish Crown.

On the flag, the shield sits atop another blue field on which the cross of arrows motif is repeated.

== Transportation ==
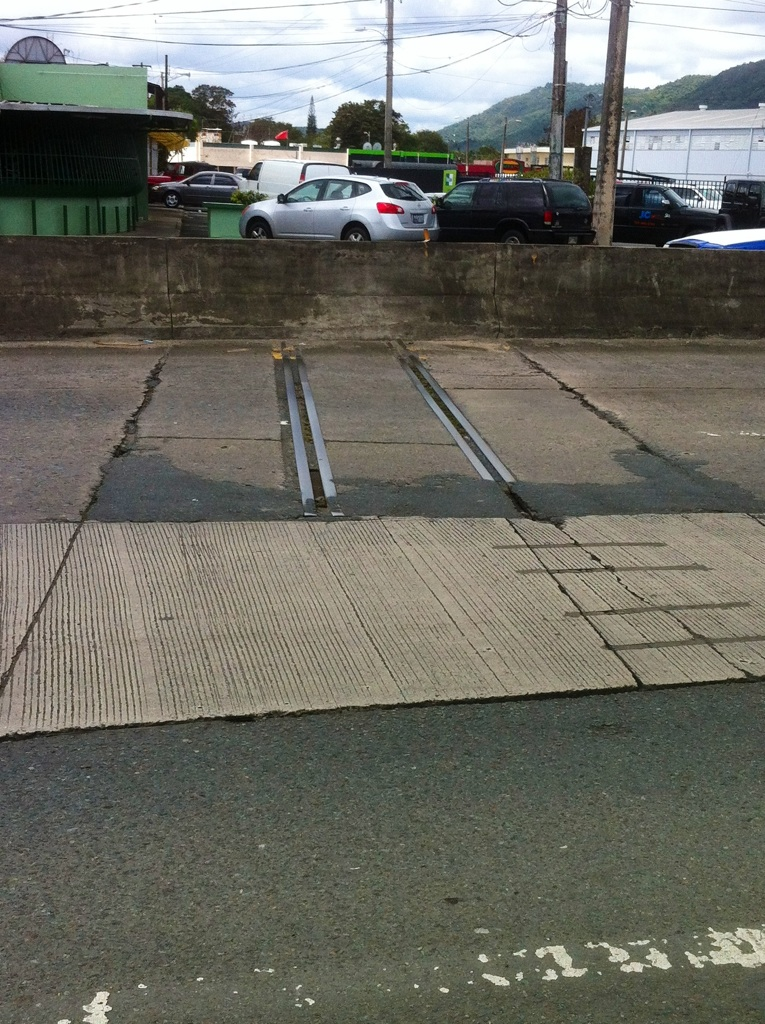
Defunct double gauge rail line of the former railway in Caguas.

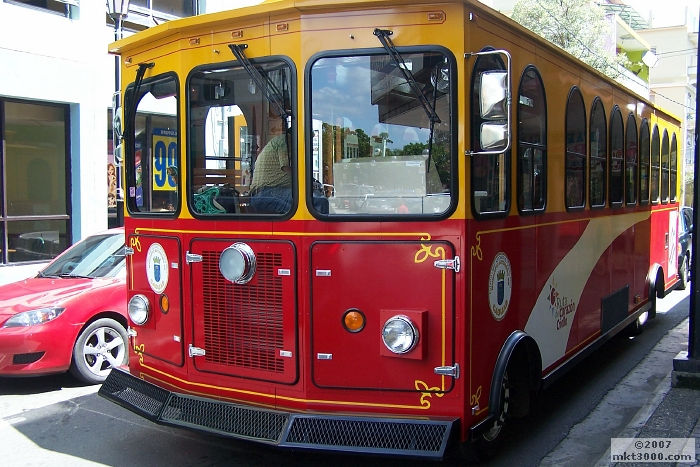
Caguas Municipal Trolley in the Town Square

Public transportation in Caguas, as in most of Puerto Rico, is limited to small "guaguas públicas" (Mini Bus). There is inexpensive but slow service to and from San Juan and Rio Piedras. Several buses and public taxi services serve the town to a limited degree. In 2019, 91.55% of the population relied on their own cars or carpool services to commute.

A "light interurban rail" system connecting Caguas to San Juan was in the planning stages and discarded due to lack of funding.

Caguas is served by one freeway, one tolled expressway and one main divided highway. Puerto Rico Highway 30 connects Caguas to the eastern part of the island. There is no freeway/expressway to the west, due mainly to the fact that there is no sufficient population west of Caguas to develop a new freeway or expressway; good access to the municipalities of Cidra (southwest) and Aguas Buenas (northwest) are possible via PR-172 and PR-156, respectively. Puerto Rico Highway 52 connects Caguas to the north (San Juan) and south (Cayey, Ponce). Puerto Rico Highway 1 is an alternate route to San Juan and Guaynabo with two lanes per direction; in south Caguas it becomes rural near Borinquen, therefore the only good access to Cayey is the expressway (PR-52) and a $1.00 toll has to be paid (only in the south direction). The only municipality bordering Caguas with a poor-access road is San Lorenzo, via PR-183; but good access to San Lorenzo is possible by entering Gurabo via PR-30, and then taking PR-203 south. Luis Muñoz Marín International Airport is about 35 minutes away by car.

There are 86 bridges in Caguas.

== Higher education ==
- San Juan Bautista School of Medicine
- NUC University
- Universidad Interamericana - Recinto de Caguas

== International relations ==
=== Twin towns – sister cities ===
- Belén, Costa Rica
- Santa Fe, Spain

Caguas is also twinned domestically with Hartford, Connecticut and Southbridge, Massachusetts.

== Notable residents ==
- Margot Arce de Vázquez, writer, co-founder of the Puerto Rican Academy of the Spanish Language
- Herman Badillo, lawyer and politician, U.S. House of Representatives from New York, 1971–1977
- Tony Bernazard, MLB baseball player and New York Mets executive
- Myraida Chaves, actress, popular game show host, and television and theater producer
- Ivonne Class, theater producer and sportscaster, director of the Centro de Bellas Artes de Caguas, 2021–present
- Ruth Noemí Colón, 66th Secretary of State of New York, 2010–2011
- Alex Cora, MLB baseball player and manager of the Boston Red Sox
- Joey Cora, MLB baseball player and coach for the Detroit Tigers
- Carlos Cotto, professional wrestler and boxer, also known as El Chicano and El Ilegal
- Henry Cotto, MLB and NPB baseball player and manager of the Arizona Complex League Giants
- Miguel Cotto, professional boxer and first Puerto Rican quadruple champion
- José Luis Dalmau, attorney and politician, 17th President of the Puerto Rico Senate, 2021–present
- Juan Dalmau, attorney and politician
- Abelardo Díaz Alfaro, academic and short story writer, author of Campo Alegre and Terrazo
- Lydia Echevarría, actress and convicted for plotting the murder of her husband
- Edwin Encarnación, MLB baseball player, three-time All-Star and coach for the Toronto Blue Jays
- Ramón Franco, film and television actor known for his roles in Tour of Duty (1987–1990) and Heartbreak Ridge (1986)
- Roque Gallart, television personality also known as Rocky the Kid
- José García Cosme, convicted criminal also known as Papo Cachete
- José Gautier Benítez, poet and writer of the Romantic era
- Guaynaa, rapper and singer
- Gilda Haddock, film and telenovela actress, dancer and gospel singer
- Jorge Haddock Acevedo, engineer and academic administrator, President of the University of Puerto Rico, 2018–2021
- Amri Hernández-Pellerano, electronics engineer and scientist
- Vilma G. Holland, painter
- Jose "Cha Cha" Jimenez, political activist and founder of the Young Lords Organization
- Francisco Lindor, MLB baseball player for the New York Mets
- Carlos Lozada, Vietnam War veteran and United States Army Medal of Honor recipient
- Johnny Lozada, actor, singer and television host, former member of Menudo
- Concha Meléndez, educator and writer, first woman to belong to the Puerto Rican Academy of Languages
- Wilnelia Merced, former actress and model, crowned Miss World 1975
- Florencio Morales Ramos, composer and musician (trovador) popularly known as El Cantor de la Montaña known for his song Que Bonita Bandera
- Janice Olivencia, professional golfer and first Puerto Rican woman to play in the U.S. Women's Open
- Danny Ortiz, MLB and LMB baseball player
- José Ignacio Quintón, pianist and composer of danzas such as El Coquí
- Francisco José Ramos, academic, philosopher and poet, author of the philosophical trilogy Aesthetics of Thought
- Edwin Ríos, MLB baseball player for the Cincinnati Reds
- Yacksel Ríos, MLB baseball player for the Oakland Athletics
- Carlos Manuel Rodríguez Santiago, first Puerto Rican and the first Caribbean-born layperson to be beatified
- Felipe Rodríguez, popular bolero singer popularly known as La Voz
- Jesús Rojas, professional boxer and WBA (Regular) featherweight champion
- Mercedes Solá, educator, writer, suffragist and women's rights activist
- Xcelencia, songwriter and musician
- Pilar Marie Victoriá, college volleyball player for the Texas Longhorns and the Arkansas Razorbacks
- Jessica Wild, drag queen and make-up artist, contestant on the second season of RuPaul's Drag Race and the eighth season of RuPaul's Drag Race All Stars
- Dean Zayas, academic, actor, director, playwright and writer, tenured at the University of Puerto Rico, Río Piedras Campus for more than 50 years

== Gallery ==
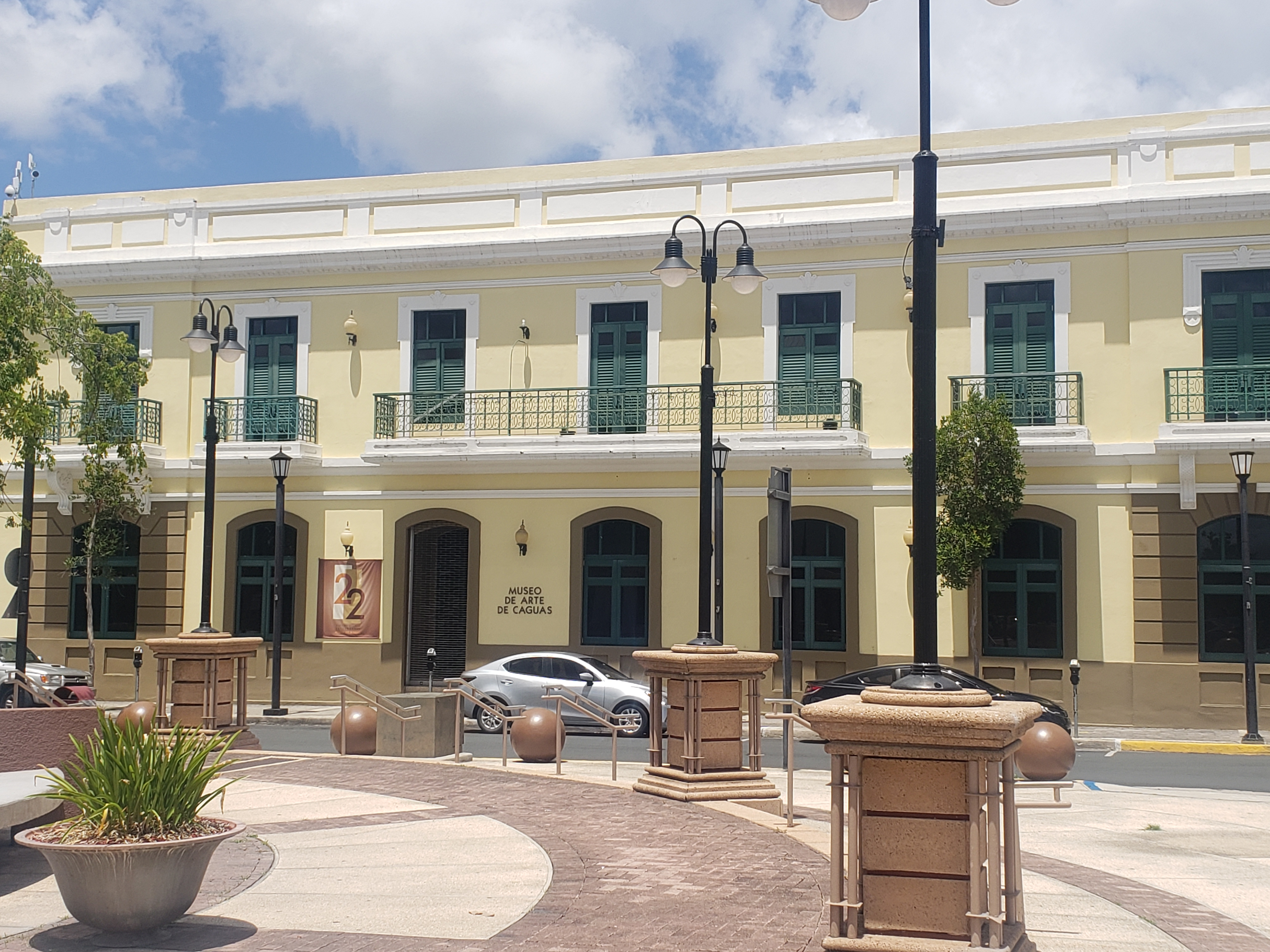
Caguas Museum of Art

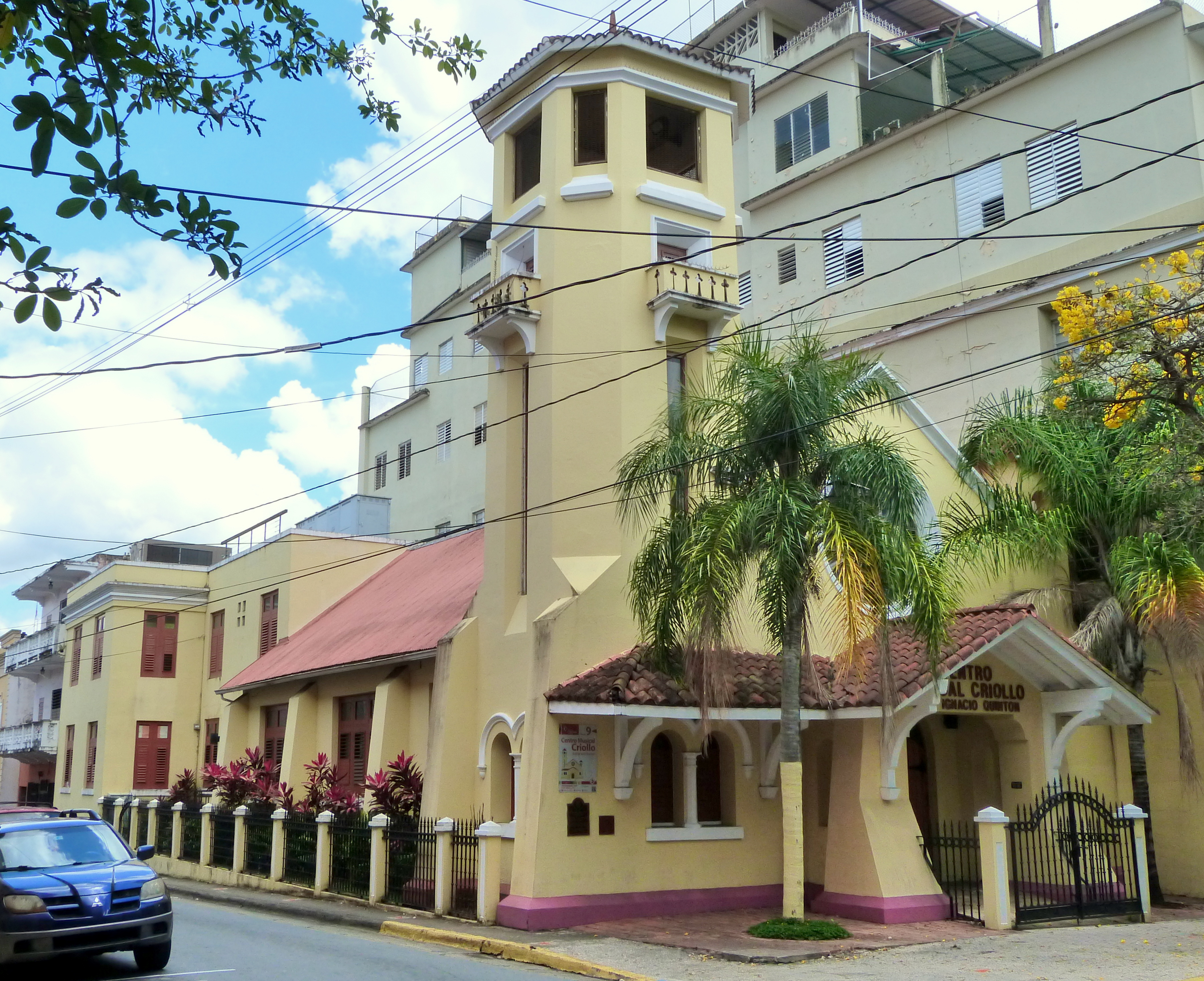
José Ignacio Quintón Center for Criollo Music, former First Baptist Church of Caguas

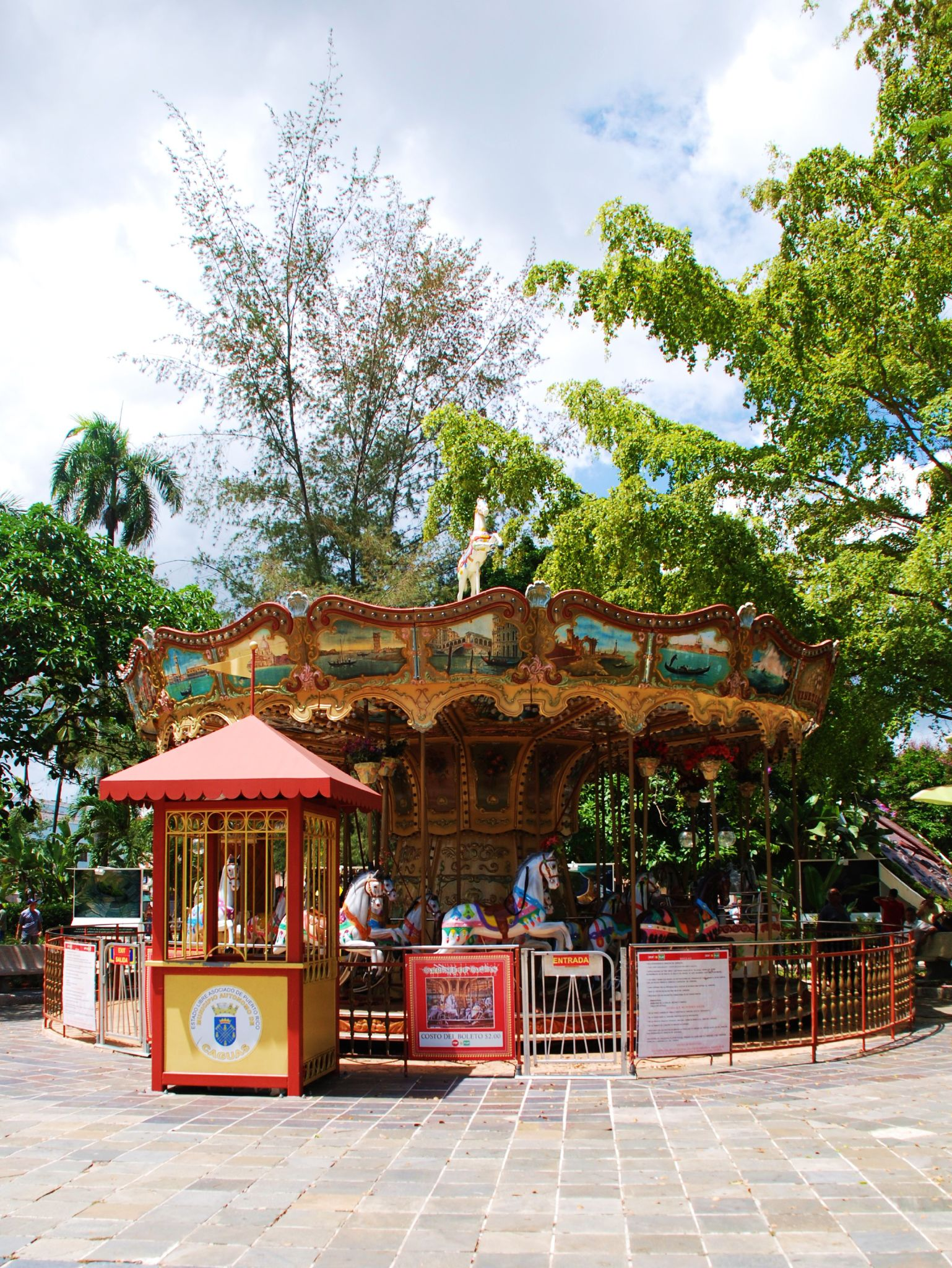
Carousel in Plaza de Caguas

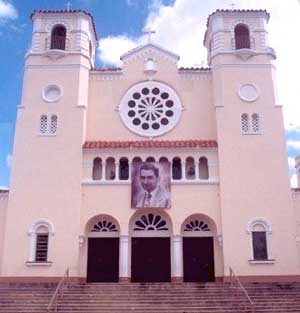
Caguas Cathedral

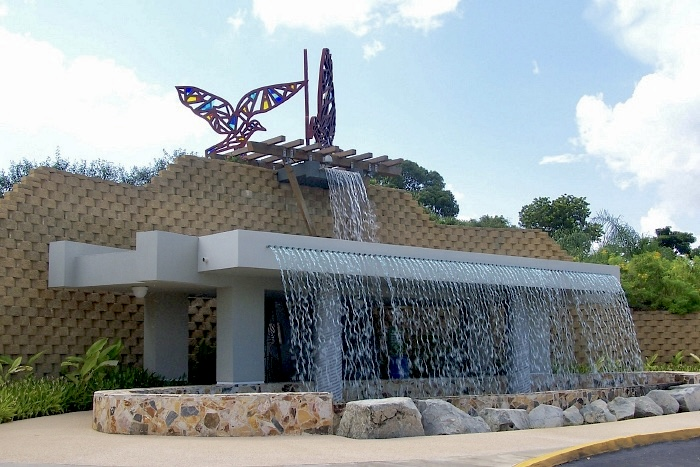
Entrance to the Botanical and Cultural Gardens

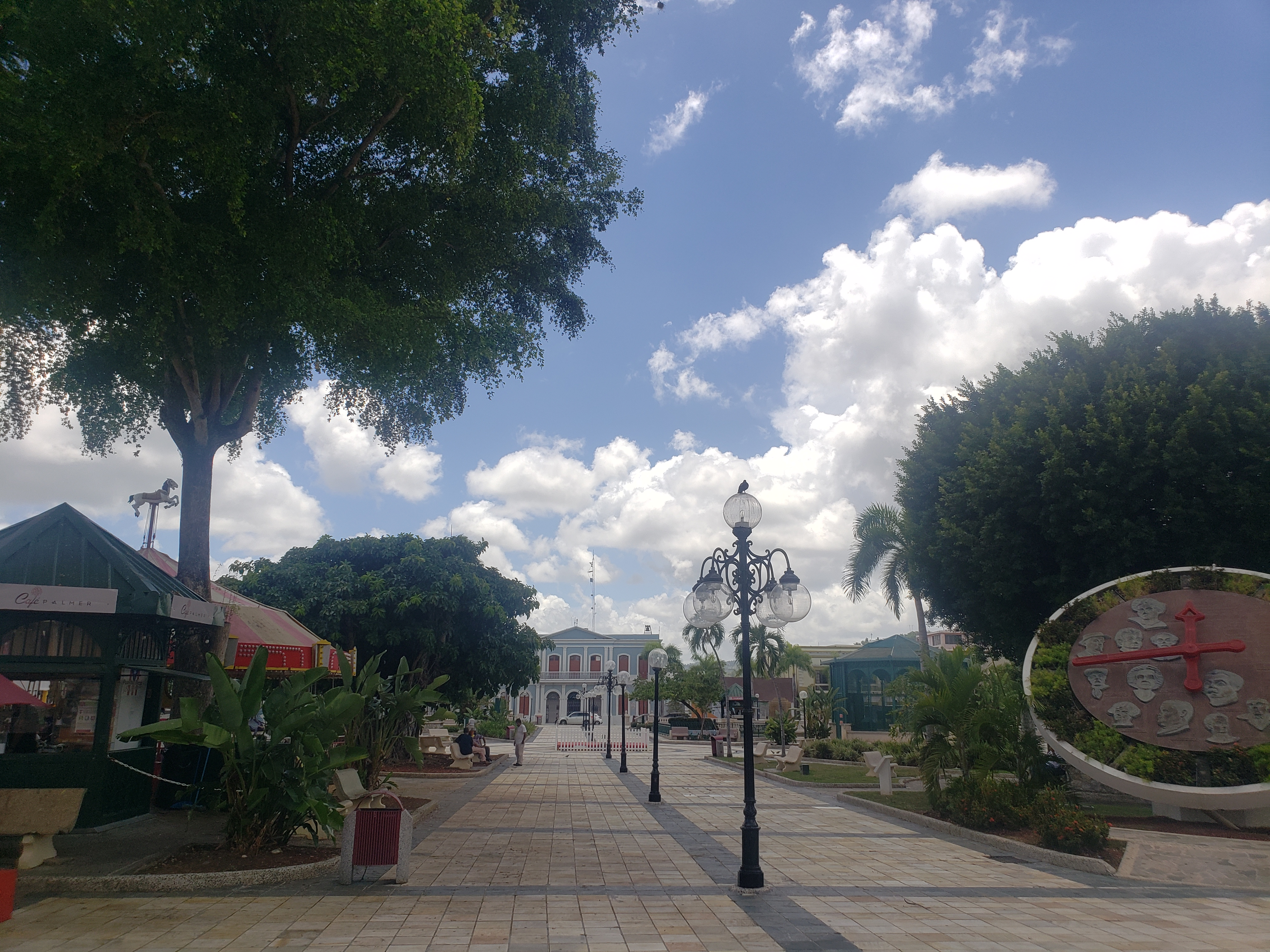
Main square for recreation, Plaza de Recreo Santiago R. Palmer in Caguas barrio-pueblo

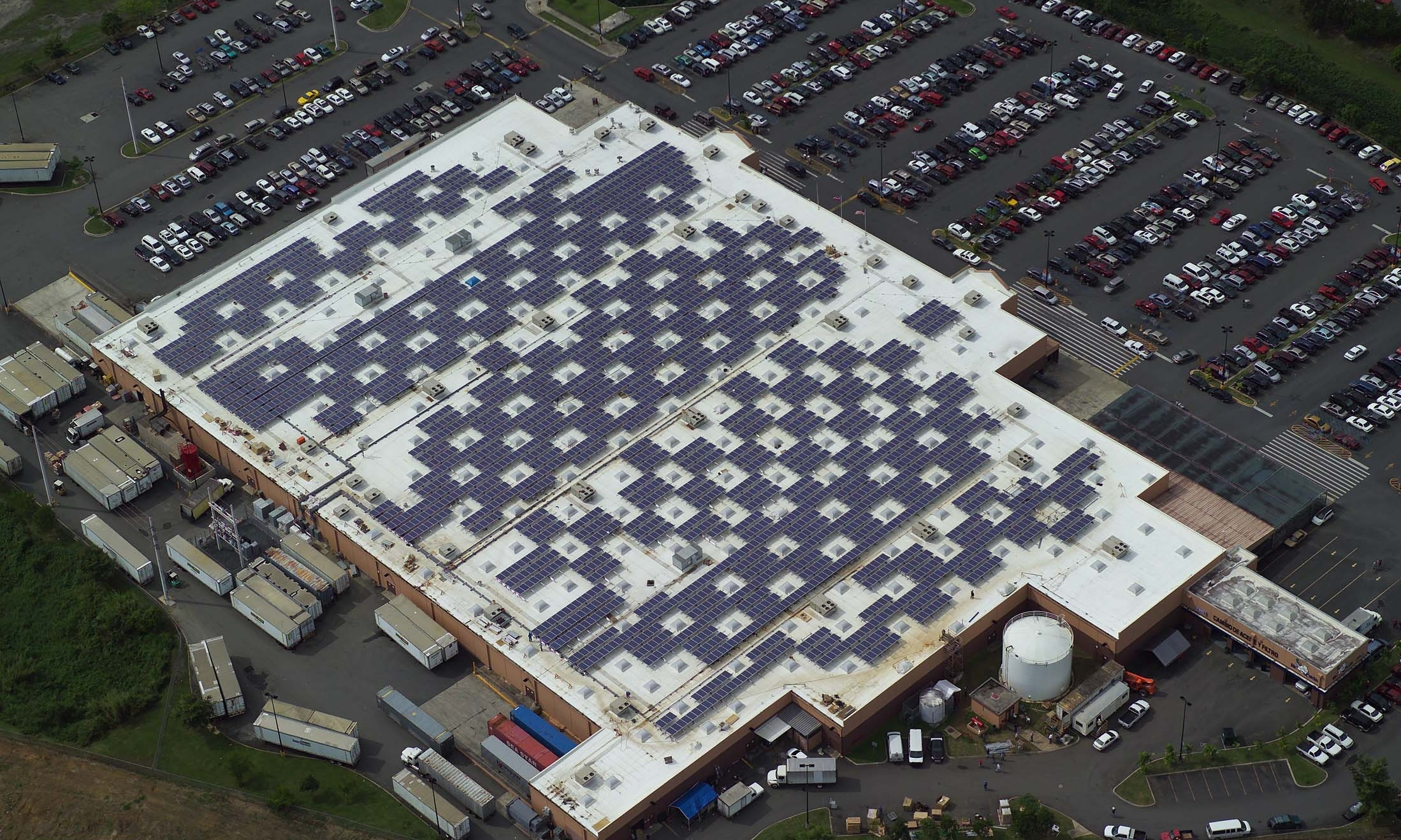
The Walmart in Caguas, Puerto Rico is one of five Walmart facilities on the island equipped with solar panels.

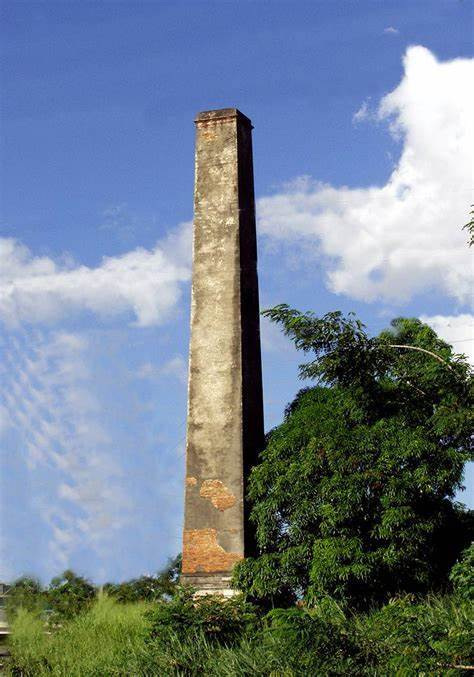
Chimney at former sugar producing Hacienda Santa Catalina

== See also ==
- List of Puerto Ricans
- History of Puerto Rico
- Roman Catholic Diocese of Caguas
