= Underrated =

Underrated may refer to:

- Underrated, a 2019 album by Papoose
- Underrated, a 2014 mixtape by Xcelencia
- Underrated, an unreleased album by Bow Wow
- Chapter V: Underrated, a 2011 album by Syleena Johnson
- Underrated, a member of hip hop group Potluck
- Stephen Curry: Underrated, a 2023 American sports documentary film

== See also ==
- Under Rated & Never Faded, comedy special by Mike Epps
