= Abelardo Díaz Alfaro =

Puerto Rican writer (1916–1999)

Abelardo Milton Díaz Alfaro
- Born: July 24, 1916; Caguas, Puerto Rico
- Died: July 22, 1999 (aged 82); San Juan, Puerto Rico
- Occupation: Author
- Spouse: Gladys Meaux
- Children: His children's name are Abelardo, Dalila and Nanette
- Relatives: His father Don Abelardo Diaz Morales was a baptist minister. His mother, Asunción Alfaro Prats was a teacher. His sister, Abigail Díaz Alfaro, was the second of wife of Gilberto Concepción De Gracia, founder of the Puerto Rican Independence Party
- Writing career
- Period: 1940s
- Genres: Comedy, Romance
- Notable works: Campo Alegre, "Terrazo"

Abelardo Díaz Alfaro (July 24, 1916 – July 22, 1999) was an author from Puerto Rico who achieved great fame throughout Latin America during the 1940s. His book Campo Alegre is a text that has been studied at schools in Austria, Australia, Canada, England, New Zealand as well as all over the Americas.

== Life and career ==
Díaz Alfaro was born in Caguas, Puerto Rico, but soon after his family moved to Ponce. He was the son of Abelardo Díaz Morales, a Baptist minister, and Asunción Alfaro Pratts (Doña Sunchita). His siblings were Abigail, Dalila, Miriam, Priscilla, Raquel, Lydia and Samuel. He returned to Caguas to attend university and married Gladys Meaux, with whom he had two daughters (Dalila and Nanette) and one son (Abelardo).

Díaz Alfaro obtained a bachelor's of Arts Instituto Politécnico de San Germán, which is now known as Universidad Interamericana de Puerto Rico and a master's degree in social work at the University of Puerto Rico He also obtained a title as a social worker, and certificates in Spanish and Psychology.

He obtained many honorary doctorates from different universities.

Some of his short stories, like "Peyo Mercé enseña inglés" or "Santa Cló va a la Cuchilla" (in Terrazo) create a Manichaean dichotomy between unlearned Puerto Rican peasants and American invaders (portrayed through the mandatory teaching of the English language in Puerto Rico). Thus, a praise of layman culture is expressed throughout his short stories. The metaphor of weak or feminine Americans versus uneducated but brave Puerto Ricans is taken later by other writers like Ana Lydia Vega.

He presented at conferences in many parts of Latin America after reaching fame, including in Mexico (at the Ateneo Español), Venezuela and many other countries. His books have been translated into English, Polish, Russian, German, French, Italian and Czech, among other languages.

== Works ==
Among the books he wrote are:

- Terrazo (published in 1947)
- Mi Isla Soñada
- Los Perros
- The Eye of the Heart
- United States in Literature
- Classic Tales of Spanish America
- Cuentos del Mundo Hispano (Spanish version of Classic Tales)
- Changes Antología Mundial
- The Green Antilles
- Contemporary Readers
- National Catholic
- The Princeton Tiger
- Europe in France
- Campo Alegre.
- Santa Clo va a la cuchilla (cuento)

== Gallery ==
Mural towards Caguas along PR-1, 2016

== See also ==
- List of Puerto Rican writers
- List of Puerto Ricans
- Puerto Rican literature
