= Primera Iglesia Bautista de Caguas =

Museum and historic church building in Caguas, Puerto Rico

- U.S. National Register of Historic Places
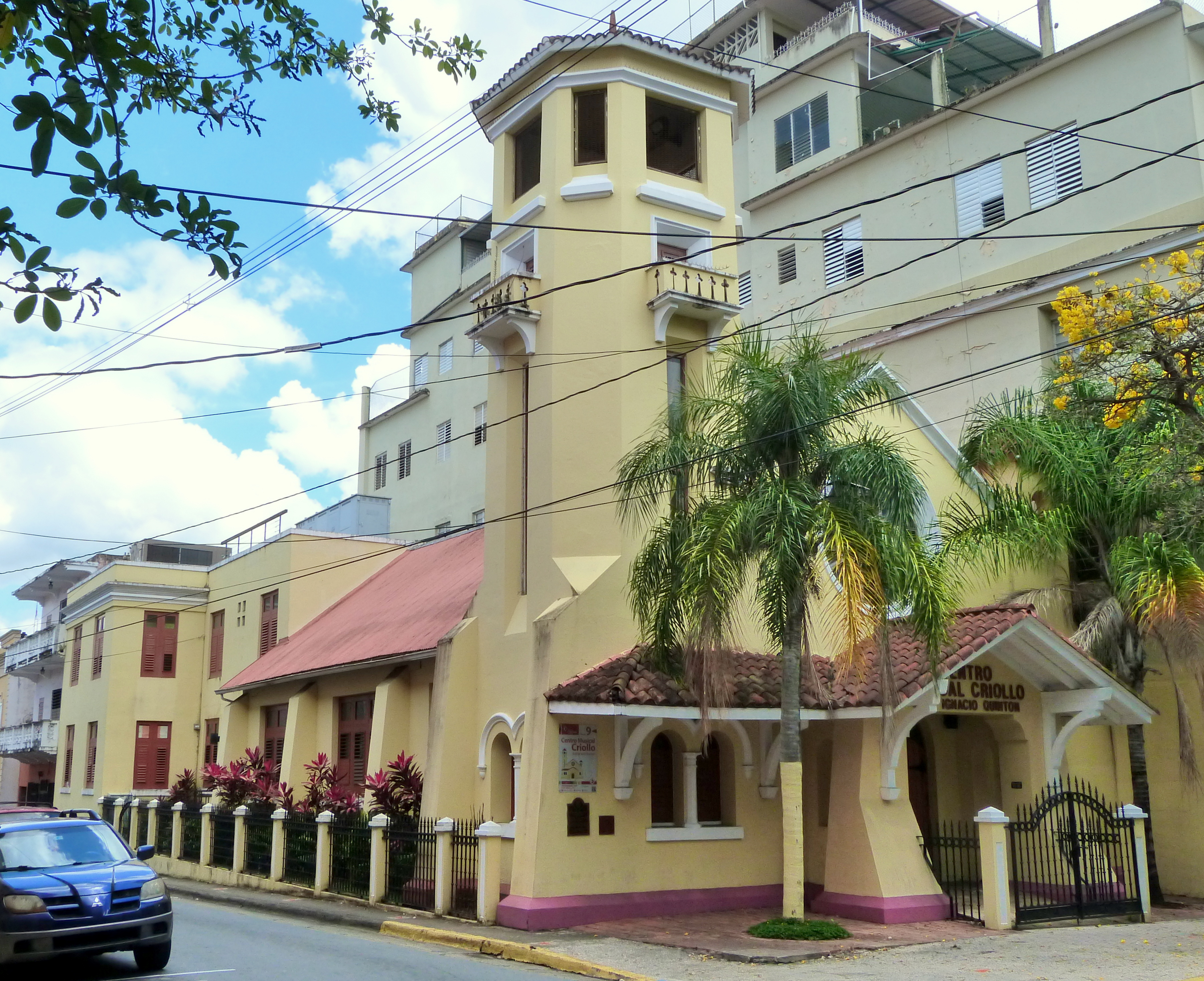
- The church building in 2017, as the José Ignacio Quintón Center for Criollo Music

- Location within Puerto Rico
- Location: Corner of Ruiz Belvis and Intendenta Ramírez St., Caguas, Puerto Rico
- Coordinates: 18°14′05″N 66°02′01″W
- Built: 1909
- Architectural style: Romanesque
- Restored: 1996
- NRHP reference No.: 08000949
- Added to NRHP: September 24, 2008

Primera Iglesia Bautista de Caguas, or Caguas’ First Baptist Church, was built in 1909. It was listed on the National Register of Historic Places in 2008.

The church was founded in 1900.

The church is notable as a "beautiful example of Romanesque Revival architecture."

== See also ==
- National Register of Historic Places listings in Caguas, Puerto Rico
