= Francisco José Ramos =

Puerto Rican philosopher and poet

- Born: December 31, 1950 (age 75); Caguas, Puerto Rico

Education
- Education: MA from Complutense University of Madrid in 1976; PhD from Complutense University of Madrid in 1982

Philosophical work
- Era: Contemporary Philosophy
- Region: Western Philosophy
- Institutions: University of Puerto Rico
- Main interests: Ontology; Buddhism; Psychoanalysis
- Notable ideas: Scenography; Movement of Thought

Francisco José Ramos is a Puerto Rican philosopher, poet, and retired university professor. He is the author of the philosophical trilogy Aesthetics of Thought. He is also a numerary member of the Puerto Rican Spanish Academy.

== Biography ==
Ramos was born on December 31, 1950, in Caguas, Puerto Rico. He completed a master's degree (1976) and Ph.D (1982) in Philosophy at the Complutense University of Madrid. His studies focused on the philosophy of Friedrich Nietzsche, with a master's thesis titled Thought and Metaphor in Nietzsche’s Zarathustra and a doctoral dissertation titled The Thought of Transgression in the Nietzschean Philosophical Project. He attended University of Paris VIII (1977-1979) for his postdoctoral studies. Immediately after, he began a career as a professor at the University of Puerto Rico.

Ramos is also a founding member of the Puerto Rican Society of Philosophy (SPF, in Spanish), which he led from 1989 to 1991. He has been a guest lecturer and researcher at Georgetown University and the City University of New York, as well as universities in Europe, Asia and the Americas. He is a collaborator of the Hispanic Institute for Buddhist Studies and the European interdisciplinary group "Escritura e Imagen".

== Thought ==
Ramos's philosophical thought, as illustrated in his three-volume Aesthetics of Thought, questions thought as a philosophical category in its relation to language (or writing), and consequently, to the Real. His work combines approaches from Ancient philosophy—specifically Heraclitus and Parmenides—with other modern and contemporary traditions, such as Psychoanalysis, Ontology and Buddhism.

== Works ==
=== The Drama of Philosophical Writing (1998): ===
In the first volume of Aesthetics of Thought, Francisco José Ramos establishes a philosophical proposal that concerns aesthetics, not in its conventional philosophical sense, that is, judgments on beauty, but as a type of sensibility. Thought is not addressed as a mental activity, but rather as the plurality of images and configurations that constitute said activity. Fundamental to the proposal of Aesthetics of Thought is the acknowledgment of impermanence as that which escapes any configuration or conceptual framework— the original “articulation” is encoded into the written word or the “movement of thought”, presumed to be violently captured by the concept.

=== The Dance in the Labyrinth (2003): ===
The second volume, Dance in the Labyrinth: Meditation upon Human Action (2003), attends to the particular relationship between philosophical language and art. This volume also poses several questions regarding the connections between philosophical thought and capitalism, specifically, the relationship between thought and the advertising industry. Accordingly, Ramos introduces conceptual distinctions between aesthetics, the work of art, and artistic experience, the last of which is related to the practice of wisdom.

=== The Invention of the Self (2008): ===
The third volume of the trilogy, The Invention of the Self (2008), is conceived as a dialogue between the neurosciences, Psychoanalysis, and Buddhist thought. Therein Ramos outlines connections between mind, body, organism and brain. Ramos distances himself from existing attempts to reduce mental activity to mere neuronal processes— to the dualist separations of mind and body. In doing so, he incorporates the non-dualistic legacy of Heraclitus, Lucretius, Marcus Aurelius, Spinoza, Hume, Nietzsche, Foucault, and Deleuze. Ramos thus puts forth a proposal that accounts for the mind-body problem and the urgent need to reach a different way of thinking about the human condition.

== Bibliography ==
=== Books ===
- Cronografías. Editorial Atlántida. (1982)
- Hacer: Pensar. Colección de escritos filosóficos. Editorial de la UPR. (1984). (Editor).
- Estética del Pensamiento I: el drama de la escritura filosófica. Editorial Fundamentos. (1998).
- Foucault, la historia de la locura como historia de la razón: recopilación de escritos conmemorativos de Historia de la locura. Editorial Tal Cual / Editorial Post Data. (2002). (Editor with Irma Rivera Nieves)
- Estética del pensamiento II: la danza en el laberinto. Editorial Fundamentos. (2003)
- Estética del pensamiento III: la invención de sí mismo. Editorial Fundamentos. (2008)
- La significación del lenguaje poético. Ediciones Antígona. (2012)
- Ética, de Baruch Spinoza. Trad. Manuel Machado. Ediciones Espuela de Plata. (2013). (Editor).
- La ciudad, la amistad, la palabra: encuentros filosóficos con Francisco José Ramos, Enrique Pajón y Diego Tatián. Ediciones Antígona. (2016).
- Erothema. La Palma Ediciones. (2017).
- The Holy Trinity of Power, Success, and Money. Poets, Philosophers, Lovers: On the Writings of Giannina Braschi. University of Pittsburgh Press. (2020).

=== Contributions to edited volumes ===
- “La otra Europa: la escritura americana con sus historias a la deriva”, in Discurso o Imagen: las paradojas de lo sonoro, Ana María Leyra. Editorial Fundamentos. (2003).
- "El envolvimiento: Spinoza y la práctica de la sabiduría", in Spinoza contemporáneo, Montserrat Galcerán Huguet & Mario Esponiza Pino. Tierradenadie. (2009).

=== Articles and essays ===
- "Postfacio", in El imperio de los sueños, by Giannina Braschi. (1988).
- "El espacio público de la filosofía". Diálogos. Vol. 30, No. 66, 1995, pp. 117-136.
- “Tiempo y mito”, in Diccionario Internacional de Hermenéutica. Bilbao. Universidad de Deusto. (1997)
- "La crisis de la crítica". Revista de Ciencias Sociales. Vol. 5, 1998, pp. 96-112.
- "Un aparte con el pensamiento de José Echevarría". Revista Jurídica de la Universidad Interamericana de Puerto Rico. Vol. 33, No. 3, 1999, pp. 381-385.
- "El rodeo de lo inescrutable". La Torre: Revista de la Universidad de Puerto Rico. Vol. 5, No. 18, 2000, p. 619.
- "La significación del lenguaje poético". La Torre: Revista de la Universidad de Puerto Rico. Vol. 8, No. 23, 2002, pp. 63-74.
- "Buda y el budismo: ¿hay tal cosa?". La Torre: Revista de la Universidad de Puerto Rico. Vol. 8, No. 29-30, 2003, pp. 57-73.
- "La oportunidad del momento: Dōgen y la kairosofia Zen". Diálogos. Vol. 40, No. 85, 2005, pp. 127-152.
- "La cultura universitaria". Escritura e Imagen. Vol. 3, 2007, pp. 185-191.
- "Paráfrasis de una mitología conceptual". Diálogos. Vol. 42, No. 90, 2007, pp. 295-306.
- "La sapienza o el amor a la sabiduría". Diálogos. Vol. 42, No. 90, 2007, pp. 9-11.
- "El pensamiento de la gratitud: Schajowicz y Celan". La Torre: Revista de la Universidad de Puerto Rico. Vol. 14, No. 51-52, 2009, pp. 107-120.
- "El espejo del mundo: Discurso de toma de posesión del nombramiento como Académico de Número en la Academia de la Lengua de Puerto Rico". Escritura e Imagen. Vol. 5, 2009, pp. 261-307.
- "Kafka y Fellini: la irrealización de una obra". Escritura e Imagen. Vol. 11, 2015, pp. 199-207.
- "Michel Foucalt: memorias y elucidaciones". Diálogos. Vol. 45, No. 94, 2013, pp. 98-109.
- "Cómo pensar la poesía? (poema, imagen y escritura)". Escritura e Imagen. Vol. 9, 2013, pp. 339-357.
- "La plenitud del vacío: El pensamiento de Dōgen Zenji". Diálogos. Vol. 47, No. 97, 2015, pp. 81-105.
- "La ciencia intuitiva y el concepto de beatitud". Diálogos. Vol. 48, No. 100, 2016, pp. 13-41.
- "La experiencia artística, la vida del pensamiento y los pliegues de lo real". Diálogos. Vol. 48, No. 101, 2017, pp. 11-32.
- "Kairós: A la memoria de Manfred Kerkhoff". Diálogos. Vol. 49, No. 102, 2018, pp. 71-80.
- "La recuperación de la filosofía: Ortega y la idea de principio en Leibniz". Diálogos. Vol. 53, No. 111, 2022, pp. 65-97.

== Selected talks and lectures ==
- Las humanidades: presente y futuro (University of Puerto Rico, 2016).
- La envoltura del tiempo: pensador y poeta Dōgen Zenji (University of Puerto Rico, 2014).
- La filosofía y el tiempo (University of Puerto Rico, 2014).
- La Práctica Zen, el lenguaje y la poesía (Instituto de Estudios Budistas Hispano, 2020).
- La práctica Zen y la oportunidad del momento (Instituto de Estudios Budistas Hispano, 2020).
