= Altos de San Luis =

Puerto Rican mountain ridge

Coordinates: 18°16′04″N 66°01′36″W

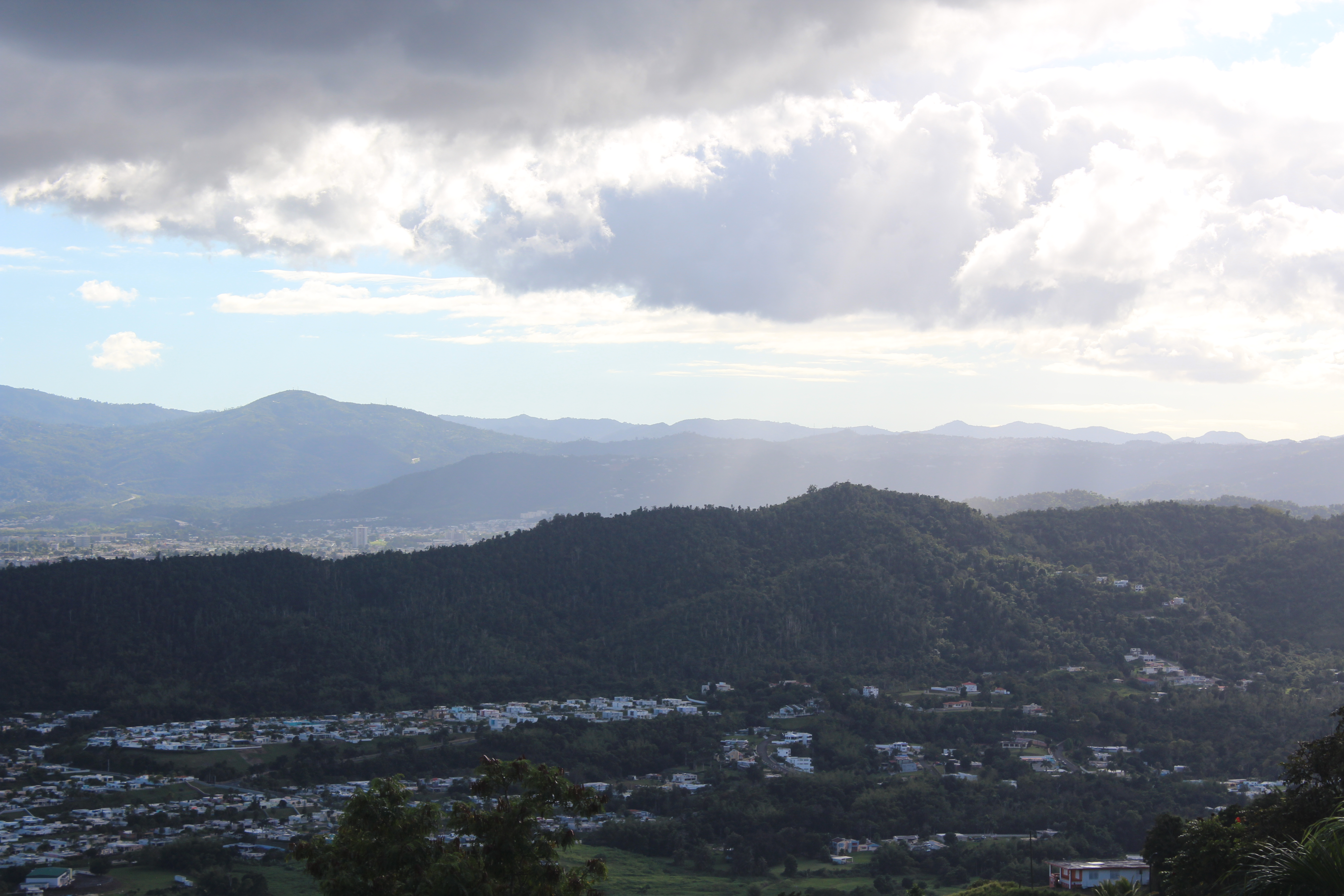
Altos de San Luis as seen from the north in Jaguas, Gurabo. Sierra de Cayey in the background.

Altos de San Luis, also known as Monte Altos de San Luis (Spanish for ''San Luis heights''), is an 886 feet (270 m) high and two-mile-long prominent mountain ridge located on the northern edge of the Caguas Valley, in the barrio of Bairoa of the Puerto Rican municipality of Caguas. The ridge is bordered by the Loíza River to the north and the east, and it forms part of a larger system of mountain ridges that extends from the southwestern end of the Sierra de Luquillo in Gurabo to the northeastern end of the Cordillera Central in Aguas Buenas. Other mountains and hills along this system include the Altos de La Mesa and Cerro La Marquesa. These ridges are shaped by the Great Northern Puerto Rico fault zone (GNPRfz), an active fault zone which crosses the island diagonally from southeast to northwest.

The forested area on the eastern half of the mountain ridge, known as Finca Longo, is federally protected and locally managed by the municipality of Caguas as a critical habitat of the Puerto Rican plain pigeon (Patagioenas inornata wetmorei), locally known as the paloma sabanera. This pigeon has been observed to nest, roost and feed on the habitat created by the secondary forest found here. The forest is home to various endemic species, such as the Puerto Rican owl, and also attracts numerous migratory birds every winter. This protected area, along with various key ecological zones of the Caguas Valley river basin, has been recognized as an Important Bird Area by BirdLife International since 2007.

== See also ==
- Geology of Puerto Rico
- Altos de La Mesa
- Cordillera Central
- Sierra de Luquillo
