= Turabo River =

River of Puerto Rico

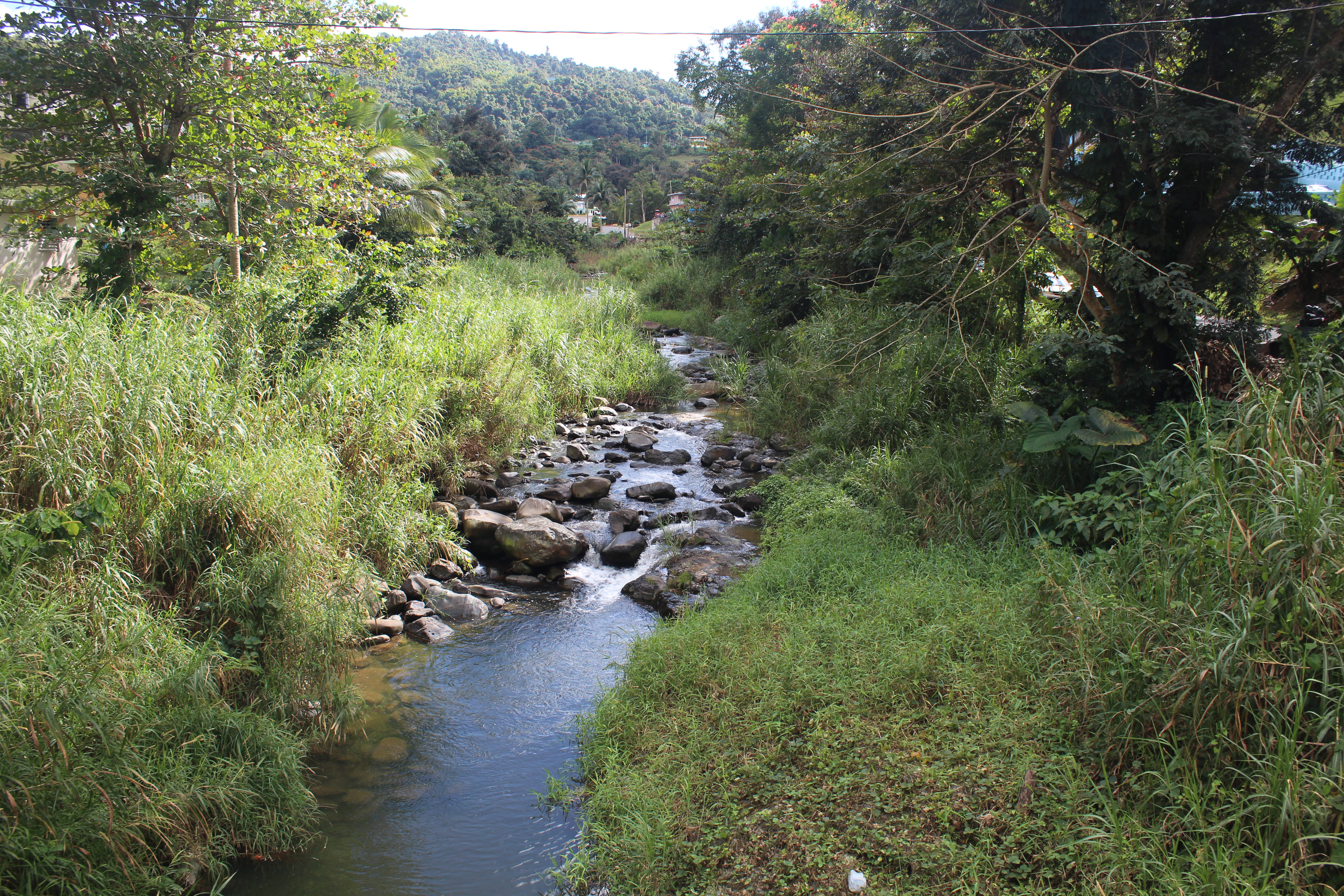
- Turabo River near El Cantil.
- Native name: Río Turabo (Spanish)

Location
- Commonwealth: Puerto Rico
- Municipality: Caguas

Physical characteristics
- Source
  - location: San Salvador, Caguas
  - coordinates: 18.2257889°N 66.0159982°W
- Mouth
  - location: Loíza River in Tomás de Castro, Caguas

The Turabo River (Spanish: Río Turabo) is a river of Caguas, Puerto Rico.

== See also ==
- List of rivers of Puerto Rico
