= Terrazo =

1947 book by Abelardo Diaz Alfaro

Terrazo is a book written in 1947 by Puerto Rican writer Abelardo Díaz Alfaro. The book won many awards, including that of the Sociedad de Periodistas Universitario y Instituto de Literatura Puertorriqueña, and made it to the national libraries of many other Latin American countries where Diaz Alfaro was a known and respected writer.

Terrazo tells the stories, in fiction, of various Puerto Rican villages and people. The majority of these stories are told from the perspective of "jíbaros" (simple country people with little to no education). The stories use jíbaro language, which is slang Spanish. The writer's father was a social worker in Puerto Rico and passed these stories to A. David Alfaro. The stories, while fiction, are based on stories they heard or were told by the country people. Its 20 chapters, while made up of fictional stories, talk in comical terms about the way many of the jíbaros used to talk and describe their lives and their reasoning, such as how they perceived Santa Claus.

The book has been considered by many as one of the tools that helped Puerto Rican people realize the ways, stories and life of the poor in Puerto Rico's past.
