= Xcelencia =

La Equis formerly known as Xcelencia
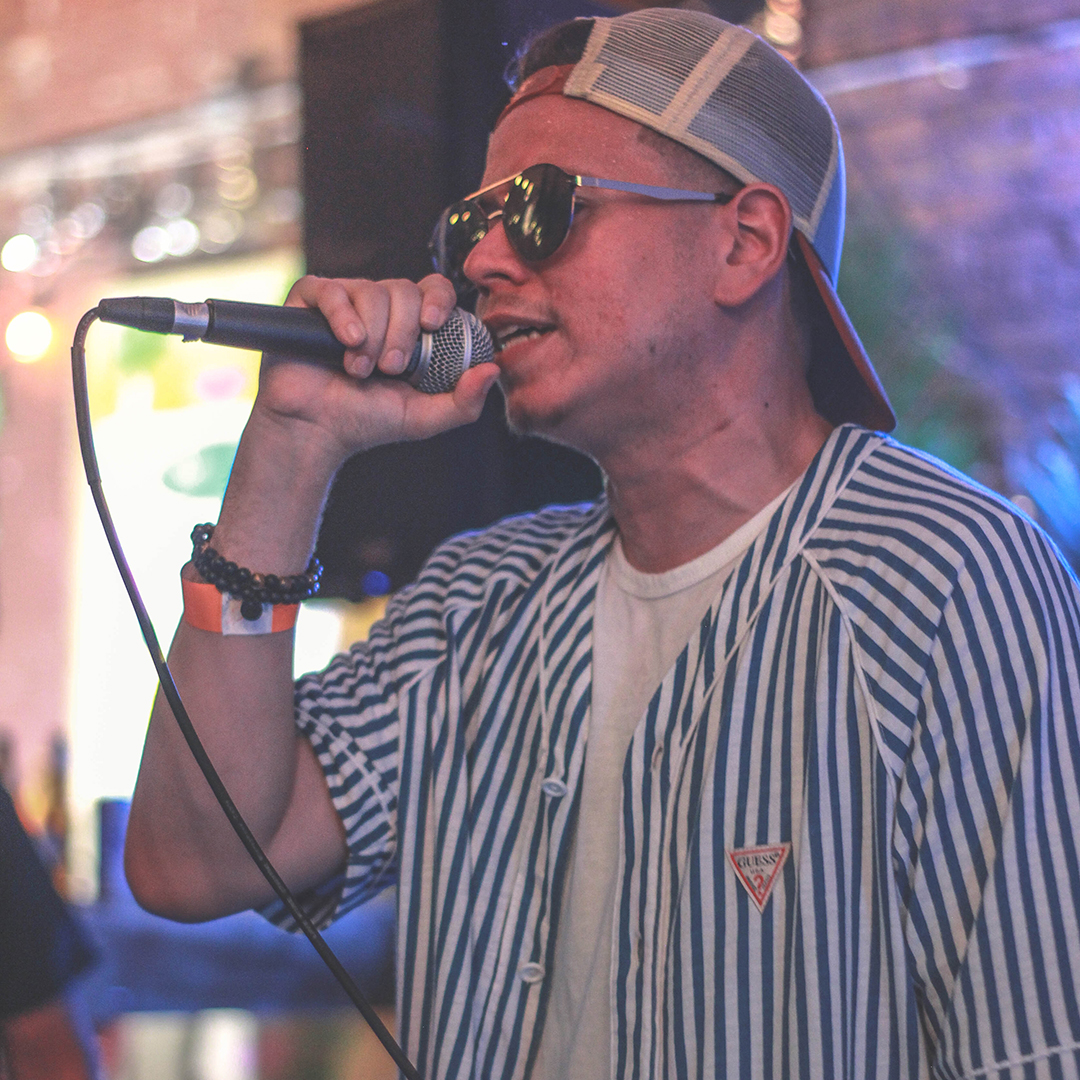
- Xcelencia performing live
- Born: Calixto Gabriel Bravo Serrano; April 6, 1991 (age 35); Caguas, Puerto Rico
- Occupations: Recording artist, songwriter, producer, engineer
- Years active: 2013-present
- Musical career
- Genres: Reggaeton, Latin Music
- Instruments: Vocals, Keyboard
- Label: SIGUE TU IMAGINACION

Calixto Gabriel Bravo Serrano (born April 6, 1991), known professionally as La Equis (formerly Xcelencia), is a Puerto Rican songwriter, musician, and technologist born in Caguas, Puerto Rico, of Puerto Rican and Cuban descent. He is known for blending genres such as Reggaeton, Electronic, Hip Hop and Latin pop with new technologies and independent music strategies. LA EQUIS has amassed over 55 million global streams, and his catalog has earned recognition through sync placements in Daredevil: Born Again, The Horror of Dolores Roach, Promised Land, and the MLB The Show video game series. In 2024, he was also featured as the official voice of Papa Johns in a national U.S. campaign—marking a major milestone in his crossover work.

As an early adopter of blockchain in music, he has generated over $150,000 in onchain sales and crowdfunding, including a $50,000 NFT crowdfund for his multimedia project Infinxte. In 2023, he released El Niño Estrella as a dynamic NFT album, which evolves based on Spotify streaming milestones. He is the founder of Shifted Culture Records and Sonido, a Web3 community for Spanish-language artists. LA EQUIS is a recipient of honors from the Independent Music Awards and the ' John Lennon Songwriting Contest, reflecting both creative and commercial recognition in his career.

== Early life and career beginnings ==
Born in Caguas, Puerto Rico in 1991, to a Puerto Rican mother and Cuban father, Xcelencia's family moved to the United States in 1996 in search of a new life and opportunities. Xcelencia got his start in 2012 with the release of his single “Gravedad” which won the “El Headliner” prize presented by MTV Tres and OurStage and was featured on Music My Güey, Free Latin Music, Blogamole and Lo Que Te Pica.” The following year Xcelencia released his first single “Estilito Que Enamora” along with the music video which was also featured by MTV3's Dame Un Break.

== 2014-2016: Underrated, MTV3, and awards ==
In 2014, Xcelencia released his first mixtape titled “Underrated” which featured his most popular songs and his debut singles, “Estilito Que Enamora”, “My Baby”, and “Beleza Do Caribe.”

Xcelencia has been featured on MTV3, Sirius Xm Radio, and his follow-up project Enigma won an Independent Music Award for best Latin album in an event that was held in the Lincoln center in New York City. Xcelencia has also won the finalist and Grand Prize in the Latin category of the popular John Lennon Songwriting Contest. He was also part of the Latin finalists in the International Songwriting Competition.

== 2017-2018 ==
In 2017 Xcelencia announced his new concept titled I Am: Xcelencia, an artist playlist on Spotify where he will be releasing a digital single every week on the platform before the release of his next official single. After the success of his last album reaching over 2 million plays across Spotify, Xcelencia announces new single in collaboration with independent distributor Symphonic Distribution

== 2019-2020 ==
With more than 270,000 monthly listeners on Spotify from Chile, Mexico, Argentina or Peru, Xcelencia on March 22 released his latest single "Te Sigo Soñando" produced by Argentinian beat maker Shine, who has worked for artists like J Alvarez or Ken-Y, reaching 100,000 streams in its first week of release. On October 16, 2019, Xcelencia was announced as part of the first wave of performers invited to showcase at the SXSW 2020 music festival. New single Buscarte it out as part of a new album where Xcelencia will release a song every Friday across all the digital music platforms

Xcelencia was featured on SoundCloud Studio Sessions: The Bridge, a contest series that brings four talented artists together to make a hit record in under eight hours, the song "Winter in Miami" was released exclusively on SoundCloud Featured on Songtradr's monthly mixdown for a second time, Xcelencia talked about how he is coping with COVID19 as a recording artist and his newly launched recording studio.

== 2021-present ==
In 2021, LA EQUIS (formerly Xcelencia) released the EP El Niño Que Gritó Lobo through his label Shifted Culture. Inspired by the fable The Boy Who Cried Wolf, the project explored themes of trust and emotion. It featured production from Shine, Columbo Sounds, and Electrólogo, blending afrobeat, reggaeton, TrapnB, and Latin pop. The single “Ahora” touched on social division and mental health, and a virtual tour was announced to support the release. In 2021, LA EQUIS was selected as part of Taco Bell’s Feed the Beat program, joining a roster of emerging artists supported through touring and promotional resources. Xcelencia launched a crowdfunding campaign on Mirror.xyz to support his multimedia album project, Infinxte. The campaign successfully raised approximately $50,000 in cryptocurrency through the sale of NFTs, offering supporters access to exclusive content, live events, and other perks.

Xcelencia joined Sound in 2022 with his first drop, “Soltera,” selling 25 editions and earning 1.75 ETH. Since then, he has released over 10 tracks on the platform, reaching more than 17,000 collectors and generating over 12 ETH in sales volume. He also launched Sonido, a community for Latin and Spanish-language artists on Sound, and has been an early participant in the platform’s Latin channel.

In July 2023, Xcelencia launched El Niño Estrella as an “evolving, dynamic collectible,” blending music with blockchain technology. The NFT changed visually each time the album reached over 100,000 monthly streams on Spotify. Buyers also received access to a private Telegram group, behind-the-scenes content, rewards tied to monthly updates, and airdrops. The project was cited as an example of how NFTs can be used creatively for fan engagement and digital media innovation.

In 2024, Xcelencia shared his approach to earning over $100,000 as an independent artist by combining music with blockchain tools for his release, El Niño Estrella.

In addition to his music career, Xcelencia was featured as the voice of Papa Johns in a national advertising campaign in the United States. In 2025, he transitioned to the name LA EQUIS as part of a rebrand tied to the release of his album El Niño Maravilla and broader multimedia projects.

== Sync Placements ==
Xcelencia's music has been featured in several television series and video games. Notable placements include:

- Daredevil: Born Again – Season 1, Episode 2: "Optics" (March 4, 2025)
- The Horror of Dolores Roach – Season 1, Episode 4: "Bitch, I've Already Been to Prison" and Episode 6: "Blink Twice" (July 7, 2023)
- Promised Land – Season 1, Episode 9: "La Cosecha (The Harvest)" (March 22, 2022)
- Multiple placements in the MLB The Show video game series

== Discography ==
=== Albums ===
- Underrated (July 4, 2014)
- Enigma (January 29, 2016)
- El Niño Estrella (April 4, 2024)

=== Playlists ===
- I Am: Xcelencia (August 18, 2017)
- Insomnio (October 25, 2019)

=== EP's ===
- Amnesia (November 9, 2018)
- El Niño Que Grito Lobo (January 29, 2021)

=== Singles ===
- Estilito Que Enamora (2013)
- My Baby (2013)
- Beleza Do Caribe (2014)
- Loco Por Amarla (2015)
- Me Mata (2016)
- Privilegio (2018)
- Ocultos (2018)
- Letal (2018)
- Deja Vu (2018)
- Te Sigo Soñando (2019)
- Vybes (2019)
- Buscarte (2019)
- Otra Noche (2019)
- Dejame Bajarle (2020)
- El Pasado (2020)
- Banco (2020)
- Palabra (2020)
- Ahora (2021)
- Tabu (2022)
- Real (2022)
- Isla Verde (2022)
- El Party (2022)
- Soltera (2022)
- Anatomia (2022)
- Happy (2022)
- 3AM (2022)
- La Rumba (2022)
- OMW (2022)
- Cancun (2023)
- Eleven (2023)
- Las Nike (2023)
- Moet (2024)
- Spotify (2024)
- Chimbita (2024)
- Reggaeton (2024)
- Caile (2024)

== Awards ==
Year	Competition	Category	Song	Result	Ref
2014	John Lennon Songwriting Contest	Latin Song	Beleza Do Caribe	Finalist	
2014	International Songwriting Competition	Latin Song	Beleza Do Caribe	Finalist	
2015	John Lennon Songwriting Contest	Latin	Infinito	Grand Prize Winner	
2015	International Songwriting Competition	Latin Song	Infinito	Finalist	
2016	15th Annual Independent Music Awards	Best Latin Album	Enigma	Winner	
