= San Salvador, Caguas, Puerto Rico =

Barrio of Puerto Rico

San Salvador
- Barrio
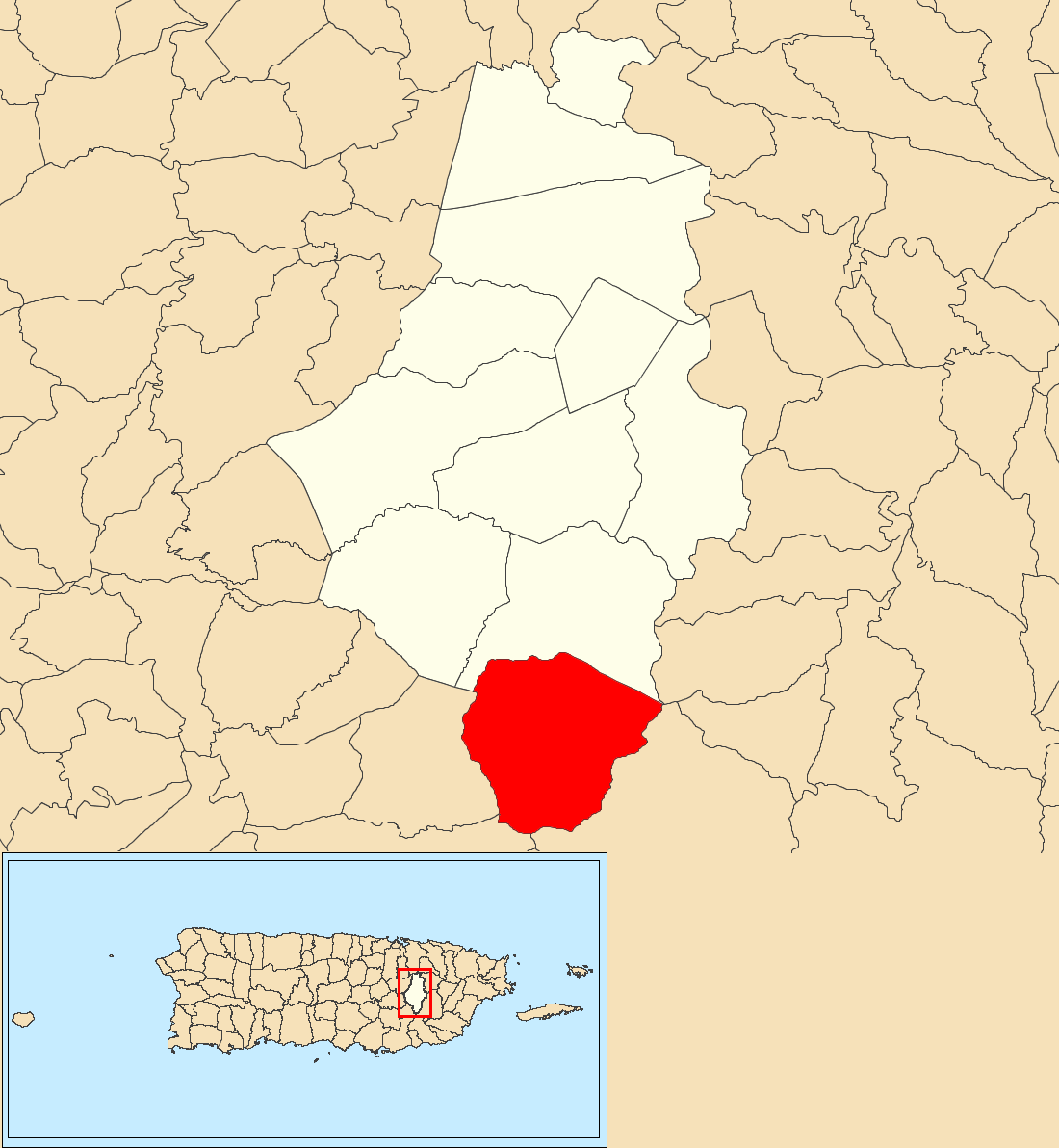
- Location of San Salvador within the municipality of Caguas shown in red

- Location of Puerto Rico
- Coordinates: 18°08′14″N 66°02′50″W
- Commonwealth: Puerto Rico
- Municipality: Caguas

Area
  - Total: 6.62 sq mi (17.1 km^{2})
  - Land: 6.62 sq mi (17.1 km^{2})
  - Water: 0.00 sq mi (0 km^{2})
- Elevation: 1,152 ft (351 m)

Population (2010)
  - Total: 3,089
  - Density: 466.6/sq mi (180.2/km^{2})
- Source: 2010 Census
- Time zone: UTC−4 (AST)
- ZIP code: 00725, 00726, 00727
- Area codes: 787, 939

San Salvador is a barrio in the municipality of Caguas, Puerto Rico. Its population in 2010 was 3,089.

== History ==
San Salvador was in Spain's gazetteers until Puerto Rico was ceded by Spain in the aftermath of the Spanish–American War under the terms of the Treaty of Paris of 1898 and became an unincorporated territory of the United States. In 1899, the United States Department of War conducted a census of Puerto Rico finding that the population of San Salvador barrio was 1,605.

Historical population
Census	Pop.	Note	%±
1900	1,605		—
1910	1,594		−0.7%
1920	2,407		51.0%
1930	3,162		31.4%
1940	3,378		6.8%
1950	2,863		−15.2%
1960	2,773		−3.1%
1970	2,129		−23.2%
1980	2,336		9.7%
1990	3,004		28.6%
2000	3,272		8.9%
2010	3,089		−5.6%
U.S. Decennial Census; 1899 (shown as 1900) 1910-1930; 1930-1950 1980-2000 2010

== See also ==
- List of communities in Puerto Rico
