= List of caves in Puerto Rico =

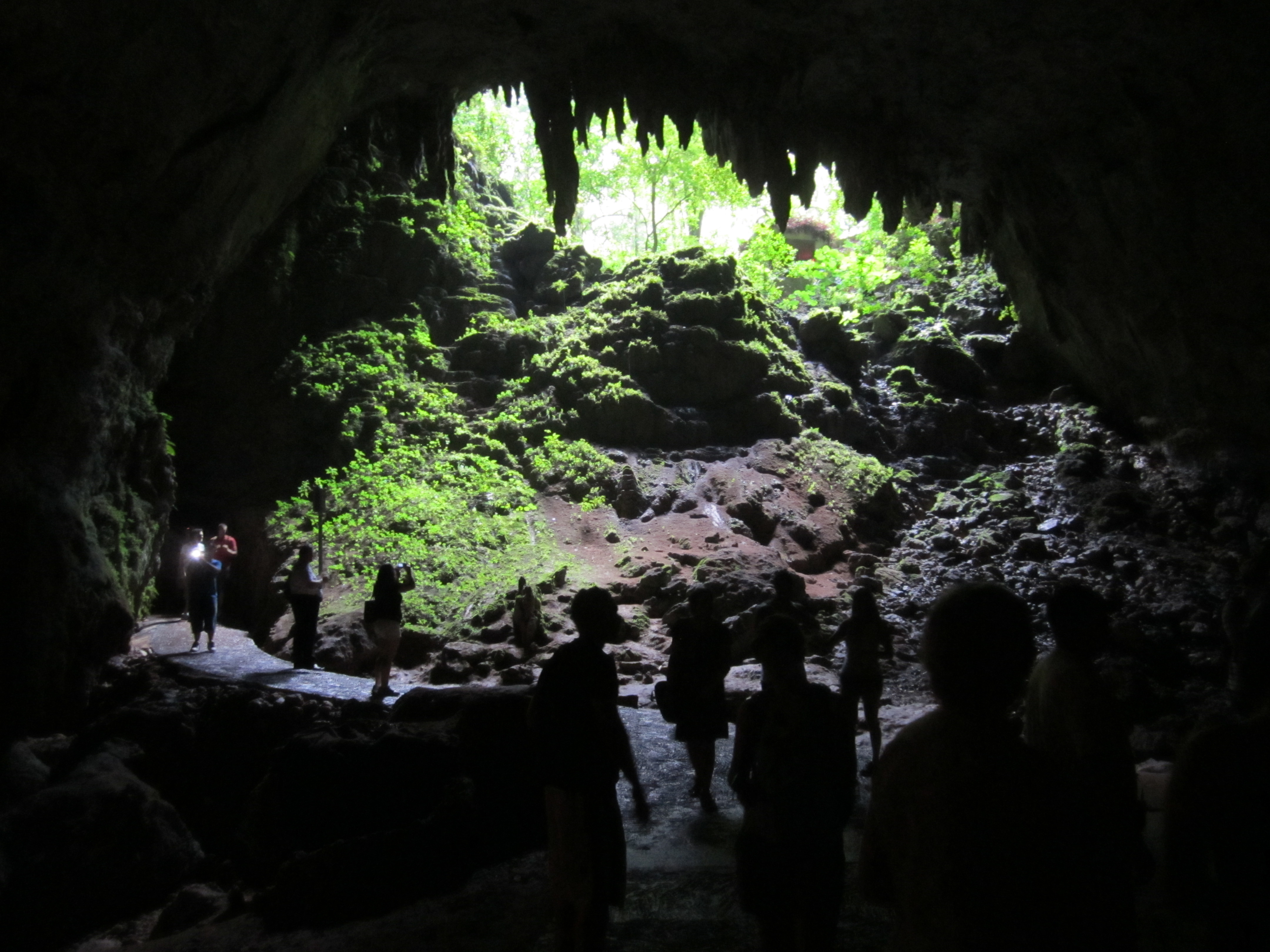
Cueva Clara in Parque Nacional de las Cavernas del Río Camuy.

This is a list of caves in Puerto Rico.

- Aguas Buenas Cave System
- Cavernas del Río Camuy
- Cueva de Los Indios
- Cueva del Indio
- Cueva del Indio (Arecibo)
- Cueva La Espiral
- Cueva Lucero
- Cueva Sorbeto
- Cueva Ventana
- Cuevas Las Cabachuelas
- Pozo de Jacinto
