= Dancing On Tables =

Scottish band

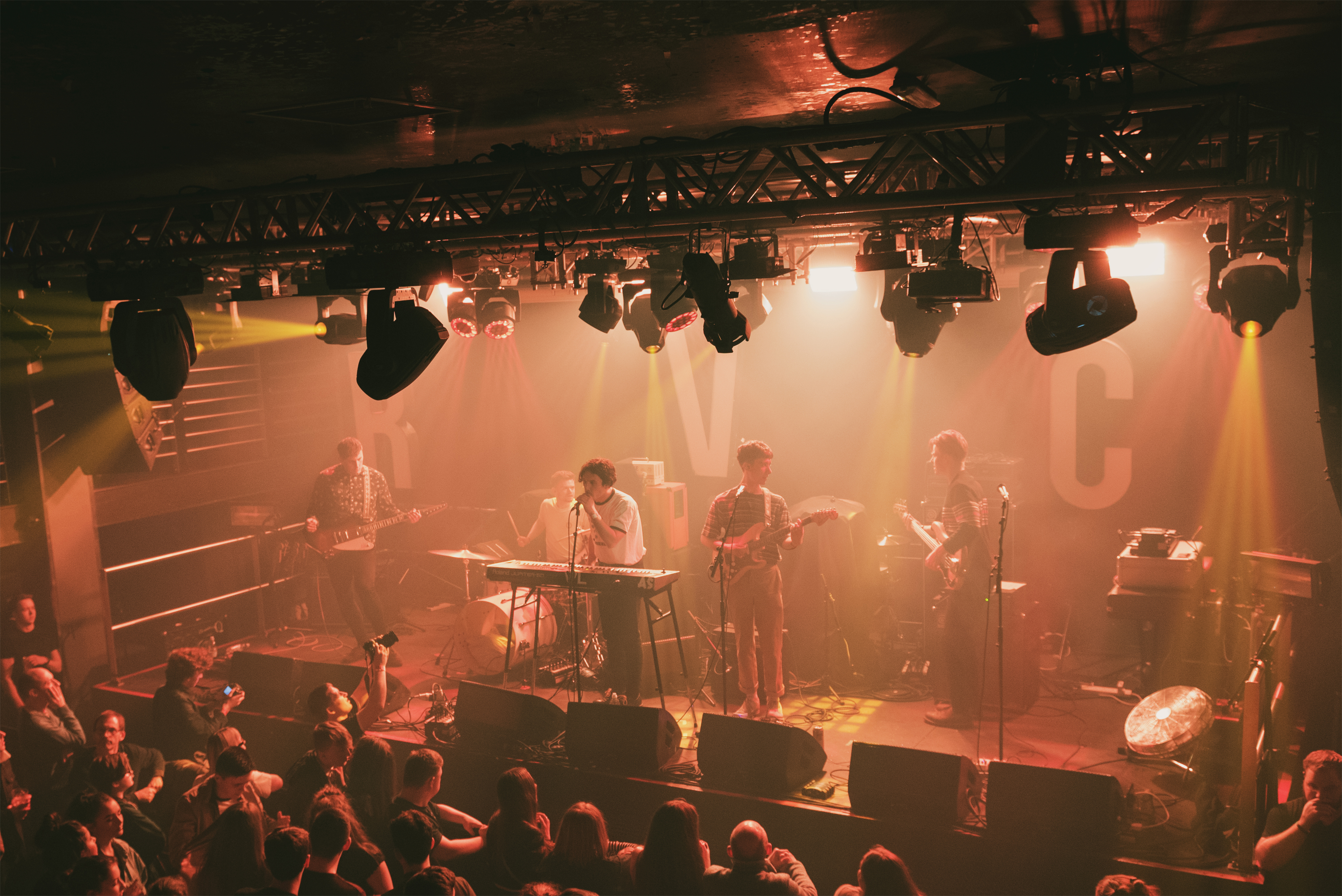
- Dancing On Tables performing at Liquid Rooms, Edinburgh, March 2018

Background information
- Origin: Dunfermline, Fife, Scotland
- Genres: Alternative rock; pop rock; pop; indie pop
- Years active: 2014 – 2023
- Label: LV Music
- Members: Robbie McSkimming; Callum Thomas; Hamish Finlayson; Gregor Stobie; Reece Dobbin
- Website: dancingontables.co.uk

Dancing On Tables were a Scottish pop-rock band from Dunfermline, Fife, Scotland, who formed in 2014 as bored school friends who happened to play the right instruments. The band consisted of Robbie McSkimming (lead vocals, keyboard ), Callum Thomas (lead vocals, guitar), Hamish Finlayson (guitar), Gregor Stobie (bass, backing vocals) and Reece Dobbin (drums).

Beginning with playing friend's parties and school halls, their journey saw them play UK arenas with Catfish and the Bottlemen, soundtrack Schuh x Adidas campaign and be named by Variety Magazine as one of 10 Brits to Watch for 2018. Others in this list included; Jorja Smith, Edward Holcroft and Sophie Skelton.

In November 2017, the band signed to Nashville-based record label LV Music.

In April 2018, Robbie McSkimming appeared as a contestant on the BBC quiz show Pointless.

In June 2023, it was revealed that the band would be splitting after 8 years together. They played their final show on 15 July 2023.
