= Cagüitas River =

River of Puerto Rico

Coordinates: 18.2585651°N 66.0132205°W

- Native name: Río Cagüitas (Spanish)

Location
- Commonwealth: Puerto Rico
- Municipality: Caguas

Physical characteristics
- Source
  - location: Ermita Cave in Sumidero, Aguas Buenas
- Mouth
  - location: Loíza River in Bairoa, Caguas
  - elevation: 151 ft.

Basin features
- Tributaries
  - right: Cañaboncito River

The Cagüitas River (Spanish: Río Cagüitas) is a tributary of the Loíza River that flows through the municipalities of Caguas and Aguas Buenas, Puerto Rico.

== Geography ==
The Cagüitas River is one of the two main streams that traverse the Caguas Valley from west to east (the other being the Bairoa River), both of which emptying into the Loíza River. Due to its hydrology, the river has played a critical role in the history of the agricultural development of the Valley of Caguas, particularly in the establishment of numerous sugarcane plantations throughout its course in the valley.

The Cagüitas has its primary source in Cueva Ermita, one of the many caves that comprise the Aguas Buenas Cavern System. From there it flows down to the Valley of Caguas, passing by Cerro Borrás and the Caguas Botanical Garden (the site of the former Hacienda San José sugarcane plantation) before reaching the area of Caguas Pueblo, where it is fed by the Cañaboncito River close to the former Hacienda Santa Catalina. It then flows into the Loíza River after passing the site of the former Hacienda Santa Juana.

== Ecology ==
In addition to its geological importance as part of the wider ecosystem of the Aguas Buenas Cave and Caverns System Nature Reserve, the Cagüitas River feeds into secondary forests that are critical for the conservation of the Puerto Rican plain pigeon (Patagioenas inornata wetmorei). The Cagüitas, along with other riparian areas along the La Plata and Loíza basins of central eastern Puerto Rico, has been designated an Important Bird Area by BirdLife International since 2007.

In recent years, the Cagüitas and many other similar rivers in the island have suffered from the effects of the invasive pleco (Pterygoplichthys multiradiatus), as their populations have greatly increased since they do not have any natural predators in Puerto Rico.

== Recreation ==
In addition to the William Miranda Marín Botanical and Cultural Garden, which the Cagüitas crosses from west to east, the municipality also established Paseo Honor al Río, a boardwalk with public art and gazebos that stretches along the river from Plaza Villa Blanca, close to Caguas Pueblo, to Plaza Centro. There are plans to extend the boardwalk by connecting it to the botanical garden itself.

== See also ==
- List of rivers of Puerto Rico
