= Viñales =

- Municipality
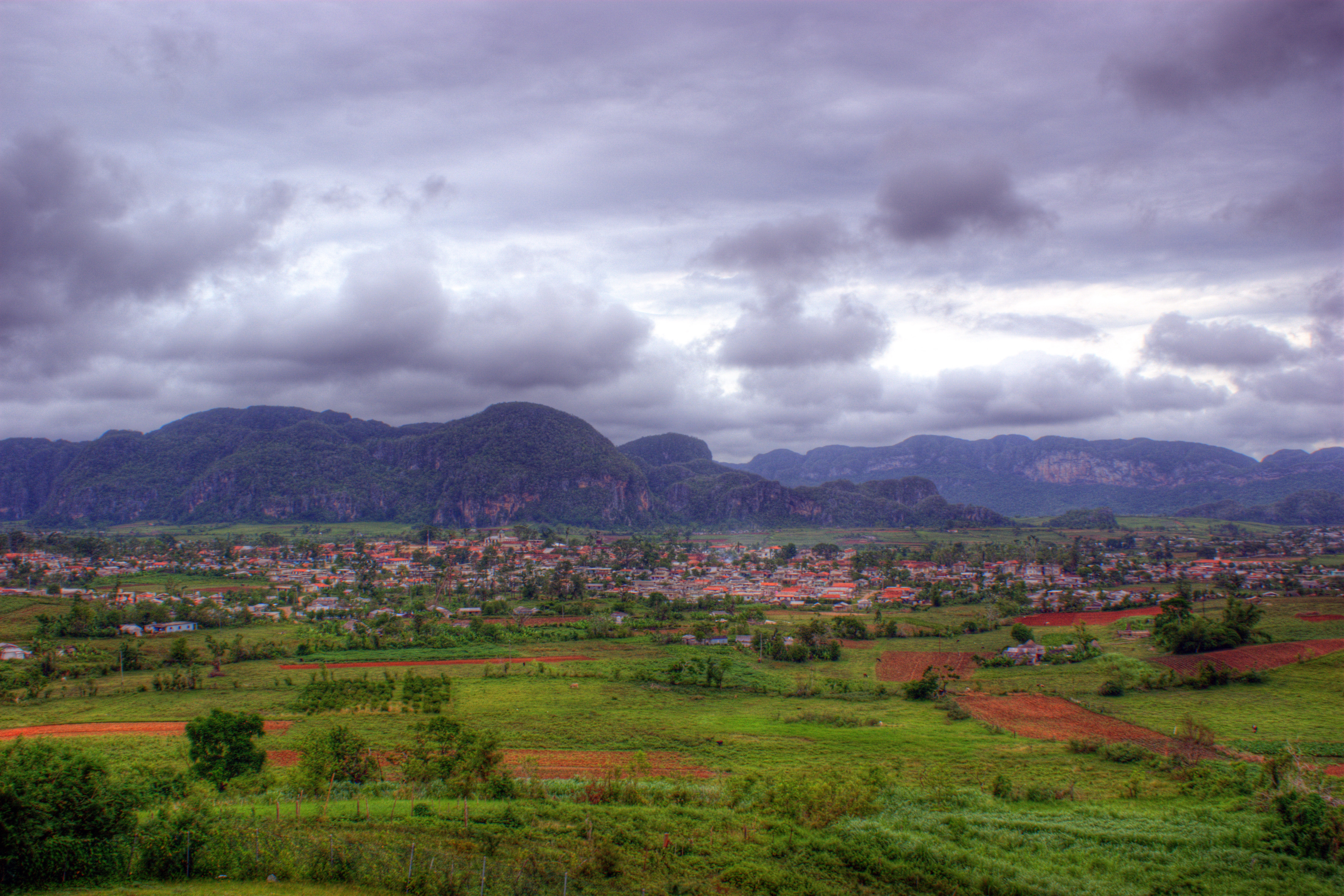

- Coat of arms

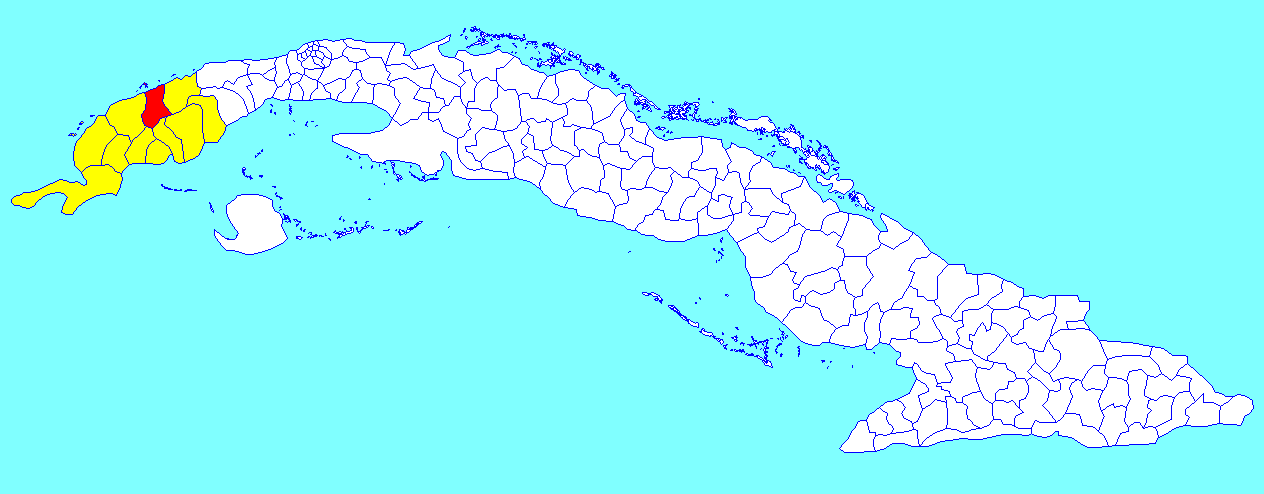
- Viñales municipality (red) within Pinar del Río Province (yellow) and Cuba
- Coordinates: 22°36′55″N 83°42′57″W
- Country: Cuba
- Province: Pinar del Río
- Settled: 1871
- Established: 1878

Area
  - Municipality: 704 km^{2} (272 sq mi)
- Elevation: 135 m (443 ft)

Population (2022)
  - Municipality: 28,740
  - Density: 40.8/km^{2} (106/sq mi)
  - Urban: 17,334
  - Rural: 11,406
- Time zone: UTC-5 (EST)
- Area code: +53-48

Viñales is a town and municipality in the north-central Pinar del Río Province of Cuba. The town consists mostly of one-story wooden houses with porches. The municipality is dominated by low mountain ranges of the Cordillera de Guaniguanico such as Sierra de los Órganos. Typical outcrops known as mogotes complete the karstic character of the landscape.

The town and the Viñales Valley immediately to the north were made a UNESCO World Heritage Site in November 1999 for the karst landscape and traditional agriculture as well as vernacular architecture, crafts and music.

== History ==
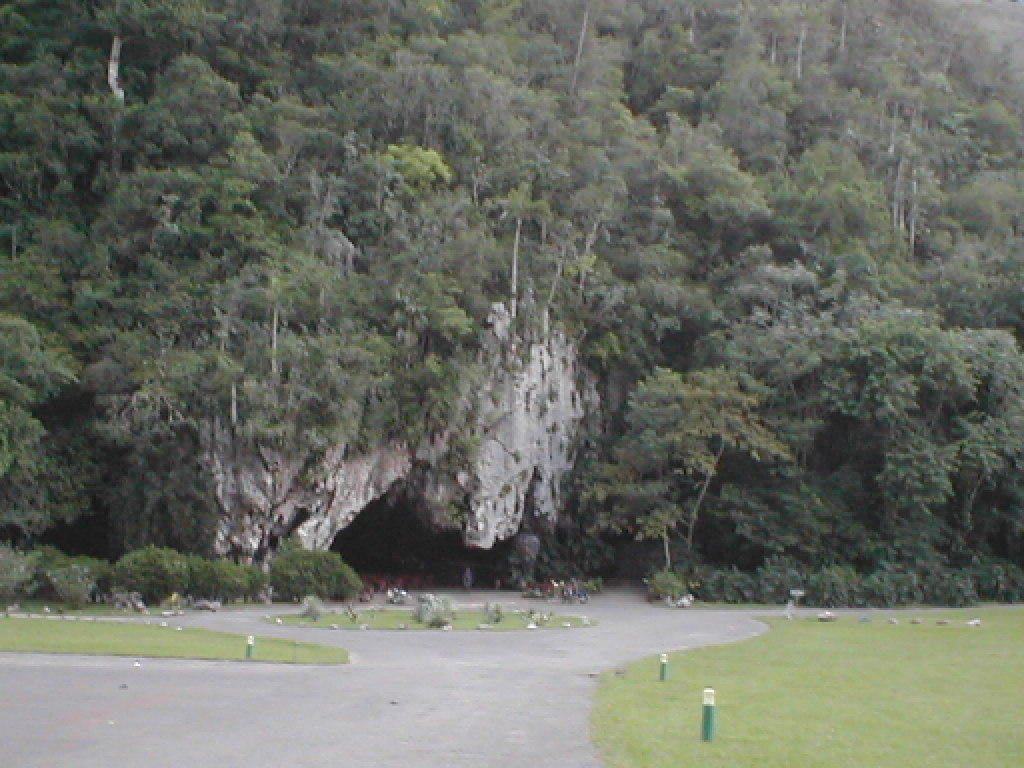
Viñales Indian caves: Palenque de los Cimarrones

Before European settlement, the area was the home of a remnant Taíno population swelled with runaway slaves. The area was colonised at the beginning of the 1800s by tobacco growers from the Canary Islands, who settled in the Vuelta Abajo region. The first colonial settlement in Viñales is documented in 1871, in the form of a ranch belonging to Andrés Hernández Ramos. The town was established in 1878 as a typical community, with church, school, hospital and recreation park.

== Economy ==
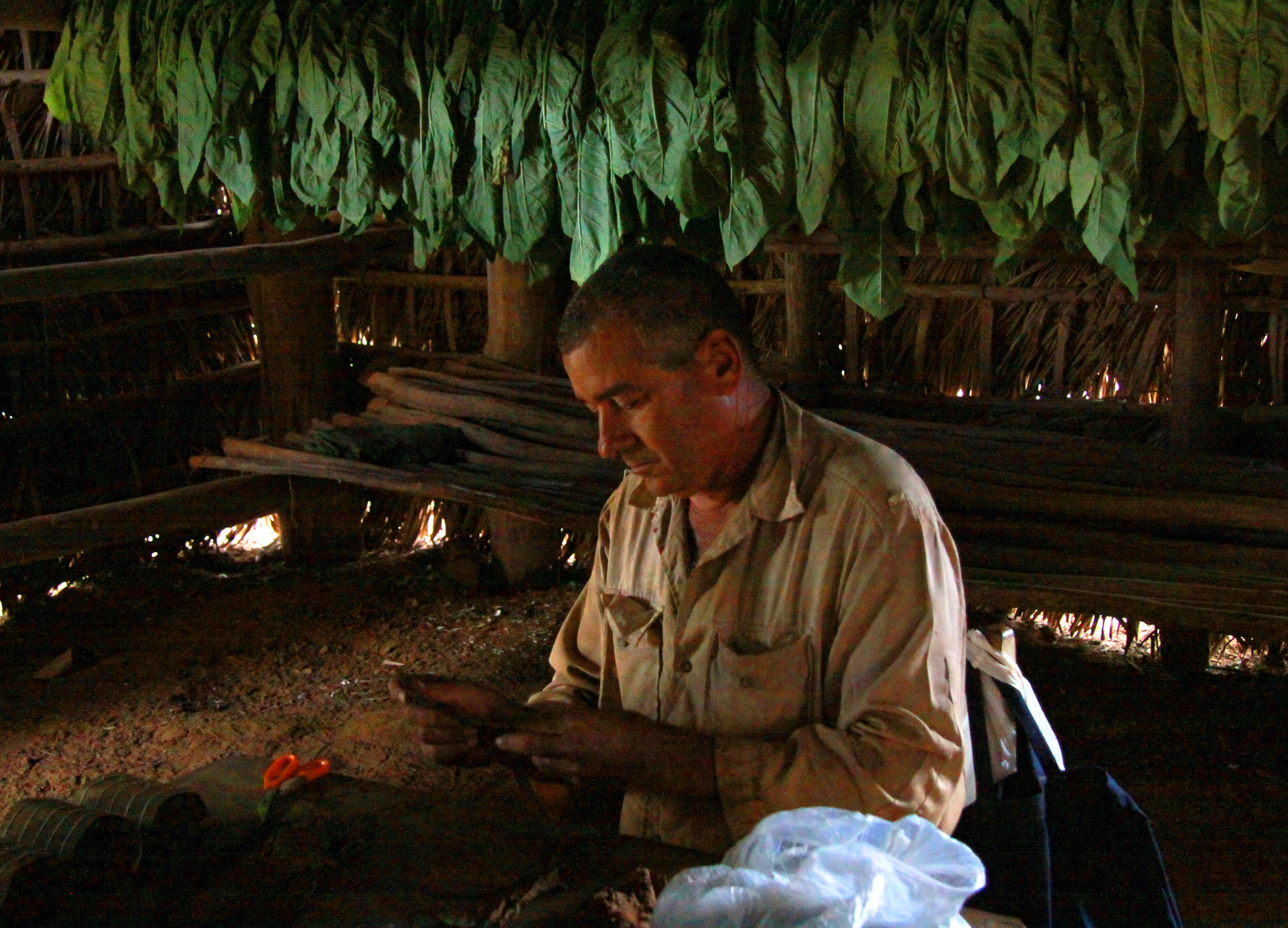
Traditional tobacco drying

Viñales is an agricultural area, where crops of fruit, vegetables, coffee and especially tobacco are grown by traditional methods. Fishing is also an important part of the area's economy.

=== Tourism ===
Tourism centered on the Viñales Valley is developing, the area being protected by constitution since February 1976, and declared a national monument in October 1978.

Tourism in Viñales has grown significantly. The area was designated for protection under the constitution in February 1976 and declared a National Monument in October 1978. The Viñales Valley was added to the UNESCO World Heritage Site list in November 1999 for its outstanding karst landscape, traditional agriculture, vernacular architecture, arts, and music. Attractions in Viñales include the Mural de la Prehistoria, tobacco plantations such as Alejandro Robaina's and the Casa del Veguero, the Viñales Municipal Museum, Casa de Caridad Botanical Gardens, Paleontological Museum (Viñales), the Maroon village Palenque, the village of Los Acuáticos, and the nearby caves «Cueva del Indio, Cueva de José Miguel, Cueva de Santo Tomás» which were shelters for runaway slaves within Viñales National Park.

Casas particulares (private residences that have been tailored and licensed to operate as bed and breakfasts) offer accommodations to visitors year-round. There are also three hotels located a few kilometers outside of town, rated three stars: La Ermita, Los Jazmines, and Rancho Horizontes San Vicente. The campground Dos Hermanas has 54 cabins available to tourists, a swimming pool and a restaurant.

== Climate ==
Viñales has a tropical monsoon climate according to the Köppen climate classification, with a hot, lengthy wet season, and a warm and relatively short dry season. The average temperatures range from highs of 31.7 °C and lows of 22 °C in July and August to 26.2 °C and 16.1 °C in February. April–November represents the wet season, being especially wet May–October. December–March is the dry season, however only December and March qualify as true dry season months, as the threshold for such a month is less than 60 millimeters. The rainiest month in Viñales is June, with 226 millimeters, and the driest is December with 50 millimeters.

Climate data for Viñales
Month	Jan	Feb	Mar	Apr	May	Jun	Jul	Aug	Sep	Oct	Nov	Dec	Year
Mean daily maximum °C (°F)	26.4 (79.5)	26.2 (79.2)	28.1 (82.6)	30.0 (86.0)	30.8 (87.4)	30.8 (87.4)	31.7 (89.1)	31.7 (89.1)	31.2 (88.2)	29.9 (85.8)	27.9 (82.2)	26.8 (80.2)	29.3 (84.7)
Daily mean °C (°F)	21.3 (70.3)	21.1 (70.0)	22.8 (73.0)	24.6 (76.3)	25.7 (78.3)	26.3 (79.3)	26.8 (80.2)	26.8 (80.2)	26.5 (79.7)	25.3 (77.5)	23.1 (73.6)	21.7 (71.1)	24.3 (75.8)
Mean daily minimum °C (°F)	16.3 (61.3)	16.1 (61.0)	17.6 (63.7)	19.3 (66.7)	20.7 (69.3)	21.8 (71.2)	22.0 (71.6)	22.0 (71.6)	21.8 (71.2)	20.8 (69.4)	18.4 (65.1)	16.6 (61.9)	19.5 (67.0)
Average rainfall mm (inches)	60 (2.4)	62 (2.4)	56 (2.2)	83 (3.3)	173 (6.8)	226 (8.9)	184 (7.2)	207 (8.1)	216 (8.5)	151 (5.9)	72 (2.8)	50 (2.0)	1,540 (60.5)
Source: Climate-Data.org

== Demographics ==
In 2022, the municipality of Viñales had a population of 28,740 with a 0.33%/year increase. With a total area of 704 km^{2} (272 sq mi), it has a population density of 41/km^{2} (110/sq mi).

== Gallery ==
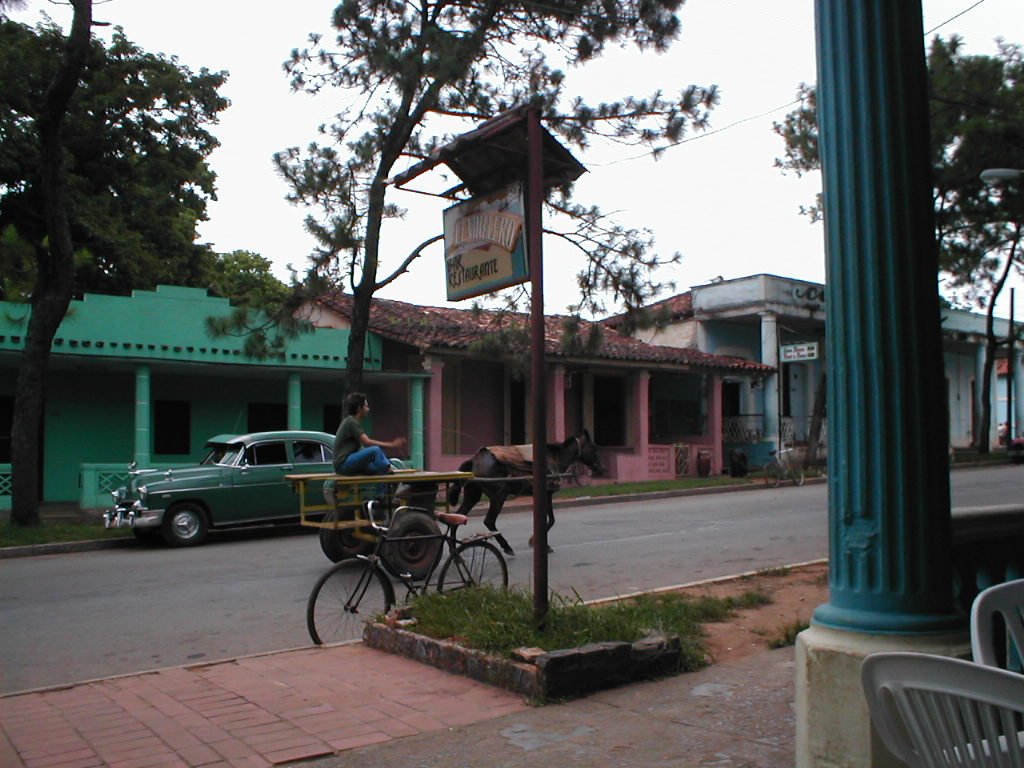
A man rides down the main street in Viñales

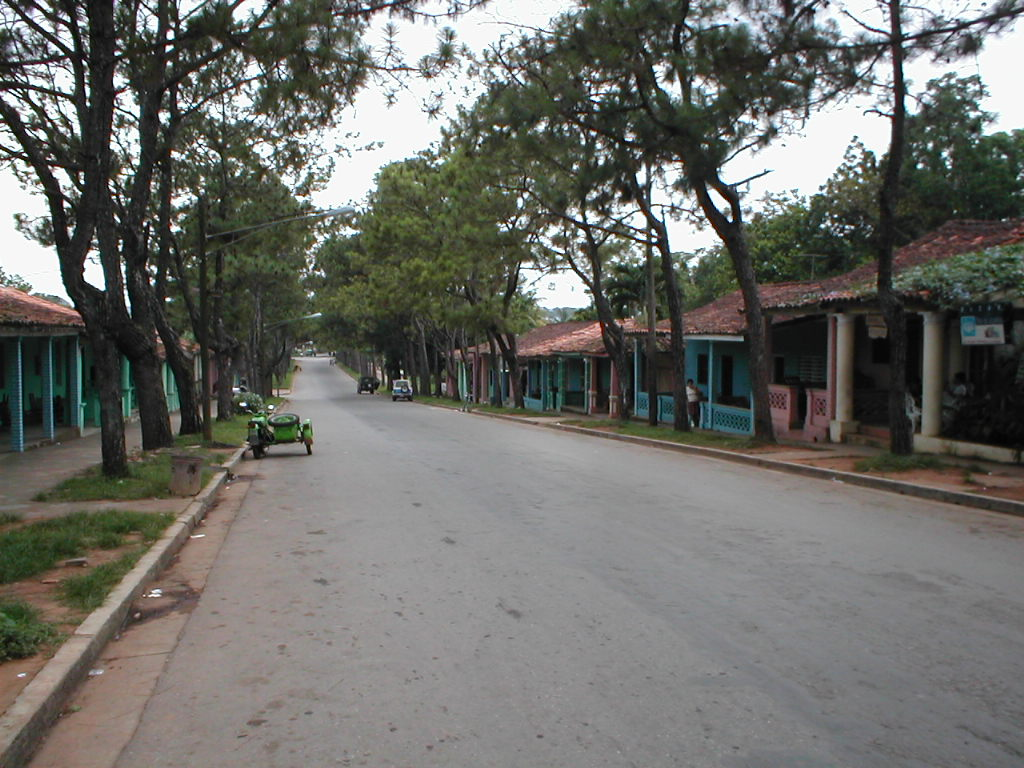
Downtown Viñales

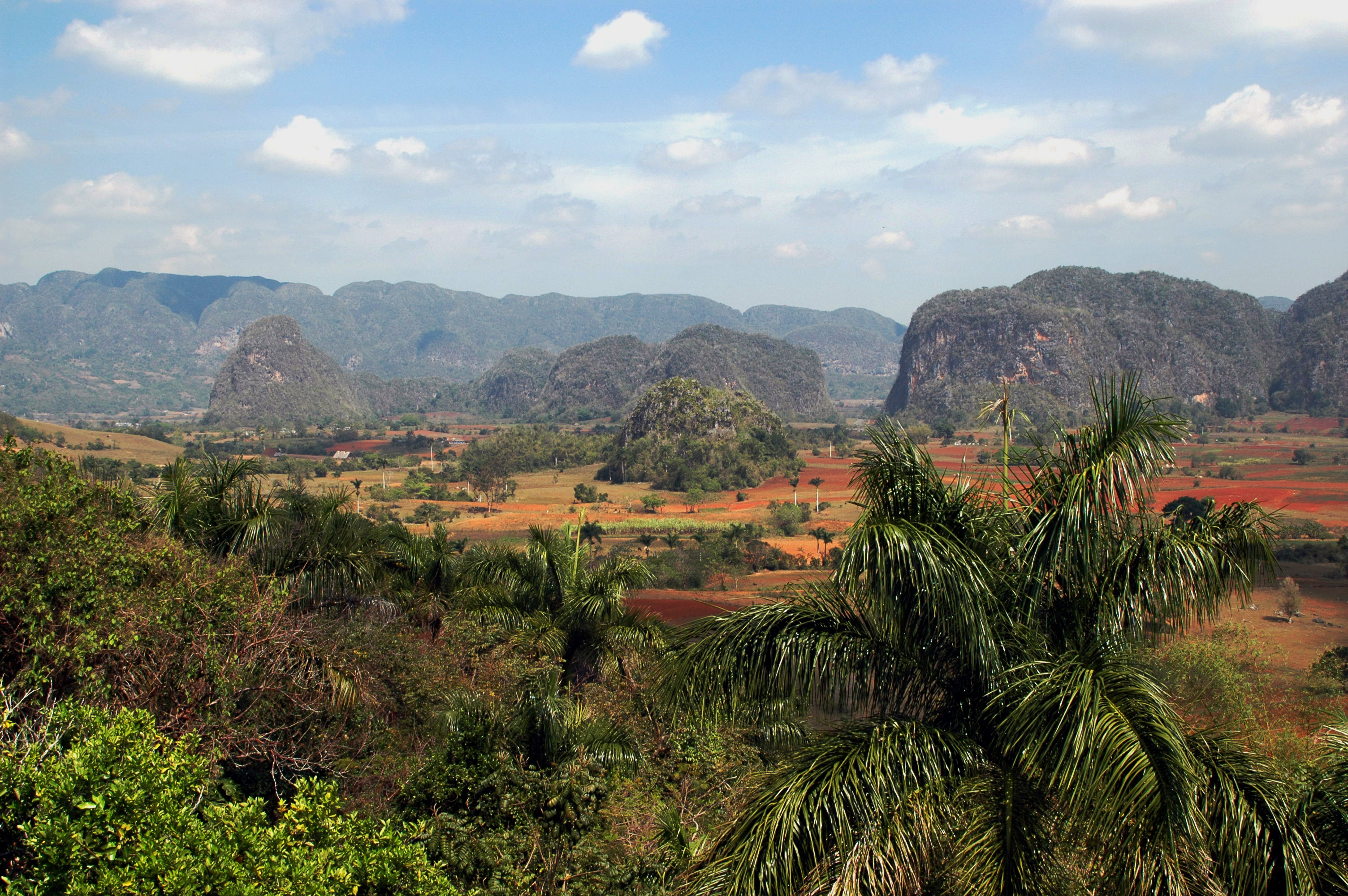
Viñales Valley

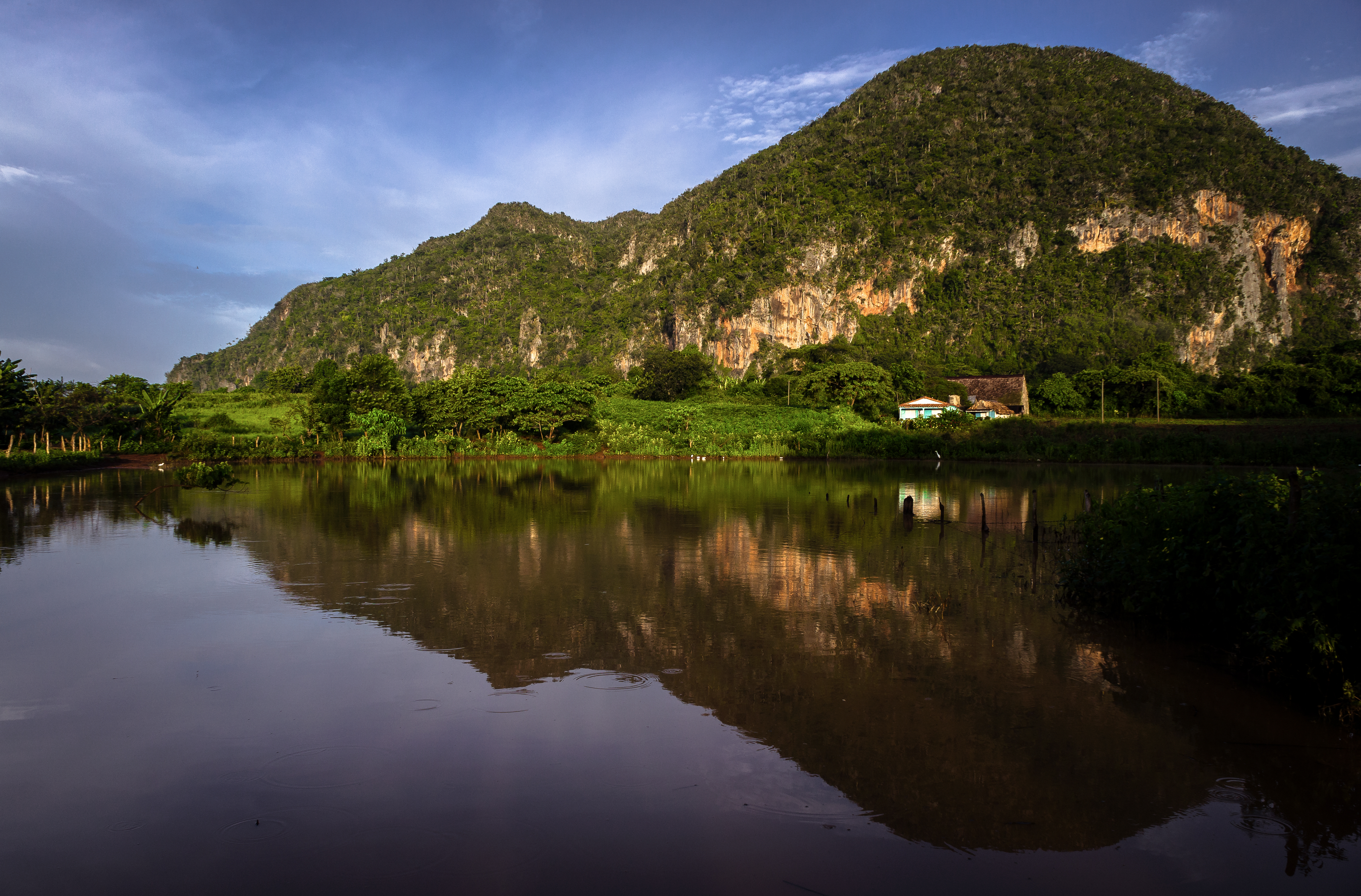
View of lake and Mogote at Viñales

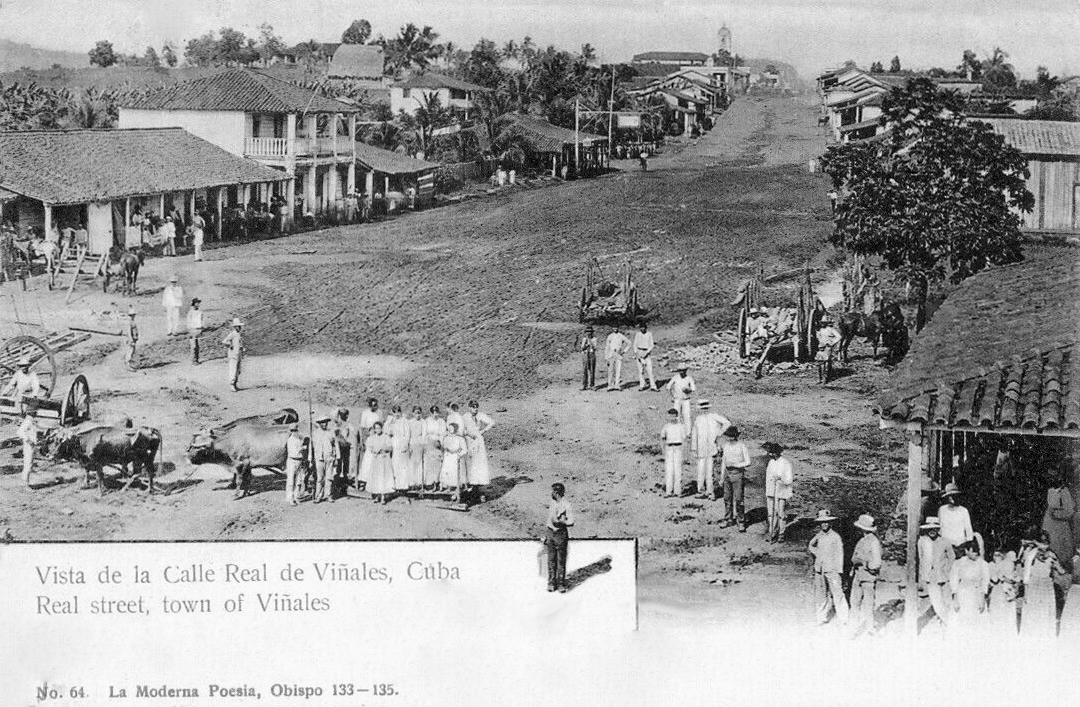
View of the Calle Real in 1902.

== See also ==
- Municipalities of Cuba
- List of cities in Cuba
