= Plaza Centro Mall =

Shopping mall located in Caguas, Puerto Rico

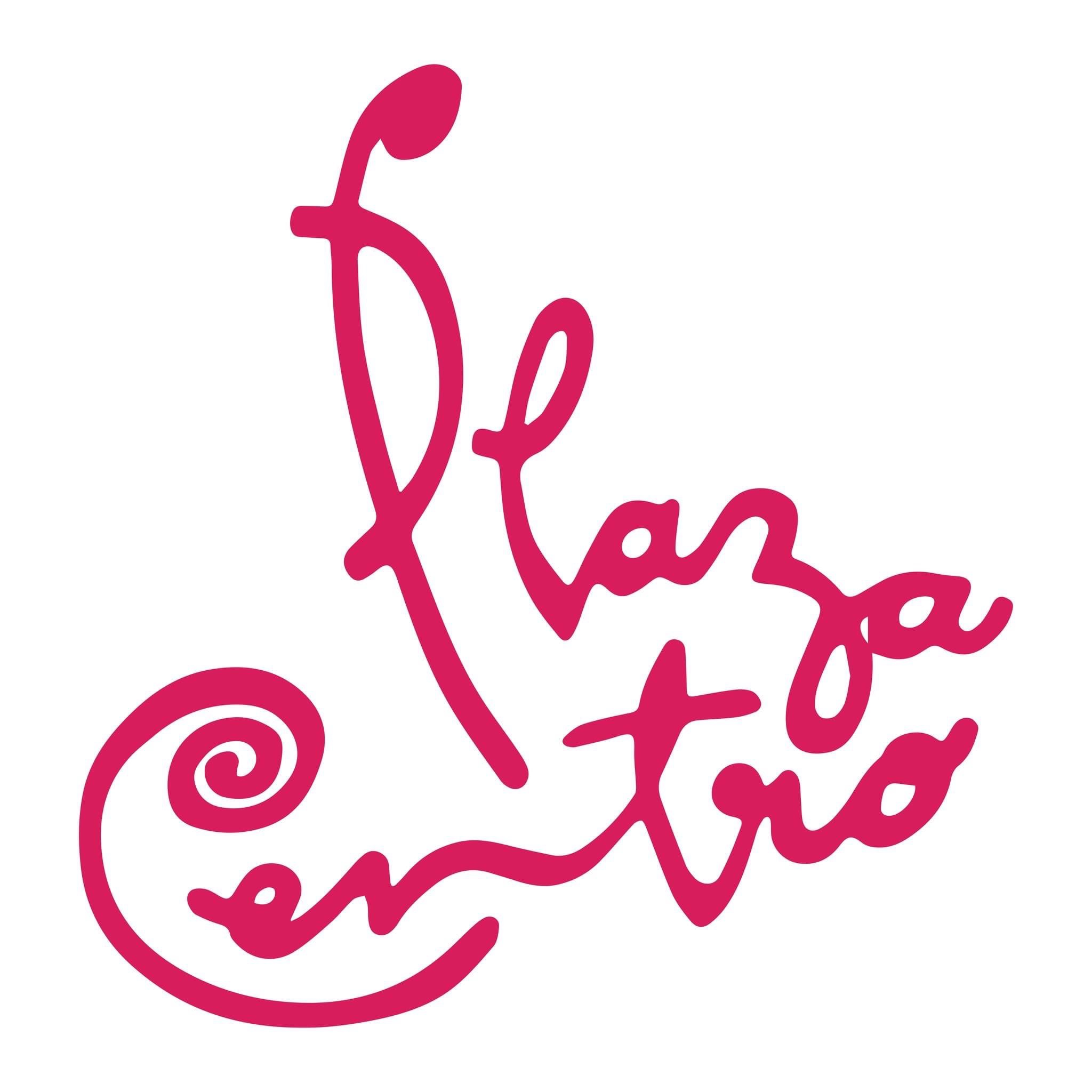
- Location: Caguas, Puerto Rico
- Coordinates: 18°14′52″N 66°1′18″W
- Address: PR-30 & Ave. Rafael Cordero Rt 32, Caguas, PR 00725
- Opened: 1986
- Developer: S.B.S.C.A. Associates
- Owner: Kimco Realty
- Num. of stores: 70+
- Num. of anchor tenants: 5
- Floor area: 980,000 sq ft (91,000 m^{2})
- Floors: 1
- Parking: 4,095
- Website: plazacentro.shopkimco.com

Plaza Centro Mall is an enclosed shopping mall located in Caguas, Puerto Rico. The mall opened in 1986, and is currently anchored by a JCPenney, Sam's Club, Costco, Burlington, and a Ross Dress for Less. It also has other major tenants such as a Party City, OfficeMax, Planet Fitness, Chuck E. Cheese, and a PetSmart. The former Kmart space became a Ross Dress for Less in 2025. The mall is divided in two portions, Plaza Centro I which opened in 1986 as an outdoor shopping center, and Plaza Centro II which opened between 1999 and 2000 as the enclosed mall portion.

== History ==
=== Initial opening: 1980s ===
In 1986, being developed by S.B.S.C.A. Associates, Plaza Centro would open its doors to the public with its main anchors Kmart and a Pueblo Xtra supermarket. This ambitious project would become a reality at a cost of $13 million being financed by Banco Popular de Puerto Rico.

=== Enclosure and success: 1990s-2000s ===
On April 10, 1998, it was reported that JCPenney would be expanding in Puerto Rico, planning to open two stores by 1999. One being in Caguas at the time soon to open Plaza Centro II expansion, and another in Humacao at the Plaza Palma Real shopping center.

On August 17, 2000, it was reported that the 280,000 square foot expansion that connected Plaza Centro I and Plaza Centro II had been inaugurated. The mall, renamed the Plaza Centro Mall, comprised some 980,000 square feet of retail space. Plaza Centro was said to be 95% open by that following month. At the time, the mall was 50% open. Plaza Centro retail stores included Almacenes Plaza, A Toda Moda, Babbages, Back Bay, Bambi, Bora Bora, Celulares Telefónica, Click's, Damasco Christian Store, La Defensa, First Bank, La Gloria, Gravity, Great Dolls & More, Group U.S.A., Humberto Vidal, JCPenney, Journeys, Joyeria Barroto, KB Toys, Kids Spot, Marianne Plus, Mastercuts, Me Salve, Now or Never, Nubes, One Price Clothing, Papillon Group, Parade of Shoes, Perfumania, Puerto Escondido, Rachel's Cards & Gift, Sophia, St. Cinnamon, Tiendas 1-2-3, Vitamin World, and Wetzel's Pretzels. The food court would feature The Hot Potato, KFC, Sbarro, Panda Express, Burger King, El Sandwichon, Quizno's, Taco Bell, Charley's Steakery, Churro Time, and Church's.

On September 14, 2000, it was reported that the Group U.S.A. chain of stores had recently opened its third and largest local store at the Plaza Centro Mall. The 24,000 square foot store featured a bridal salon and had been received very well, according to then local company manager Luciana Cazares.

On October 8, 2000, it was reported New York based RD Management, then owner and operator of various malls in Puerto Rico, had almost fully opened the doors of its latest shopping center, Plaza Centro Mall. The 280,000 square foot mall expansion featured more than 50 retail stores including JCPenney, Sam's Club, Group U.S.A., and a Caribbean Cinemas. Already operating in the mall's food court at the time was The Hot Potato, KFC, Sbarro, Burger King, and Panda Express while Church's, Taco Bell, Charley's Steakery, Churro Time, Quiznos, and El Sandwichon were getting ready to open.

On June 21, 2005, it was reported that Chuck E. Cheese would be opening their second location on the island at the Plaza Centro Mall, the location would be around 13,000 square feet and would employ some 60 people. At the time they were waiting for Pueblo Supermarkets to give up their space and close to make space for the new Chuck E. Cheese.

On January 26, 2006, it was reported that Kimco Realty would be buying shopping malls from RD Management, of these it included the Plaza Centro Mall. If the deal went through, it would represent at the time the largest shopping mall acquisition in Puerto Rico since November 2004, when Ohio-based Developers Diversified Realty had announced the purchase of 15 local shopping malls with almost five million square feet from Caribbean Property Group.

In 2008, Burlington Coat Factory would open a 37,000 square foot store at the Plaza Centro Mall, serving as an anchor and taking up space of the former Pueblo Supermarkets.

On September 17, 2009, it was reported that California based International House of Pancakes (IHOP) was coming back to the local market. Construction was underway on a new IHOP location in Caguas' Plaza Centro at an estimated $1.7 initial investment.

=== 2010s, and on ===
On May 12, 2011, it was reported that PetSmart, the largest U.S. specialty retailer of products and services for pets, would open its fourth store in Puerto Rico in the Plaza Centro Mall with a multimillion-dollar investment. The new PetSmart store also completed Plaza Centro's six month expansion, bringing mall occupancy to its highest level in years at the time. With 980,000 square feet of retail space, more than 100 stores, restaurants and entertainment retailers, Plaza Centro, a Kimco Realty Corp. property, was the island's fourth largest shopping center. The new PetSmart store, was scheduled to open later that week, it would occupy an 18,000 square foot retail space formerly occupied by a Group U.S.A., helping create 30 direct jobs as one of the shopping center's top tenants. Joining PetSmart at Plaza Centro was Liberty Cablevision, which relocated its customer service center to the shopping center. During the shopping center's six month retail expansion, the following tenants had opened: Health 4 Life, Fashion Show District, DirecTV, Caguas Auto mall, restaurants such as La Casita Persa and Chicco Grill, and a renovated Clarks shoe store.

On October 26, 2016, it was reported that local retailer Grand Way would inaugurate a new store at the Plaza Centro Mall on Caguas on October 27, shopping center officials said. The Plaza Centro store would occupy a 10,000 square foot space and would create 35 jobs. Grand Way's inauguration followed other store openings at Plaza Centro Mall including Helados Ico Rico, a local artisanal sherbet kiosk that catered to local taste buds, and others that would open shortly at the time such as Dream's Art, specializing in collectible toys, and Sarah's Palace, a women's clothing store.

On January 29, 2018, it was reported that the Walgreens chain had confirmed the closure of 12 locations around Puerto Rico. This included the location at the Plaza Centro Mall, which had been affected after the Hurricane Maria in 2017.

On December 10, 2019, it was reported that local retailer Me Salvé was making history with the opening of its 101st store, the largest and most emblematic of the company, which had been serving the Puerto Rican people for 37 years. With the opening of the Me Salvé store in the Plaza Centro Mall, 15 to 20 direct jobs and over 50 indirect jobs were created.

On January 12, 2020, it was reported that the Kmart store located in Plaza Centro I, had announced that it would close its doors after over 30+ years of service. At the time, the exact date of the store's closure had not been reported, however liquidation sales would be available starting that week.

On February 18, 2021, it was reported that Plaza Centro I shopping center, owner MJS Caguas Limited Partnership, faced a $24.6 million collection and foreclosure lawsuit from U.S. Bank National Association, filed in the Caguas Superior Court. The lawsuit was correspondent to an outstanding $28 million loan originated by Canadian Imperial Bank of Commerce in January 2011. The loan was payable on monthly installments of $172,400.82 with an annual interest rate of 6.25% According to the legal filing, MJS Caguas stopped making the full monthly installments, pertaining to the outstanding principal and interest, beginning April 2020. In the document, U.S. Bank accuses MJS Caguas of defaulting under the terms of the note and loan agreement. The entire outstanding principal amount of the loan was due on February 1, 2021. U.S. Bank was asking the court to order the sale of the real estate property through public auction, the immediate appointment of a receiver to take possession of and manage, collect rents and other income derived from the property and the termination of the current property management agreement. Plaza Centro I is situated on a plot of land with an area of approximately 26 “cuerdas,” or 102,149 square meters, located in the Bairoa neighborhood of Caguas. It borders Highway 30, going from Caguas to Humacao, and Rafael Cordero Ave. Kimco Realty Corp. owns the adjacent Plaza Centro II retail property which has Costco, Sam's Club and PetSmart among its tenants.

On April 12, 2022, it was reported that BH Properties, a Los Angeles based real estate investment company, had acquired out of foreclosure Plaza Centro I, a 283,454 square foot strip shopping center. The strip center was built as the first phase of the nearly one million square foot Plaza Centro Mall. Renovated in 2017, it was at the time 50 percent occupied by 29 tenants. The adjacent and enclosed second phase, which was not part of the collateral, is anchored by Sam's Club, PetSmart, JCPenney, OfficeMax and Costco.

On May 2, 2024, it was reported that Ross Dress for Less would officially be opening at the Plaza Centro I shopping center portion, taking over the former space of the Kmart store which sat vacant since 2020. Plans for Ross to officially debut on the island are scheduled for the beginning of 2025.

In 2026, the Party City store at Plaza Centro Mall in Caguas closed as part of the company’s consolidation in Puerto Rico.

== Current anchors ==
- JCPenney
- Sam's Club
- Costco
- Burlington
- Ross Dress for Less
- PetSmart
- OfficeMax
- Planet Fitness
- Chili's Grill & Bar
- Chuck E. Cheese

=== Outparcel tenants ===
- Pep Boys
- AutoZone
- Walmart Supercenter
- Longhorn Steakhouse
- Ponderosa Steakhouse

== Former anchors ==
- Kmart
- Pueblo Supermarkets
- Masso
- Walgreens
- Party City
