= List of botanical gardens and arboretums in Puerto Rico =

This list of botanical gardens and arboretums is intended to include all significant botanical gardens and arboretums in the U.S. territory Puerto Rico

Name	Image	Affiliation	City
Institute of Sustainable Biotechnology			Barranquitas
Heliconia Society of Puerto Rico			Carolina
Palmas Botanical Gardens			Humacao
Montoso Gardens			Maricao
Tropical Agricultural Research Station		USDA-ARS	Mayaguez
Arboretum and Casa Maria Gardens			San German
Arboretum Parque Dona Ines			San Juan
San Juan Botanical Garden		University of Puerto Rico	San Juan
William Miranda Marín Botanical and Cultural Garden also known as Botanical and Cultural Garden of Caguas			Caguas

== See also ==
- List of botanical gardens and arboretums in the United States
