= Montoso Gardens =

Farm and plant nursery in Maricao, Puerto Rico

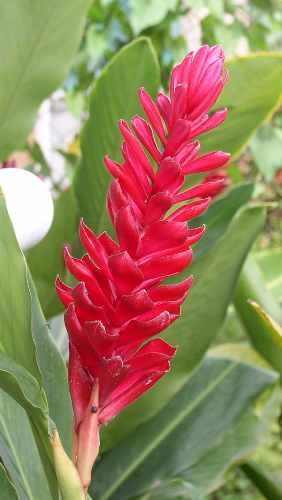
- Alpinia purpurata plant in the Montoso Garden.

- Location within Puerto Rico
- Type: Botanical Garden
- Location: Maricao, Puerto Rico
- Coordinates: 18°7′21.85″N 66°58′28.64″W
- Area: 36 hectares (89 acres)
- Created: 1987
- Website: www.montosogardens.com

Montoso Gardens is a farm and plant nursery dedicated to cultivating plants for local consumption and export. It incorporates a privately owned botanical garden and nature reserve of about 36 hectares (89 acres). Situated in the Maricao region of Puerto Rico, Montoso Gardens holds international recognition as a botanical institution, with the initials of its herbarium being MGMPR.

== Location ==
This botanical garden is located on the southern slope of the Pico Montoso mountain, at 1500 feet (457 m) altitude in the heart of the abrupt coffee region in Maricao, next to the Maricao State Forest of 5000 acres and with 23 species of endemic plants of the 128 existing in Puerto Rico.

Montoso Gardens, Hwy 120 km 18.9, Box 692, Maricao, Puerto Rico, 00606

A donation is charged for the maintenance of the facilities.

== History ==
The previous owner, horticulturist Dr. Frank Martin, had already started a botanical collection, and numerous specimens of plants and trees come from this initial nucleus.

The current owners have been adding plant species since the year 1987, to the present day.

== Collections ==
In the botanical garden it exhibits tropical flora in all its exuberance and variety. One of their primary missions at the Montoso Gardens is the conservation of the various species of tropical plants. There are currently more than 1800 varieties of plants in its collections, representing multiple species and cultivar with over 600 taxa cultivated:

- Endemic species in the area
- Fruit trees; Litchi chinensis, Canarium ovatum, Garcinia mangostana
- Ornamental plants
- Spices, Piper nigrum, Durio zibethinus, Cinnamomum zeylanicum

== See also ==
- List of botanical gardens and arboretums in Puerto Rico
- Powell Gardens
- Salagon Gardens
- Elk Rock Gardens of the Bishop's Close
- Hakone Gardens
