= William Miranda Marín Botanical and Cultural Garden =

Botanical garden, archaeological site and natural reserve in Caguas, Puerto Rico

- Botanical and Cultural Garden of Caguas
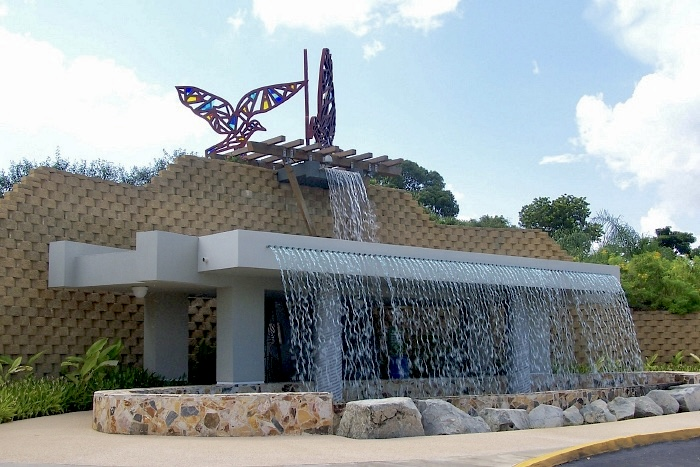
- The entrance to the Garden

- Location within Puerto Rico
- Type: Botanical Garden
- Location: Caguas, Puerto Rico
- Coordinates: 18°14′29″N 66°03′42″W
- Created: March 30, 2007
- Operator: Caguas Sustainable Development Office
- Website: www.jardinbotanicoycultural.org

The William Miranda Marín Botanical and Cultural Garden also known as Botanical and Cultural Garden of Caguas is a botanical garden, archaeological site and natural reserve of about 235,800 m² of extension, which is located in the Cañabón neighborhood, of the autonomous municipality of Caguas, in Puerto Rico.

== Location ==
This botanical garden is located near the main cities of the Island of Puerto Rico, just 30 minutes from San Juan.

Botanical and Cultural Garden of Caguas , Office of Sustainable Development, Autonomous Municipality of Caguas, Puerto Rico. The visiting hours are from Thursday to Sunday from 10:00 am to 4:00 pm.

== History ==
The garden has several additional elements that define it as a multi-themed one since it is not only a botanical garden but also a zoo, historical, ecological and museum site.

Lotus flower in the Jardín Botánico y Cultural William Miranda Marín

The Caguas Botanical and Cultural Garden works both as a nature reserve and as an archaeological area, as it houses historical ruins.

Among the archaeological ruins stand out the old sugar mill known as the "Hacienda San José", also the reconstruction of a barrack of slaves, and important archaeological sites of the Taínos that inhabited in Boriquen, Indigenous name of Puerto Rico, with pieces dating from Pre-Columbian era to the times of Spanish colonization.

This space contains part of all the Cagüeños and Puerto Ricans, as the essences of the Taínos, blacks and Spanish are added in its texture, the garden celebrates criollismo, the sum of the three races, in several of its educational areas.

== Collections ==
In the botanical garden it exhibits tropical flora in all its exuberance and variety. At the same time it houses the fauna of this vegetation. Vegetable exhibits are arranged in the following areas:

- Arboretum with sections of,
  - The Heritage Forest displays 36 species of native and endemic trees that were of great ecological, nutritional and practical importance to the island's ancestors.
  - La Arboleda Ancestral Taína celebrates the indigenous heritage of the Creole through a monumental public art project inspired by the indigenous bateyes.
  - The African Ancestral Grove is a space of tribute, remembrance and respect for our African ancestors, which includes a bronze monument, representing the figure of Osaín.
  - The Grove of Consciousness is a call to reflection on the importance of protecting our natural resources, presenting various species of trees threatened with extinction.
  - La Arboleda Florida is a colorful festival that allows us to enjoy 40 species of trees with showy flowers.
  - The plantation of the "Palo de Pollo", the Pollales (forests of "Palo de Pollo" ( Pterocarpus officinalis) in Puerto Rico are impressive groves that form in places very humid such as swamps. In the garden there is a planting of these trees that inhabit the banks of the Caguitas River.
  - La Arboleda Criolla explores the uses of 15 species of Cagüeño trees that produce wood of commercial importance during the 19th and 20th centuries.
- La Huerta Frutal exhibits 50 species of native and foreign fruit trees that have been part of the recipe book of Puerto Rican cuisine.
- The Casa Jíbara y Siembra Agrícola Familiar honors the peasant grandparents of Puerto Rico. This area offers the recreation of a family plantation or "felling" accomplished with traditional techniques and an exhibition hall.
- The Planting of the Puerto Rican Artisan celebrates the creativity of the Puerto Rican people in carving, along with 60 species of trees, herbs and vines that enhance them.
- El Palmar exhibits dozens of species of palms from different parts of the world distributed by their geographical areas of origin.
- El Bambular, which originates in the Plaza Agrícola and borders the Caguitas River, is a collection of different species of bamboos.
- La Manigua is a Taino expression to designate a tropical wetland ecosystem characterized by water-saturated soils and vegetation adapted to the lack of oxygen in the soil.
- The River Corridor is a planting plan aimed at stimulating the natural process of regeneration of the vegetation adjacent to the Caguitas River that connects with the "Honor to the River" project.
- The Aquatic Plants and Tropical Fish Garden occupies a space within the historic area of the old hacienda house, with a pond for growing aquatic plants and a hatchery for tropical fish.
- The Plaza Agrícola Urbana is made up of six warehouses for crop production hydroponics, and the propagation of practical plants.
- The Butterfly is a space in the historic area dedicated to the breeding and spread of butterflies.

Educational tours, trail hikes, publications and special activities are provided in all of these sections. It is a unique place to attend and have healthy fun and comprehensive learning.

== Gallery ==
Sites at the garden and cultural center

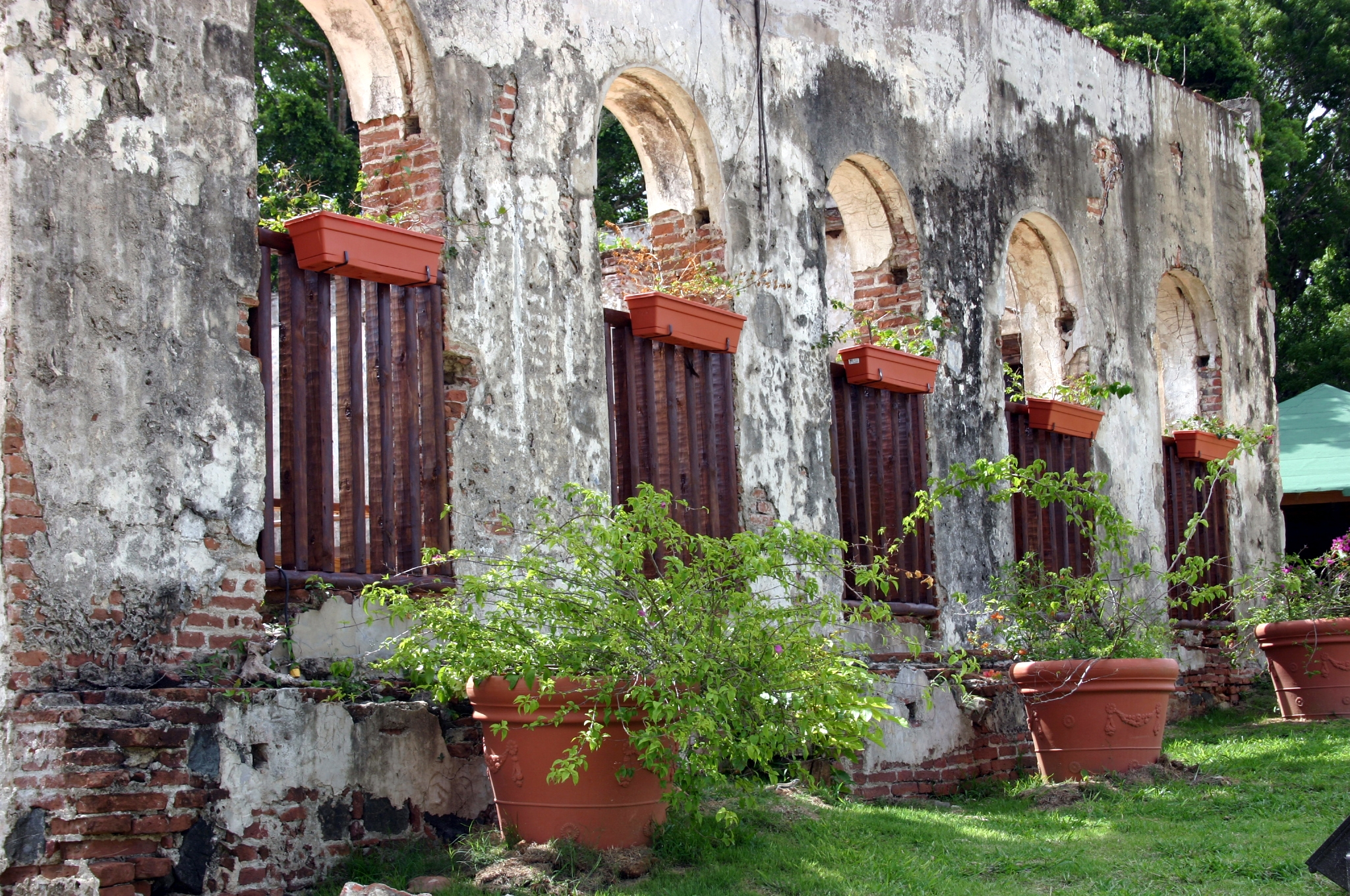
Ruins

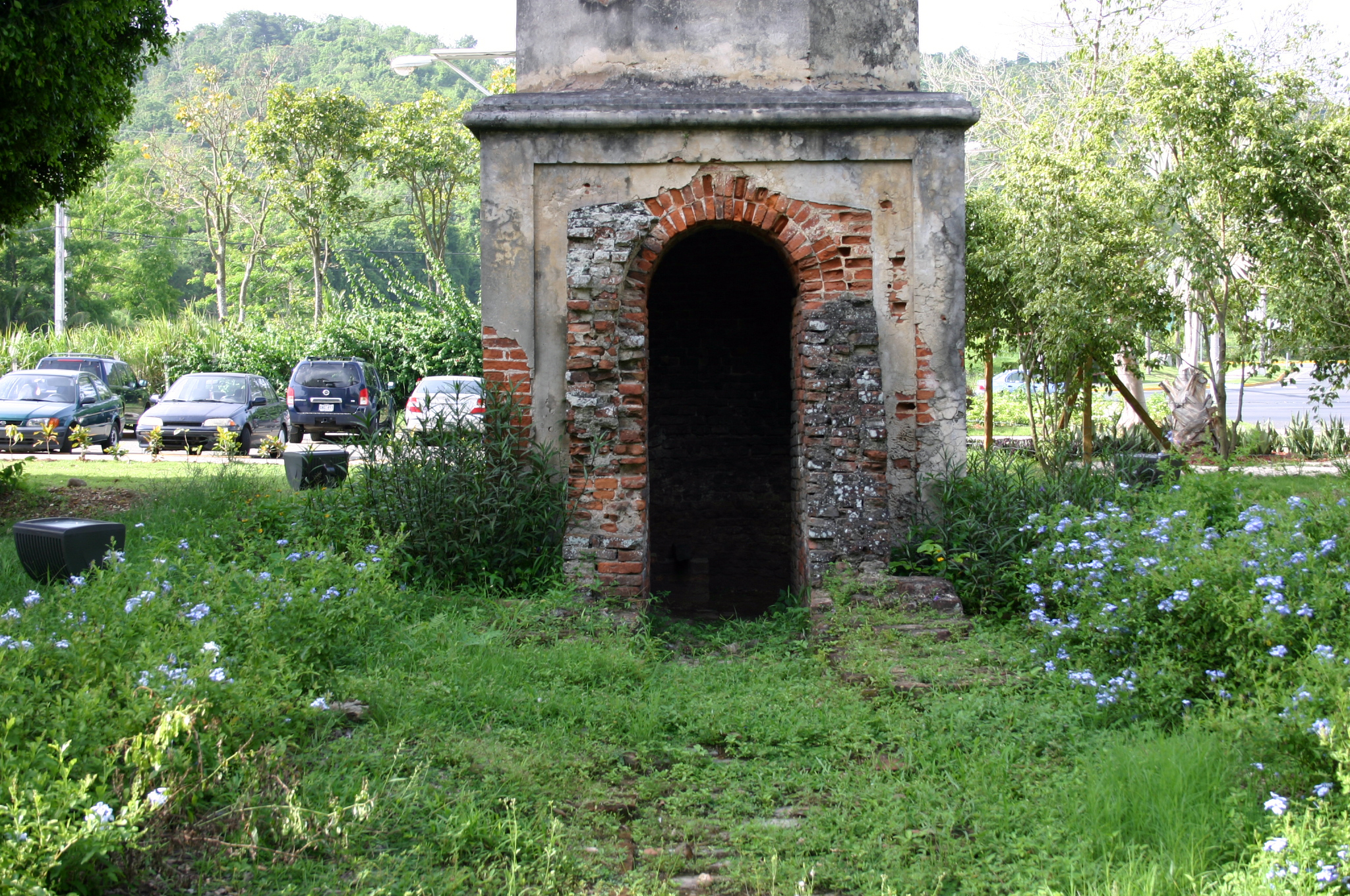
Chimney

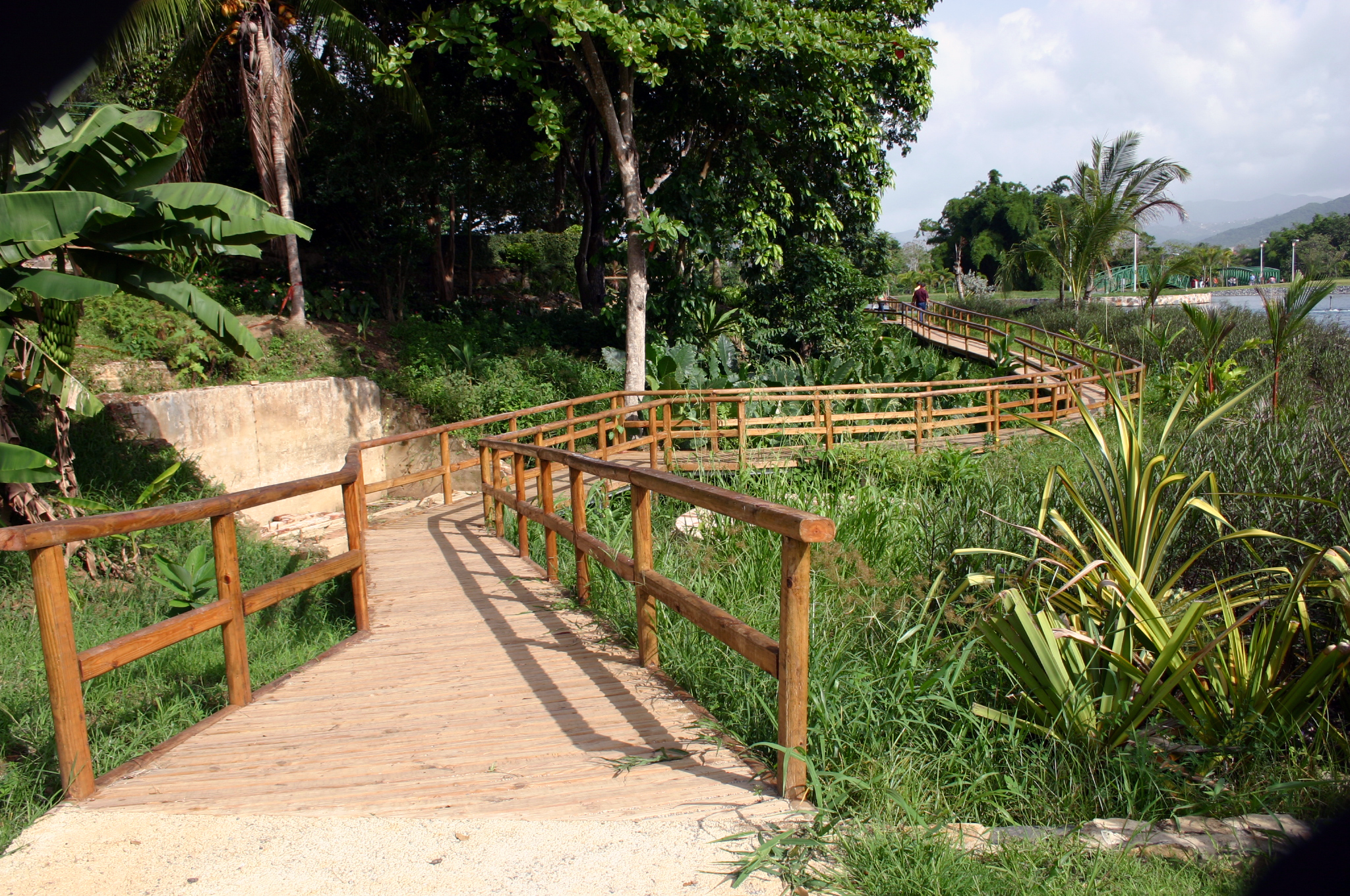
Boardwalk

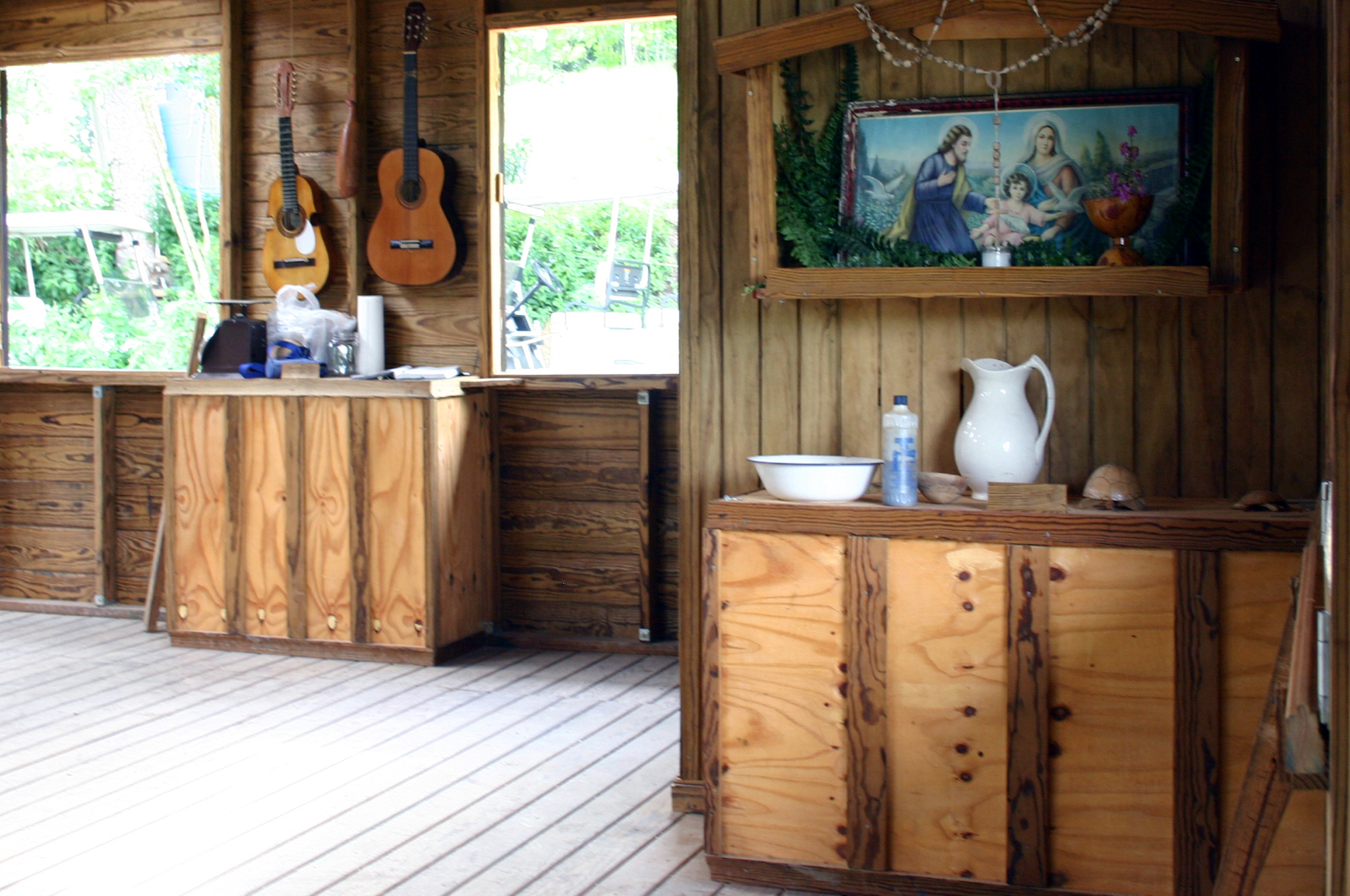
Peasant's exhibit

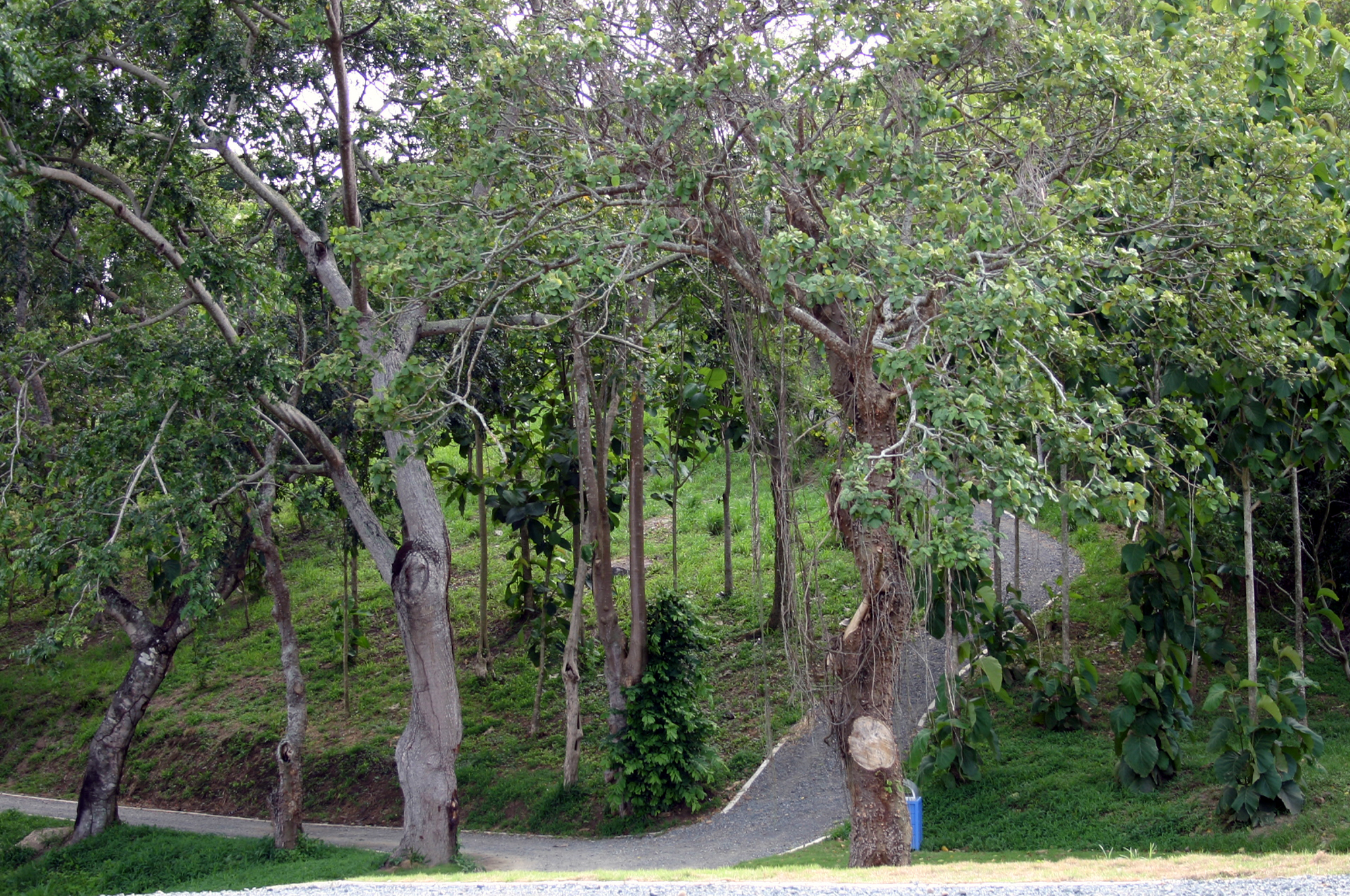
Trails

== See also ==
- List of botanical gardens and arboretums in Puerto Rico
