= Cañaboncito River =

River of Puerto Rico

Coordinates: 18.2335663°N 66.0565545°W

- Native name: Río Cañaboncito (Spanish)

Location
- Commonwealth: Puerto Rico
- Municipality: Caguas

Physical characteristics
- Source
  - location: Sector La Comarca in Cañaboncito
- Mouth
  - location: Cagüitas River in Cañaboncito, Caguas
  - elevation: 226 ft.

The Cañaboncito River (Spanish: Río Cañaboncito) is a tributary of the Cagüitas River that flows through the municipality of Caguas, Puerto Rico. It gives the barrio Cañaboncito its name, which it crosses from southwest to northeast before emptying into the Cagüitas River.

== See also ==
- List of rivers of Puerto Rico
