= Viñales Municipal Museum =

Museum in Cuba

- Museo Municipal de Viñales
- Established: 18 March 1982
- Location: Viñales, Cuba

Viñales Municipal Museum is a museum located in the Salvador Cisneros street in Viñales, Cuba. It was established as museum on 18 March 1982.

== See also ==
- List of museums in Cuba
