= Cueva del Indio =

Cueva del Indio may refer to:

- Cueva del Indio (Las Piedras), a cave located in Las Piedras, Puerto Rico
- Cueva del Indio (Arecibo), a cave located in Arecibo, Puerto Rico

== See also ==
- Cueva de Los Indios, Loiza, Puerto Rico
