= Genesco =

American footwear importer and retailer manager

Coordinates: 36°6′47.4″N 86°41′32.2″W

Genesco Inc.
- Type: Public
- Traded as: NYSE: GCO
- Industry: Shoes, apparel
- Predecessor: Jarman Shoe Company; General Shoe Corporation
- Founded: 1924; 102 years ago (as Jarman Shoe Company)
- Founders: James Franklin Jarman; William Hatch Wemyss
- Headquarters: Nashville, Tennessee, U.S.
- Number of locations: 1,250
- Area served: Worldwide
- Key people: Mimi E. Vaughn (President, CEO and Board Chair); Scott E. Becker (Senior Vice President, General Counsel and Corporate Secretary)
- Products: Footwear, accessories
- Revenue: ▼US$2.38 billion (2023)
- Operating income: ▼US$93.2 million (2023)
- Net income: ▼US$71.9 million (2023)
- Total assets: ▼US$1.46 billion (2023)
- Total equity: ▲US$607 million (2023)
- Number of employees: c. 19,000 (2023)
- Subsidiaries: Dockers Footwear; Johnston & Murphy; Journeys; Journeys Kidz; Little Burgundy; Schuh
- Website: www.genesco.com

Genesco Inc. is an American publicly owned specialty retailer and wholesaler of branded and licensed footwear and accessories. Its brands include Dockers, Johnston & Murphy, Journeys, and Schuh.

The company was founded in 1924 as Jarman Shoe Company, and is based in Nashville, Tennessee.

== Company history ==
Aerial image of the General Shoe Corporation in 1939.

James Franklin Jarman, J.H. Lawson and William Hatch Wemyss, all former salesmen for Carter Shoe Co. in Nashville, founded Jarman Shoe Company in 1924 as a footwear manufacturer. The company grew rapidly and took the name General Shoe Corporation in 1933, and its initial public stock offering took place in 1939.

By the 1950s, General Shoe had factories in many southern towns, especially in Genesco's home state of Tennessee. The company assumed its current name, Genesco, in 1959, two years after it was chosen as one of the stocks in the first S&P 500 Index. Earlier strictly a manufacturer of footwear, W. Maxey Jarman, the ambitious son of co-founder J.F. Jarman, led the company to slowly diversify, especially as more of the manufacturing was being conducted overseas; as well, it entered into fields such as sports—at one-time manufacturing and selling football (soccer) balls—and retail ownership, including the New York department store Bonwit Teller and the five-and-dime store S. H. Kress & Co.

In 1973, directors of Genesco, who had oveseen W. Maxey Jarmen's subsequent naming of his son (J.F. Jarman's grandson), Franklin M. Jarman, as board chairman, then "quelled a dispute within the family at its top management" and elected the younger Jarman, then 42‐years‐old, to the further position of company CEO, essentially replacing his father. By 1977, Genesco would go on to add ownership of Henri Bendel and Flagg Bros. shoe stores, to its Jarman's Shoes and Bonwit Teller. On January 2, 1977, the ten sitting directors of Genesco voted unanimously to oust the young Franklin M. Jarman from his positions of president and chief executive officer, retaining him as board chairman, but only with duties and authority as allowed him by the interim CEO, William M. Blackie, with a committee of the board tasked with identifying a permanent CEO.

The company suffered from over-diversification at one point, and the ongoing manufacturing operations in the southern United States continued to depress results for a long period of time.

In February 2002, Genesco Chief Executive Ben Harris, noting that "[s]ales of welted shoes ha[d] fallen as consumers... adopted more casual attire"', said that demand for that product "ha[d] reached a level at which it can be better satisfied from other sources", and—despite previous year company statements "sternly reject[ing]" closure of the Johnston & Murphy, Nashville, Tennessee plant—and announced a layoff of 40 workers, and closure of the plant. Hence, Genesco exited the business of U.S.-based shoe manufacturing in 2002, and in that year began contracting with independent, third parties located offshore, to manufacture its branded and licensed footwear.

In June 2011, Genesco acquired U.K. retail chain and web business Schuh.

== Brands ==
The following is a list of some brands and retailers owned or licensed by Genesco as of 2006:

- Johnston & Murphy – Retailer of men's and women's footwear, apparel, luggage and leather goods sold in Genesco-owned Johnston & Murphy retail stores, and wholesaler of footwear to department and specialty stores.
- Dockers Footwear – Casual footwear marketed with the Dockers brand licensed from Levi Strauss & Co. and sold at wholesale to department and specialty stores
- Journeys – Retailer of footwear for teens and young adults. The first Journeys retail store was opened at the Rivergate Mall in Nashville, Tennessee by Genesco in December 1986.
- Journeys Kidz – Retailer of footwear for children, where many of the Journeys brands and styles can be found in smaller sizes in the Journeys Kidz stores.
- Schuh – U.K. retailer of footwear and other branded items, acquired by Genesco in June 2011.
- Little Burgundy – Montreal, Canada-based footwear retailer for trendy teens and young adults, acquired by Genesco in 2015.
