= Tropical Agricultural Research Station =

USDA-ARS agricultural research center in Mayagüez, Puerto Rico

USDA-ARS Tropical Agriculture Research Station
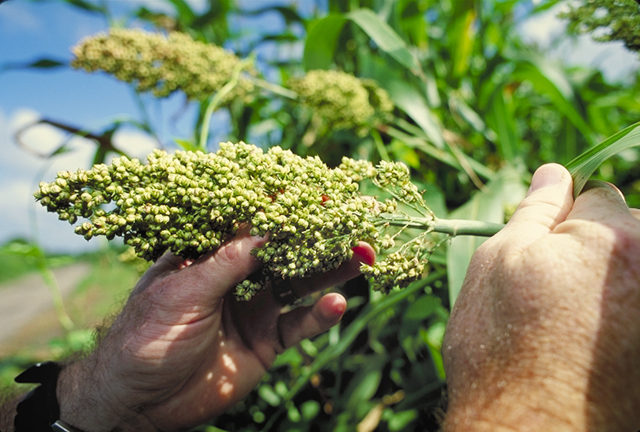
- A specimen of cultivar of sorghum.

- Location within Puerto Rico
- Type: Botanical Garden
- Location: Mayagüez, Puerto Rico
- Coordinates: 18.2079°N 67.1383°W
- Created: 1901
- Website: www.ars.usda.gov/southeast-area/mayaguez-pr/tropical-crops-and-germplasm-research/docs/main/

USDA-ARS Tropical Agriculture Research Station or TARS is an USDA-ARS agricultural research center with well known botanical garden in the city of Mayagüez, in Puerto Rico. Maricao, in Puerto Rico. Its code of international recognition as a botanical institution, as well as the initials of its herbarium is MAYAG.

== Location ==
This botanical garden is located at Pedro Albizu Campos Ave. Suite 201 Mayagüez 00680, between Carr. 65 intersection with Carr. 108. Tropical Agricultural Research Station Mayagüez Institute of Tropical Agriculture, PO Box 70, Autonomous Municipality of Mayagüez, PR 00708, Puerto Rico. Office hours to arrange a visit of the TARS are from 7:00 am – 12:00 pm / 1:00 pm – 4:00 pm.

== History ==
In 1901, the United States Congress authorized the establishment of the research station in Mayagüez to study agricultural problems of interest to Puerto Rico. One hundred years later, the station makes important contributions to agriculture on a regional and national scale.

According to Ricardo J. Goenaga, the director of the TARS, the main goal of the scientists at the station is the development of fruit production systems that help growers to increase the market and the sales potential of the crops.

The Germplasm Research and Introduction Unit in Saint Croix, of the United States Virgin Islands, is a satellite site of the Mayagüez station. This facility is also part of the National Plant Germplasm System (NPGS]) of the ARS. The new germplasm is grown here in isolation and is certified free of harmful pathogens before it is distributed for home use.

== Collections ==
Currently, the TARS contains one of the best and well-documented tropical plant collections in the Western Hemisphere, consisting of more than 2,000 permanently cultivated species, both tropical fruits and ornamental plants.

TARS research also focuses on improving genetic diversity in dry greens and sorghum.

== Activities ==
Currently the "TARS" is developing the projects:

- Quick and easy method to identify the susceptibility and resistance of sorghum to ergotism.
- Selection of germplasm from green bean with heat tolerance and disease resistance of common bacterial infection.
- Selection of clones of cocoa that produce high yields of their crops.
- Determination of the water that guineo and papaya need to grow in various types of soil.
- New crops of fruit varieties of plantains, papayas and other tropical fruits.

== See also ==
- List of botanical gardens and arboretums in Puerto Rico
