= Johnston & Murphy =

American clothing company

- A Johnston & Murphy storefront at West Town Mall
- Type: Subsidiary
- Industry: Apparel
- Predecessor: William J. Dudley Shoe Company, The James Johnston Company
- Founded: Newark, New Jersey, US (1850)
- Founder: William J. Dudley, James Johnston, William A. Murphy
- Headquarters: Nashville, Tennessee, US
- Number of locations: 158
- Products: Shoes, Apparel, Leather goods, Luggage
- Revenue: ▲US$314,759,000 (2023)
- Operating income: ▲US$14,364,000 (2023)
- Total assets: ▲US$194,417,000 (2023)
- Parent: Genesco (1951–present)
- Divisions: Retail Operations, Wholesale
- Website: www.johnstonmurphy.com

Johnston & Murphy is an American footwear and clothing company based in Nashville, Tennessee. Johnston & Murphy designs, sources, markets and distributes footwear, apparel, leather goods and luggage. A subsidiary of Genesco, the Johnston & Murphy Group operates retail and wholesale businesses.

== History ==
Johnston & Murphy traces its roots to the William J. Dudley Shoe Company, founded in 1850 in Newark, New Jersey, by William J. Dudley, a European immigrant and master craftsman who had been schooled in the classic tradition of English shoemaking. The William J. Dudley Shoe Company specialized in quality, highly durable work shoes for men, women and children. During its first 25 years, the company's growth forced five moves to increasingly larger locations. The Factory was originally located in a three-story structure on Market Street, near Lawrence Street, close to Pennsylvania Station. It has been noted by the late historian William Starr Myers that Charles Goodyear, inventor of the Goodyear welt, was a frequent visitor of Dudley's, conferring into the night with Dudley.

In 1880, Newark businessman James Johnston joined the company as Dudley's partner. Johnston's vision was to expand product lines and distribution channels. The company took the durability of its work shoes and built that into a line of higher-fashion footwear, which quickly became popular. In 1881, founder William Dudley died, and Johnston assumed control of the company under a new name, The James Johnston Company. A Manufacturing Journal Published in 1887, however, indicates W.H. Dudley was succeeded in 1879 by James Johnston.

In 1882, William A. Murphy, another prominent Newark businessman from a distinguished family, was intrigued by the success of Johnston's local shoe company. A partnership was formed and the company became known as Johnston & Murphy. By 1887, Johnston & Murphy was producing over two thousand pairs of shoes and slippers weekly in a seven-story factory with 250 operators and steam-driven equipment. In 1892, the firm occupied a newly built factory on 46 to 54 Lincoln Street in the Springfield Belmont Section of Newark, between Mercer and Court Streets. This factory was later expanded to nearly twice its size in 1925.

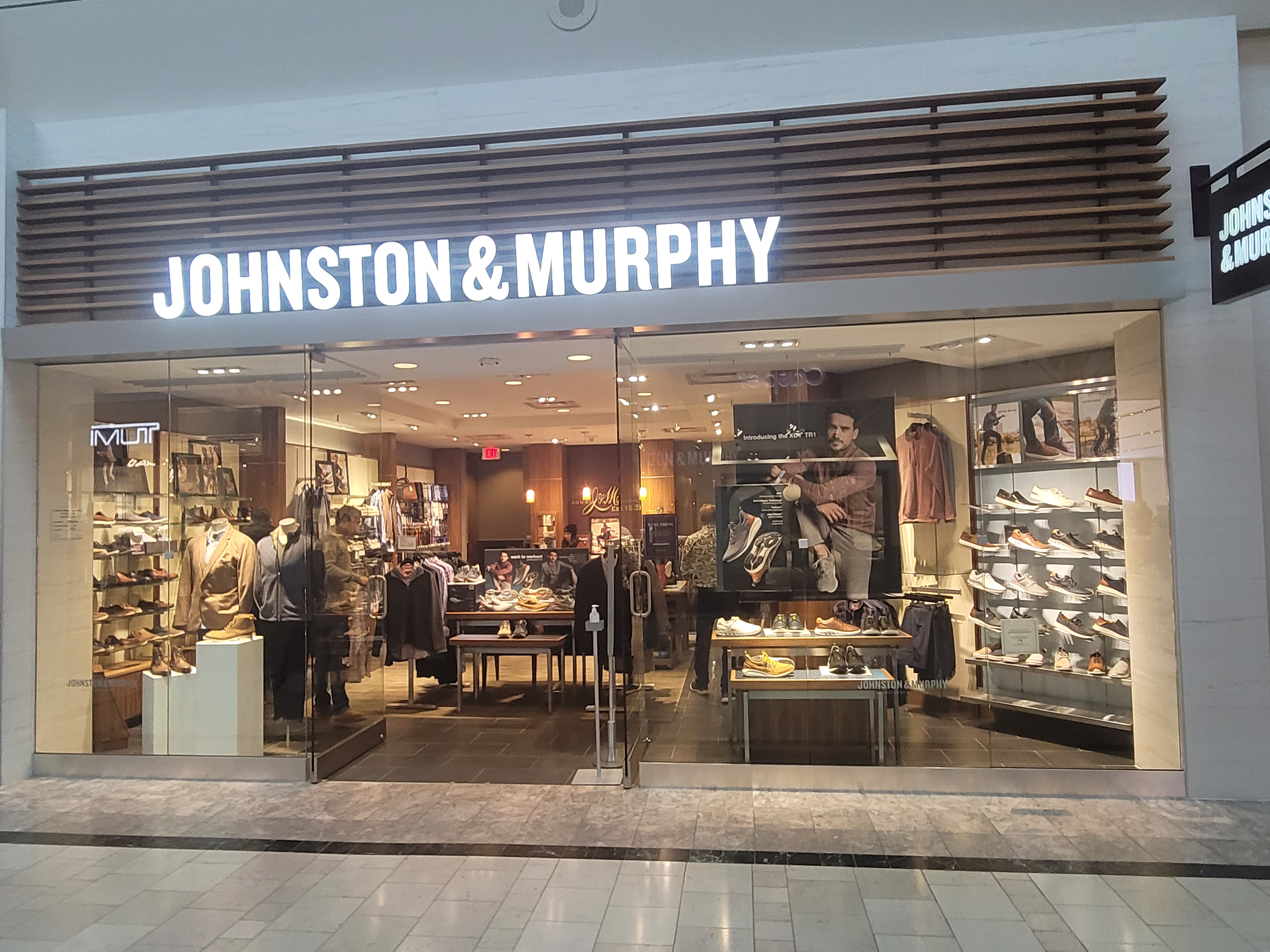
A Johnston & Murphy storefront at Bridgewater Commons mall

In 1895, Murphy sold his interest in the company to Herbert P. Gleason, a former top salesman of the company. Gleason knew the value of a recognized brand name and decided to keep the Johnston & Murphy name as well as establish a national sales and marketing force. James Johnston died in 1903. In the 1920s, Gleason's son, George Gleason, coined the company's first slogan, "The best shoes anybody can buy." He also developed a series of "handsome lifestyle" advertisements and ran campaigns in high-profile magazines such as Vanity Fair and The Saturday Evening Post. Ads featured the Country Club Series, a line of golf shoes, which became one of Johnston & Murphy's most popular.

Genesco (then General Shoe Corporation) purchased Johnston & Murphy in 1951. Genesco closed Johnston & Murphy's Newark, New Jersey, location and moved the operations to Genesco's headquarters city of Nashville, Tennessee.

In 1971, Johnston & Murphy opened its first retail shop in Schaumburg, Illinois. Johnston & Murphy then expanded its retail operations in specialty shops and department stores nationwide and in 1983, the company opened the first Johnston & Murphy Factory Store in Clearwater, Florida. In the '80s, Johnston & Murphy also launched its direct mail catalog featuring men's footwear. In 1996, Johnston & Murphy started opening stores in busy airports, train stations and on prominent streets to better reach professional men on the go.

In 2017, Johnston & Murphy stopped making shoes in the US.

== Operations ==
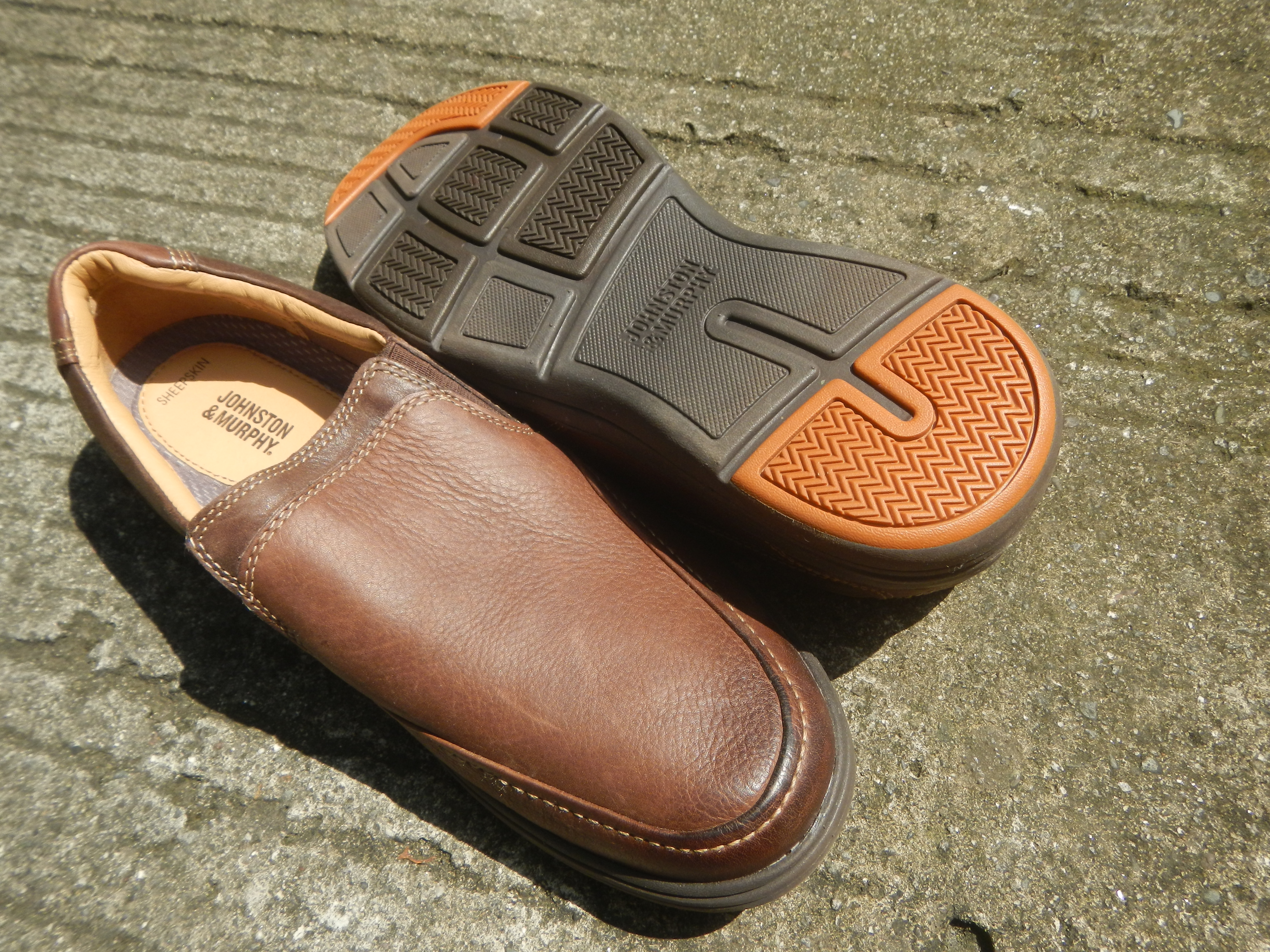
A pair of Johnston & Murphy shoes

In 1850, United States president Millard Fillmore requested founder William J. Dudley to make custom-designed footwear. Johnston & Murphy has designed the shoes of every subsequent president. Ahead of the second inauguration of Donald Trump, Johnston & Murphy exhibited its collection of presidential footwear at the Mayflower Hotel in Washington, D.C.

In 1996, Johnston & Murphy launched its official website. In 1998, Johnston & Murphy opened a flagship on the corner of Madison and 54th Street in New York City and started signing licensing agreements for collections of belts, hosiery, shoe care products, leather outerwear and small leather goods. The company has since expanded the men's line to include business cases and luggage. Johnston & Murphy introduced a new line of women’s footwear, leather goods, accessories and outerwear in the fall of 2008.

Johnston & Murphy's Retail Operations division operates 160 company owned stores and sells products via direct mail catalogs and via the company's web site. The Wholesale division sells Johnston & Murphy branded shoes to more than 2,100 premier department and specialty stores, direct mail and on its web site.

Johnston & Murphy branded products are manufactured by independent, third-party contractors.

In November 2010, to highlight a new line of Johnston & Murphy men’s comfort shoes, the XC4 collection, the brand asked consumers, by way of juxtaposition, for their most uncomfortable moments in their online Ultimate Comfort Contest. The letters in XC4 are meant to stand for “extreme comfort,” while the number alludes to four aspects of the shoes: they are moisture-wicking, light weight, have additional cushioning and include an extra removable insole to ensure proper fit. XC4 styles are available in dress casual and casual styles – representative of Johnston & Murphy's shift to offering more casual footwear in addition to traditional dress shoes. Horween Leather Company in Chicago supplies leather shells for footwear to Johnston & Murphy.

== See also ==
- Alden Shoe Company
- Allen Edmonds
