= Schuh =

Footwear retailer

schuh Ltd.
- Trade name: schuh
- Type: Private
- Industry: Retail
- Founded: Monday 02 November 1981
- Founder: Sandy Alexander
- Headquarters: Livingston, West Lothian, Scotland, UK
- Number of locations: 109 stores (2026)
- Key people: Colin Temple, David Gillan-Reid, Neil Partington, Nicola Monachello
- Products: Footwear
- Number of employees: 4,000+ (12345)
- Parent: Genesco (2011–present) A. Goldberg and Sons LTD (1987-1990)
- Website: www.schuh.co.uk

schuh (/ʃuː/ SHOO) is a footwear retailer based in Livingston, West Lothian, Scotland. As of August 2026, schuh was operating with 109 stores in the United Kingdom and Ireland. The company is predominantly a branded shoe stockist, selling over 80 brands, including: Converse, Vans, UGG, Nike, Adidas as well as its own schuh label.

== History ==
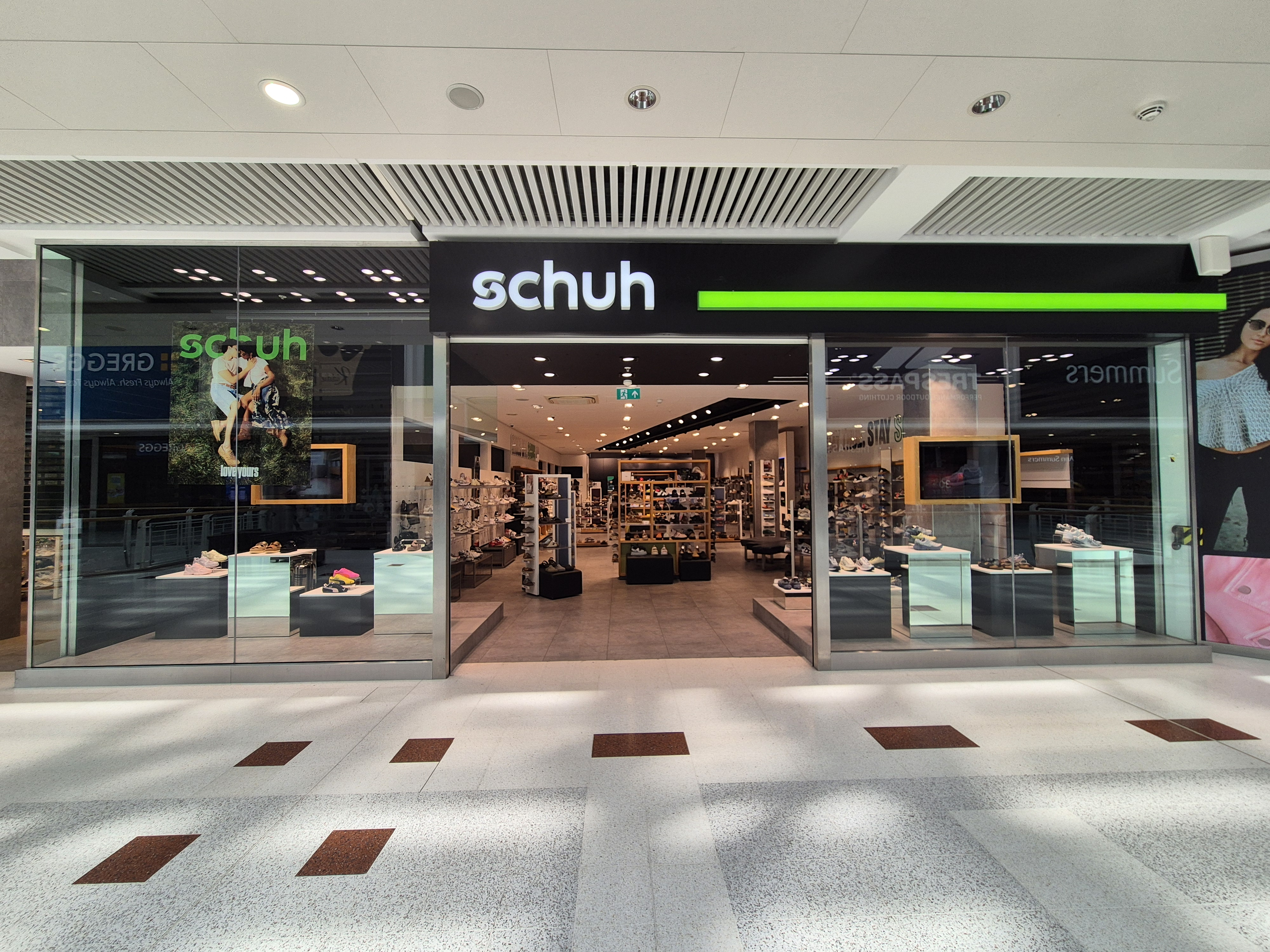
A branch of schuh from Braehead, Scotland.

=== Founding years (1981–1986) ===
The very first schuh store opened in Edinburgh at 9 North Bridge Arcade on Monday 02 November 1981 (a later unit would open at 32 North Bridge itself from 1983 - 2013).

schuh's founder Sandy Alexander noticed a lack of fashionable footwear retailer outside London, and he chose Edinburgh to open the very first schuh store.

During this time schuh opened stores in Edinburgh, Glasgow, Newcastle and Aberdeen.

=== Goldberg years (1987–1990) ===
schuh as a business operated independently until 1987, when the company and the four operating branches were acquired by Goldberg (also known as 'A. Goldberg & Sons', or 'Goldbergs').

It continued as a semi-autonomous trading division and was operated on a concession basis within branches of the Goldberg brands Wrygges and Wrygges Man, News and 'ing' and within Goldberg department stores across Scotland and in Blackpool, England. schuh also opened a number of standalone stores, reaching a total of 52 locations over the three years under the new parent company.

When Goldberg went into administration in 1990, the company regained full independence through a management buy-out and schuh Ltd. was formed.

=== schuh: Clothing for Feet - Expansion Years (1990-2011) ===
schuh embarked on two decades of controlled expansion. By the end of the 1990s there were over 20 stores.

Concession deals were struck with d2 Jeans, Republic and Tempest (Menarys) as well a short lived franchise operation in Dubai, United Arab Emirates.

In 2011, schuh celebrated a landmark 30th anniversary with the tagline '30 Years of Self Expression'. This featured a year-long series of events in cities and stores across the UK and Ireland and included collaborations with several footwear brands.

=== Genesco Years (2011–present) ===
In June 2011, schuh was acquired by Genesco footwear retailer, for the sum of £125 million.

schuh | kids was created in 2012 and saw small areas in company branches selling children's footwear. Several standalone schuh | kids locations opened across the UK.

Over 2015 and 2016, schuh opened three stores in Germany. These closed in the years following the decision of the UK to leave the European Union.

As of August 2026, schuh was operating 109 branches in the UK and Ireland consisting of 92 standalone locations and 17 schuh | kids stores.

== Company name ==
schuh is German for shoe. In external marketing, the company pronounces the word like the English word "shoe". Due to the name, many people assume that schuh is a German company. schuh was to be originally named Lizard, until founder Sandy Alexander's colleague Mike Doherty saw the word ‘schuhe’ written at the top of an industry magazine - they dropped the 'e' and "schuh" was born.

== Company information ==
schuh HQ and distribution centre is in Livingston, Scotland with a Press Office and design studio in London. There are additional distribution centres and warehouses in England and Ireland.

schuh trades profitably from their 100+ high street stores and their website. schuh had a turnover of £233 million in 2012/2013 generating a profit of £25.6 million.

The company has a website with an emphasis on "mobile first approach".

== schuh | kids ==
2012 saw the launch of schuh | kids: the first expansion of the schuh brand since the company was acquired by Genesco in June 2011. Previously schuh had sold a limited range of junior sized footwear in branches and online.

Since launch, the schuh | kids store concept has proved extremely popular, receiving industry recognition with a POPAI interiors award in 2013. schuh | kids is now available in all stores as well as online.

== Products ==
schuh is predominantly a branded footwear stockist selling popular brands like Converse, Adidas, Vans, Nike and UGG Australia as well as less known and more niche brands, and also the schuh own brand label which are designed by an in-house team of shoe designers. The schuh brand aspires to represent current fashion looks and trends. Besides footwear schuh also stocks shoe care products and accessories including bags, hats and sunglasses.

== Initiatives ==
=== the schuh trust ===
Founded in 2011, with proceeds from when schuh was brought into the Genesco family, the schuh trust is used to offer charitable donations and grants to deserving cases, many of which are suggested and supported by the people who work for schuh.

In 2020, the schuh trust donated £3 million to the relief effort during the Covid-19 pandemic.

=== the schuh Club ===
in 2022, schuh launched 'the schuh Club' offering members the opportunity to earn points as they shop. Customers can sign up online and instore.

=== Recycling partnerships ===
schuh offers two in branch schemes for recycling shoes. The Sell Your Soles and Too Big For Your Boots initiatives offer customers a chance to trade in unwanted, worn footwear for a £5 voucher.

=== Vintage Threads ===
In 2024, schuh partnered with Vintage Threads, a London-based reworking clothing brand, to transform pre-loved footwear into wearable fashion items. The collection toured some of the larger branches of schuh including London's Oxford Circus and Manchester's Market Street stores.

=== do more GOOD (previously known as the 'Purpose Pillars') ===
schuh launched the Purpose Pillars in 2019. These are employee-led, volunteer groups that give different ideas and perspectives from a range of backgrounds across three main areas: Mental Wellness, Sustainability and Foster Diverse Talent (which includes racial, disability and LGBT+ equality).

In January 2026, the Purpose Pillars were repackaged as 'do more GOOD'. The new mission focuses on Wellbeing + Connection, Culture + Community and Environment.

=== Single and mixed size shoe schemes ===
In 2024 schuh launched initiatives in branch and online via the Customer Experience systems to offer single shoe and mixed sizes to customers. Customers with limb differences or disabilities are able to get up to 50% off purchases in these cases.

=== schuh ex display (formerly imperfects and branch309) ===
Formerly known as branch309 and schuh imperfects, the ex-display section of the schuh website lets customers browse items that have been removed from branches due to imperfections on the products. These items are sold at a cheaper price that normal.

=== schuh Welly Exchange ===
In 2009 schuh launched the schuh Welly Exchange at Scotland's RockNess Festival. The schuh Welly Exchange swaps festival goers old shoes for Wellington boots. The shoes were recycled by the Newlife Foundation. The schuh Welly Exchange appeared at Bestival, Oxegen, Camp Bestival, Global Gathering, Creamfields, Summer Sundae and RockNess.

In 2009 schuh also won the Best Brand Activation Award for the welly exchange at the UK festival awards.

=== schuh design challenge ===
In partnership with West Lothian Council, schuh launched the schuh Design Challenge in 1997. It has run every year since and is aimed at promoting fashion design in schools located near its head office in Livingston.

=== schuh magazine ===
Launched in 1998, the schuh magazine was distributed through its stores with cover stars include Caprice, Katie Price and Gail Porter. The magazine was produced by a team at head office and combined features on the company and its footwear along with music and other pop culture subjects. The final schuh magazine was released in 2006.

== Concessions, franchises and authorised stockists ==
=== Concession operations ===
schuh previously operated concession partnerships with a number of high street retailers.

In 1987, when schuh was bought over by the Glasgow based chain Goldberg, several concession branches of schuh operated in these department stores as well as within Goldberg sub-brands News, 'ing', Wrygges and Wrygges Man.

In the 1990s schuh operated concessions within FTC: Fosters Trading Company (formerly Foster Brothers) for a brief time. This was meant to continue as FTC changed to 'The Lounge', however with the demise of the parent company, this concession ended in 1998.

In 2001, schuh opened concessions within the newly created d2 Jeans fashion chain - created from the merger of Jeans For Sale (JFS), Jeanster and FTC: Fosters Trading Company (formerly Foster Brothers).

In 2004, schuh operated staffed concessions selling women's footwear in the newly launched Tempest stores across Ulster - a fashion led retail chain owned by parent company Menarys.

From 2004 until 2013, schuh operated in 30+ Republic clothing stores with staffed concessions. These were closed and replaced throughout 2013 and 2014 when Republic fell into administration.

=== Franchise branch ===
schuh operated a franchise branch in the Sahara Centre, Dubai in the United Arab Emirates from 2003 to 2004.

=== Authorised stockists ===
schuh is sold via Hirestreet on a rental basis. Hirestreet allows customers to rent footwear on demand or on a rotational basis.

== Timeline ==
- 1981: opened first store in Edinburgh's North Bridge Arcade.
- 1982: concession opened in Aberdeen above the city's 'Grand Canyon Clothing Company' on Union Street.
- 1983: schuh opened in Glasgow on Gordon Street and a second unit opened on North Bridge itself in Edinburgh.
- 1984: the first English store opened in Newcastle on Grainger Street and a third store opened in Edinburgh on Rose Street.
- 1985: the store in Glasgow was relocated to Union Street.
- 1986: a brief branch opened in Queen Street in Glasgow and the Newcastle store relocated to Eldon Square.
- 1987: only four stores remained (North Bridge and Rose Street in Edinburgh, Eldon Square in Newcastle and Glasgow Union Street) and schuh was taken into the Goldberg family of business. New schuh stand alone stores opened in Aberdeen at the Trinity Centre, East Kilbride in the Princes Mall and Hamilton on Regent Way.
- 1988: schuh was expanded alongside Wrygges and Wrygges Man within the Goldberg business with stores and concessions across Scotland, Wales and England. New standalone stores opened in Ayr (on High Street), Birmingham (in the Pavillions), Cardiff Queens West, Glasgow (at Parkhead Forge), Hounslow (in the Treaty Centre), Paisley (on the High Street and a sale shop in the Piazza), Southend (in the Royals Centre) and York (on the Stonegate).
- 1989: at its peak, Goldberg expanded schuh (and concessions within Wrygges and Wrygges Man) to 52 locations (including a new concession store at Merry Hill) however by the year end, 34 would remain.
- 1990: Goldberg tried to rebrand Wrygges as 'News' and 'ing' with schuh concessions in many locations however fell into administration before summer 1990. The schuh business was restructured with a new management team established in this buy back (six stores were saved - Glasgow Union Street, Edinburgh North Bridge and Rose Street, Aberdeen Trinity Centre, Hamilton Regent Way and Newcastle Eldon Square). A new store opened in Kirkcaldy.
- 1991: schuh HQ moved to Livingston at Dunlop Square, the Hamilton and Kirkcaldy units were closed and a deal was struck to open two concession styles stores in Glasgow (above Internacionale on Argyle Street) and Edinburgh (above State of Independence on Princes Street).
- 1992: schuh opened a new store in Dundee on the Cowgate and in Nottingham on Angel Row.
- 1993: saw the first major high street location in Leeds open on Commercial Street.
- 1994: new stores opened in Hull (on Whitefriargate), Liverpool (on Church Street) and Manchester (on Market Street).
- 1995: the concessions in Glasgow and Edinburgh closed (alongside the Rose Street location) and saw flagship branches open on Argyle Street in Glasgow and Frederick Street in Edinburgh as well as a unit in Sheffield on Fargate.
- 1996: the Nottingham store relocated to Long Row and stores opened in Belfast (on Royal Avenue), Birmingham (on New Street) and Leicester (on Gallowtree Gate).
- 1997: schuh opened the first Dublin store in the Jervis Centre as well as new units in Norwich (on Castle Street), Cardiff (on Queen Street) and in the Whitgift Centre in Croydon.
- 1998: new branches opened in Dublin (Liffey Valley), Glasgow (on Sauchiehall Street), Manchester (at the Trafford Centre) and the Leeds unit relocated to Briggate. A concession deal was struck with companies that would merge to become 'd2 Jeans' (Jeans For Sale JFS, Jeanster and Fosters Trading Company) to host schuh products (unstaffed in most locations).
- 1999: schuh won the first of many fashion awards
- 2000: new stores opened on O'Connell Street in Dublin, Milton Keynes and in Merry Hill as well as staffed concessions within the clothing chain 'Republic' at Middlesbrough and Derby.
- 2001: Glasgow, Dundee and Sheffield stores were relocated. A new store was opened at Ocean Terminal in Edinburgh as well as in Kent at Bluewater. New stores also opened in Reading and Southampton. The Croydon store was closed.
- 2002: schuh launched its own men's footwear label 'Momentum'. New 'Republic' concessions opened and a staffed concession deal was struck in Ulster for six units in the Menarys subchain 'Tempest' to stock women's product. New stores opened in Galway, Lakeside, Meadowhall and Newcastle. The Glasgow store on Union Street was closed.
- 2003: a franchise store opened in Dubai at the Sahara Centre (and would close the following year). New branches opened in Birmingham, Brighton, Inverness and Oxford. New Republic and Tempest concessions opened. The Leicester store relocated. All concessions within d2 Jeans closed.
- 2004: schuh opened a new flagship store on Oxford Street in London. A swathe of new Republic and Tempest locations opened. Branches of schuh opened in Crawley, Metro Centre and in Stirling.
- 2005: new stores opened at the Dundrum centre in Dublin, Maidstone in Kent and in Norwich.
- 2006: all the Tempest concessions closed as well as a handful of Republic ones (although new locations opened too). Merry Hill unit relocated and new stores opened in Cork, Leeds at White Rose and in Plymouth.
- 2007: an expansion saw new stores in Derby, Exeter and Limerick on Bedford Row. A new store opened at the Silverburn Shopping Centre in Glasgow.
- 2008: a second London store opened in the Westfield London development at White City as well as the Foyleside Centre in Ulster, Bristol and in Cambridge. Many quieter concession locations within Republic were closed.
- 2009: The schuh welly exchange appeared at five UK festivals and the company won a UK Festival award for Best Brand Activation. There were new stores in Sunderland, Swansea and at the Blanchardstown centre in Dublin. The final two Republic concessions opened in Chester and at the Glasgow Fort retail park.
- 2010: schuh opened a ‘hometown’ store in Livingston at the Elements centre. New stores opened in Cheltenham and Peterborough and the Newcastle Eldon Square store relocated.
- 2011: schuh celebrated its 30th year with a huge company wide celebration, several new stores opened (Bournemouth, Guildford, London at Stratford, Portsmouth, Watford and Wigan), the Market Street store in Manchester was relocated and schuh was brought in to the USA corporation Genesco umbrella of businesses.
- 2012: schuh | kids was launched in Glasgow at Braehead as well as in Liverpool and Lakeside. New stores opened in Bath, Bristol, Cardiff, Chester, Colchester, Dublin (at Swords), Glasgow (at Braehead), London (at Wood Green and Brent Cross), Liverpool, Solihull, Truro and Warrington.
- 2013: the longstanding 'founding' store on North Bridge in Edinburgh was closed. Republic fell into administration and all schuh concessions immediately closed. Ten locations received temporary 'schuh pop-up' stores (Basingstoke, Blackburn, Carlisle, Doncaster, Gloucester, Hanley, Luton, Middlesbrough, Nuneaton and Swindon) and all would receive a new schuh store except Middlesbrough and Gloucester within a year. New stores opened at Glasgow Fort (including a schuh | kids store), Edinburgh (at the Gyle Centre), Hull, Jersey, London (at Canary Wharf, Kingston and Marble Arch), Teesside, West Bromwich, Whiteley, Wolverhampton and York). The Stirling store relocated.
- 2014: new stores opened in Bexleyheath, Birmingham Fort and London at Covent Garden. The final 'schuh pop-up' stores closed.
- 2015: schuh opened its first stores outside of the UK and Republic of Ireland in the Centro shopping centre in Oberhausen, Germany. Two more followed in Ruhr Park and Essen. New schuh | kids stores opened in Plymouth, Norwich and Brighton. New branches of schuh opened in Hastings, High Wycombe, Newbury, Salisbury, St. Albans and Windsor. Second stores opened in York and Limerick and the Leeds store at White Rose relocated.
- 2016: Nottingham, Aberdeen and Dundee stores relocated. New stores opened in Bradford, Chelmsford, Coventry, Harrow, Newport and Romford. schuh returned to Hounslow for the first time since the Goldberg years. New schuh | kids locations opened in Belfast, Bluewater, London Stratford and Metro Centre.
- 2017: the original Cardiff store closed. New schuh | kids stores opened in Glasgow St. Enoch Centre, Leeds at White Rose and Meadowhall. New stores opened in Guernsey, London at Tottenham Court Road and Rushden Lakes.
- 2018: the Oxford store relocated and opened alongside a new schuh | kids store. The Edinburgh store at Ocean Terminal was relocated to Fort Kinnaird with a schuh | kids store too. The Lakeside store was given the same treatment and received another new schuh | kids store. A new schuh | kids unit also opened in Bristol and a schuh store in Eastbourne was opened.
- 2019: all three German stores were closed but a web presence continued. The longstanding Glasgow store on Sauchiehall Street was relocated to Buchanan Galleries.
- 2020: schuh successfully navigated the covid-19 pandemic lockdowns and closed stores in Coventry, Liverpool, London and Newport.
- 2021: the Livingston store received a new schuh | kids branch next door. The Sheffield city centre and Wolverhampton stores were closed.
- 2022: the Belfast and Metro Centre stores were relocated. A new schuh | kids opened in the Manchester Trafford Centre and the stores in Harrow and Windsor were closed.
- 2023: the Inverness Store was relocated to the out of town Shopping Park, Merry Hill received a schuh | kids and a store was opened near Leicester at Fosse Park.
- 2024: the stores in Hounslow, Luton, Nuneaton and Swindon were closed. schuh returned to London at White City and opened three new stores in Liverpool and Broughton Shopping Parks as well as in Ulster at Rushmere Retail park.
- 2025: stores in Leeds, Brighton, Limerick, High Wycombe, London Brent Cross and Wigan were closed and the Edinburgh Frederick Street location was moved to a new Scottish flagship store at the St. James Quarter development not far from where the company started at North Bridge in the arcade.
- 2026: schuh launched the 'do more GOOD' campaign to replace the Purpose Pillars. After closing in Leeds city center the previous year, schuh opened a new store in the Trinity Centre in Leeds. A successful relocation saw schuh move in May 2026 to the Union Square development in Aberdeen. Older and underperforming stores were closed.

== Awards ==
- Winner: Best Footwear Marketing Campaign (Single Shoe Initiative) 2025
- Winner: Footwear Retailer of the Year (Eldon Square, Newcastle) 2025
- Winner: Footwear Retailer of the Year for schuh | kids (Trafford Centre, Manchester) 2024
- Winner: Footwear Retailer of the Year (Queensgate, Peterborough) 2024
- Winner: Best Use of Technology (the schuh Club) Drapers Footwear Awards 2023
- Winner: Best Footwear Store Design (Manchester Trafford Kids) Drapers Footwear Awards 2023
- Winner: Diversity and Inclusion (Disability Equality Purpose Pillar) Drapers Footwear Awards 2022
- Winner: Scottish Fashion Awards 2013
