= Journeys (company) =

Specialty chain retailer

- Type: Subsidiary
- Industry: Retail
- Founded: December 1986; 39 years ago in Nashville, Tennessee, US
- Headquarters: Nashville, Tennessee
- Number of locations: 940 (2026)
- Area served: North America
- Key people: Andy Gray (President); Mike Sypert (Chief Operating Officer); Chris Santaella (Chief Merchandising Officer); Stacy Doren ( Chief Marketing Officer)
- Products: Shoes, Clothing, Accessories
- Brands: Journeys, Journeys Kidz, Little Burgundy
- Parent: Genesco
- Website: journeys.com

Journeys is a specialty chain retailer, owned by Genesco, of branded fashion footwear and accessories with approximately 940 stores nationwide. Journeys operates five retail concepts across North America including Journeys, Journeys Kidz, Shi by Journeys, Underground by Journeys and Little Burgundy. Journeys is focused on "quickly shifting fashion footwear trends", and is described as the anti-Foot Locker.

== History ==
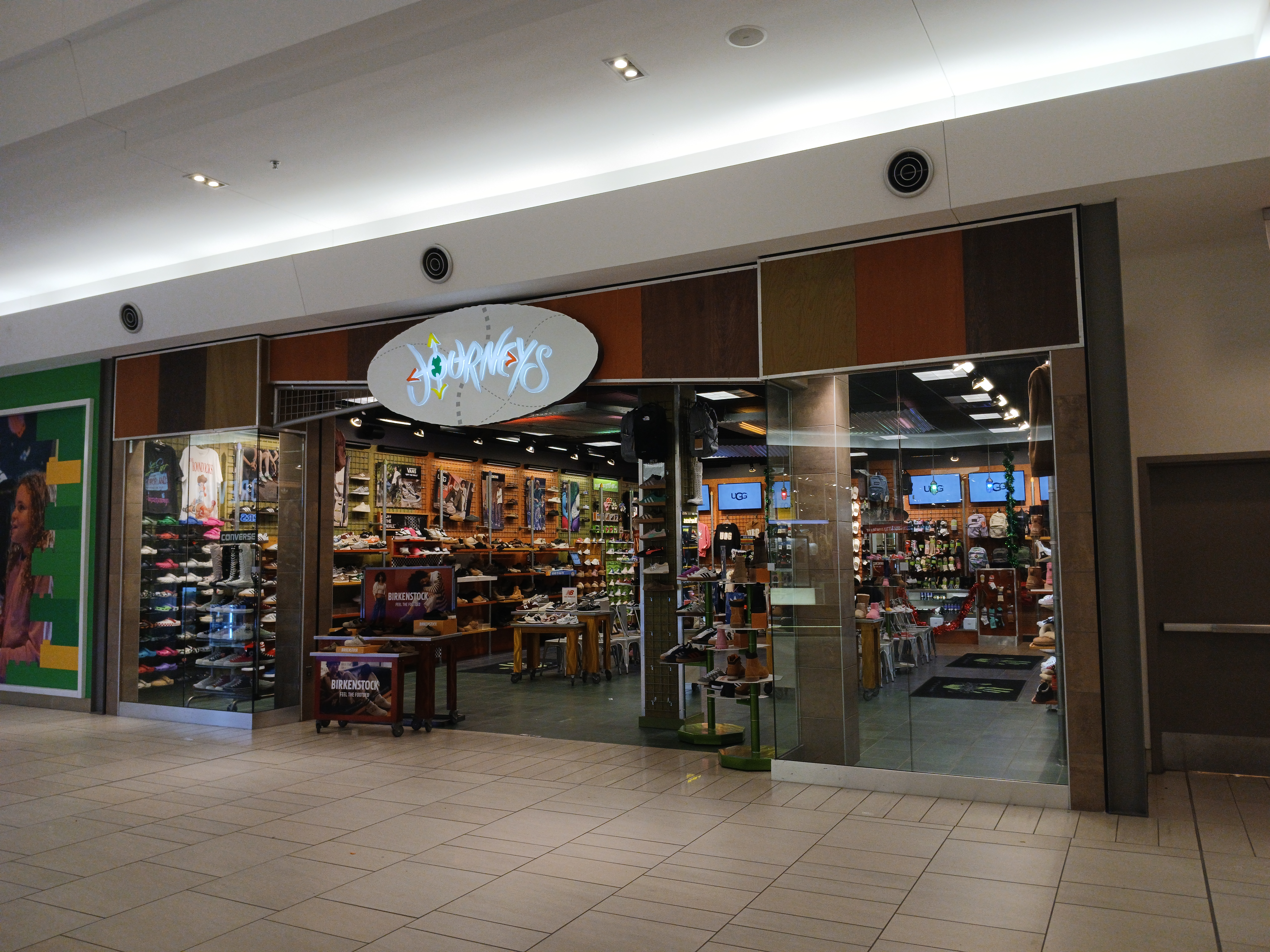
Journeys store at Springfield Town Center, Springfield, Virginia, in November 2024

Journeys opened its first store in Nashville, Tennessee at Rivergate Mall in December 1986. Within ten years, Journeys had opened 100 stores, and by 1999 launched its website. In 2001, Journeys Kidz opened its first location, followed by an opening of Shï in 2005. In 2010, Journeys opened its first store in Canada. In 2011, Journeys started the "Attitude That Cares" program to encourage its employees to get involved locally in community outreach & service. In 2014, Journeys began its partnership with the Vans Warped Tour, becoming its Presenting Sponsor for its 20th Anniversary tour. In 2015, Journeys became the title sponsor of the Alternative Press Music Awards. In 2021, Journeys announced a partnership with Can’dAid, (candaid.org), an organization that rallies volunteers from all walks of life to build thriving communities.

In 2018, Journeys partnered with Converse to put on a free prom for teens in Houston, Texas.

== Brands ==
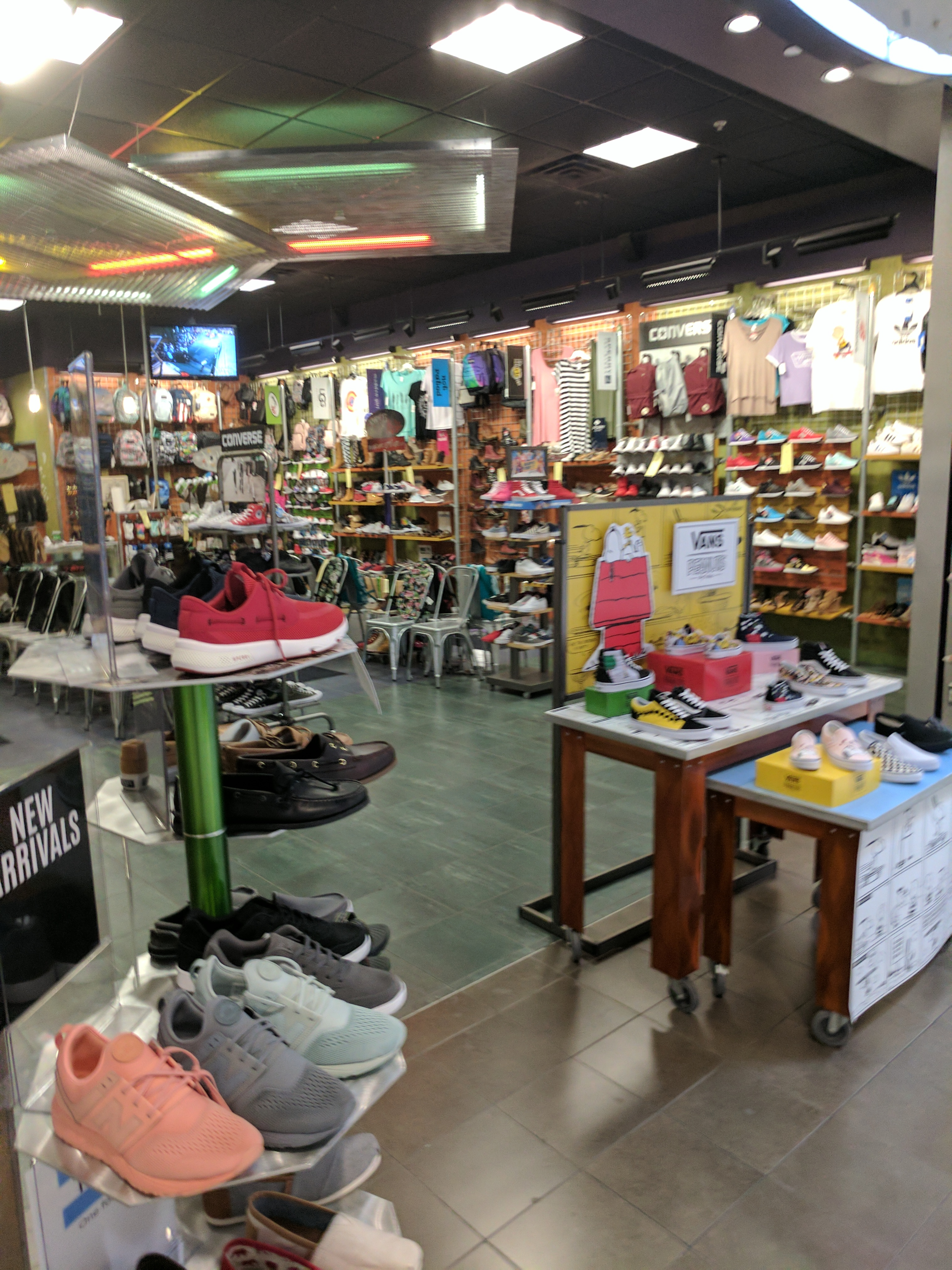
Interior of a Journeys store, Barton Creek Square, in June 2017

=== Journeys ===
Journeys is a teen specialty footwear retailer. The first location opened at the Rivergate Mall in Nashville, Tennessee, in 1986, and there now are stores in every state and $1 billion in sales.

=== Journeys Kidz ===
Journeys Kidz is a specialty footwear brand that opened its first store in 2001 for kids 5–12 years old, with the tagline “Big Kidz Shoes, Little Kidz Sizes.” There are 170 locations in the United States.

=== Little Burgundy ===
Little Burgundy was purchased from the Aldo Group in 2015, adding 37 retail stores. The brand is focused on students and young professionals.
