= Cueva de Los Indios =

Historic place in Loíza, Puerto Rico

- U.S. National Register of Historic Places
- Puerto Rico Historic Sites and Zones
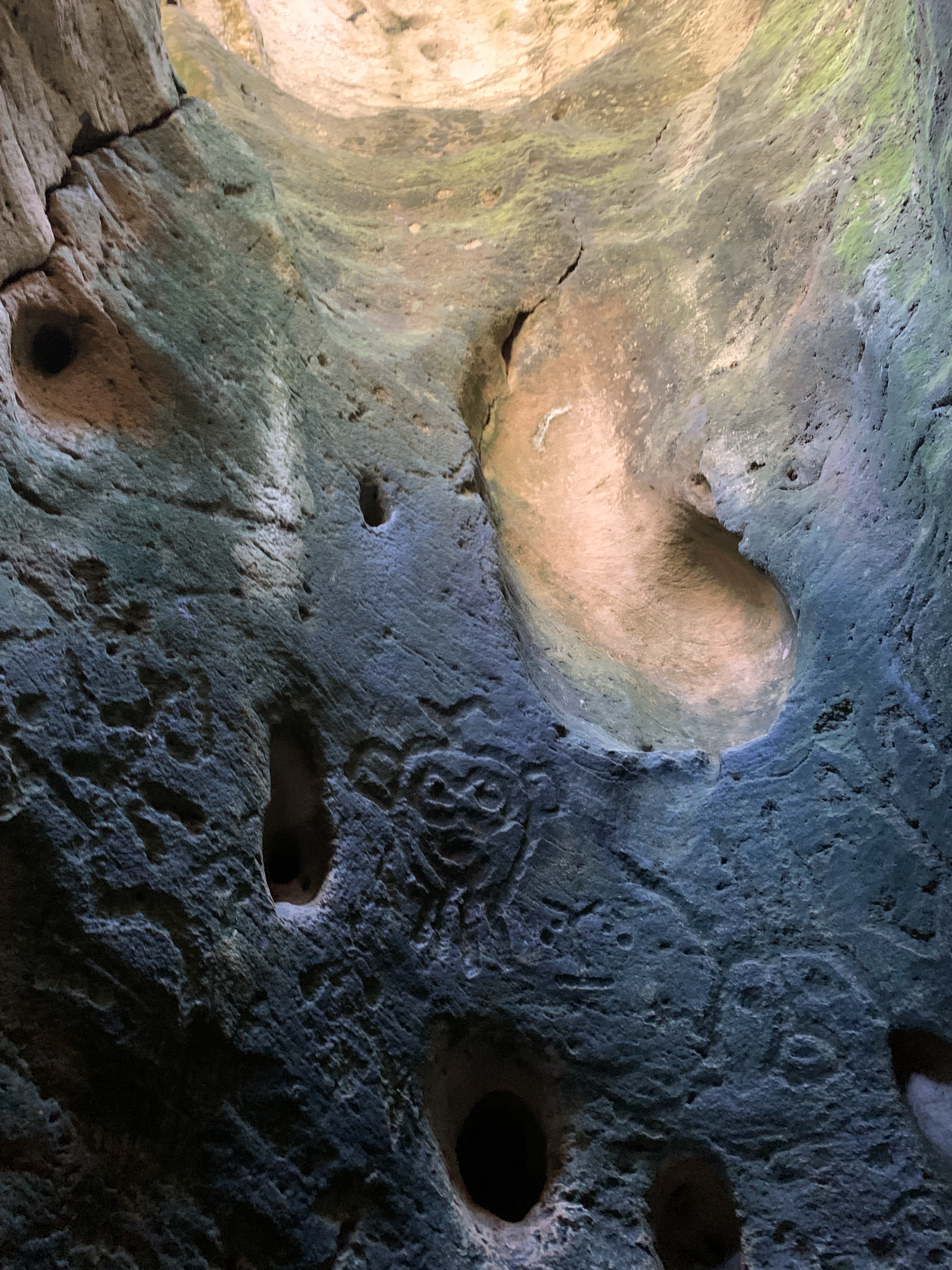
- Location: Address restricted
- Nearest city: Loíza, Puerto Rico
- NRHP reference No.: 82003823
- RNSZH No.: 2000-(RMSJ)-00-JP-SH

Significant dates
- Added to NRHP: June 24, 1982
- Designated RNSZH: February 3, 2000

Cueva de Los Indios, also known as the Cueva Punta Maldonado site, in the municipality of Loíza, Puerto Rico, was listed on the National Register of Historic Places in 1982, and on the Puerto Rico Register of Historic Sites and Zones in 2000.

It is a "small" cave with petroglyphs that were, as of 1981, well-preserved, with no evidence of vandalism or other disturbance. In 1981 it was asserted that site is the "only recorded ceremonial cave in the northeastern coast of Puerto Rico that corresponds to the Taino aboriginal occupation" and that it was a site with high archeological research potential.
