= Jennifer Barreto =

Puerto Rican beauty pageant titleholder (born 1998)

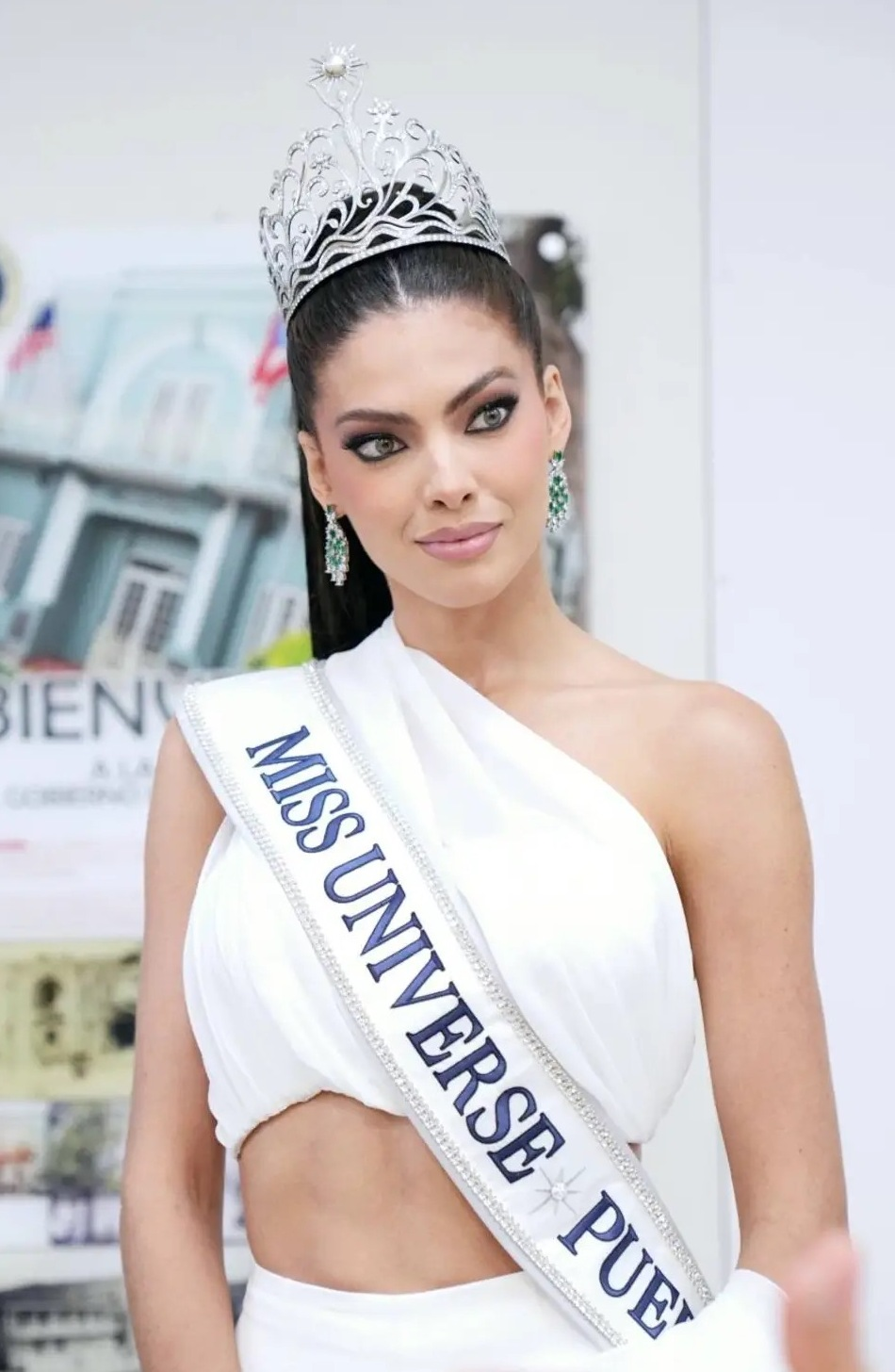
- Barreto in July 2026
- Born: Jennifer Abreu Mora; December 17, 1998 (age 27); Mayagüez, Puerto Rico
- Height: 5 ft 11 in (180 cm)
- Spouse: Yan Carlos Barreto Calderón
- Children: 1
- Beauty pageant titleholder
- Title: Miss Universe Puerto Rico 2026
- Hair color: Brown
- Eye color: Green
- Major competitions: Miss Universe Puerto Rico 2026; (Winner); Miss Universe 2026; (TBD)

Jennifer Barreto (née Abreu Mora; born 17 December 1998), also popularly known as La Barreto, is a Puerto Rican model and beauty pageant titleholder who won Miss Universe Puerto Rico 2026. She will represent Puerto Rico at Miss Universe 2026, which is to be held in the archipelago and island.

== Early life and education ==
In 1998, Jennifer Abreu Mora was born to Jeffrey Abreu Vázquez and Alicia Mora González in Mayagüez, Puerto Rico. Raised in Isabela and partly educated in neighboring San Sebastián and Aguadilla, she played volleyball from elementary to high school.

She graduated university with a bachelor's degree in research psychology, and two master's degrees, one in psychology and another in clinical social work.

== Career ==
In 2021, Barreto began her professional career in the service of the United States Department of Defense in Fort Hood, Texas. As an educator and crisis co-responder under the Family Advocacy Program, she provided support to military families suffering from domestic violence and child abuse, in addition to offering training to leaders in prevention and intervention strategies. She also volunteered at the Carl R. Darnall Army Medical Center.

Later, she became a Prevention Specialist, a position from which she leads community needs assessments, the development of comprehensive prevention plans, and the analysis of risk factors to combat harmful behaviors and strengthen well-being within military communities.

As part of her social work, she also collaborates with the Pediatric Diabetes Association in Puerto Rico.

== Pageantry ==
=== Miss Universe Puerto Rico 2026 ===
In the summer of 2025, Barreto began her preparation to compete in Miss Universe Puerto Rico without prior experience in pageantry and modeling. She lost 70 pounds in the process.

The following year, Barreto represented the municipality of San Sebastián at Miss Universe Puerto Rico 2026, winning the 70th edition of the pageant, which was celebrated at the Ángel O. Berríos Performing Arts Center on June 25, 2026. Crowned by her predecessor Zashely Alicea, she became the first married woman and second mother to win the title, after Jennifer Colón in 2024.

At the preliminary competition, she won the most awards, namely "Piel Radiante L'Oréal París" (Radiant Skin L'Oréal Paris), "Sonrisa Colgate" (Colgate Smile), and "Mejor Pasarela" (Best Catwalk).

=== Miss Universe 2026 ===
She will represent Puerto Rico at the 75th Miss Universe pageant, Miss Universe 2026, which is scheduled to be held in the archipelago and island. She will be the 72nd delegate to represent Puerto Rico at Miss Universe and the fourth Puerto Rican to participate as a host delegate, after Barbara Torres at Miss Universe 1972, Denise Quiñones at Miss Universe 2001, and Isis Casalduc at Miss Universe 2002.

== Personal life ==
Barreto is married to U.S. Army Sergeant Yan Carlos Barreto Calderón, a military service member native to Isabela, Puerto Rico who provides logistical support to the 101st Airborne Division of the United States Army. In 2019, the couple welcomed a daughter named Penélope.

Awards and achievements
Preceded by Zashely Alicea, Dorado	Miss Universe Puerto Rico; 2026	Incumbent
