= Miss Universe Puerto Rico 2026 =

70th Miss Universe Puerto Rico

- Date: June 25, 2026
- Presenters: José Santana; Viviana Ortiz
- Venue: Ángel O. Berríos Performing Arts Center, Caguas, Puerto Rico
- Broadcaster: WAPA-TV
- Entrants: 35
- Placements: 15
- Winner: Jennifer Barreto; San Sebastián
- Personality: Andrea Zerpa, Toa Alta
- Photogenic: Vivianie Díaz-Arroyo, Aguas Buenas

Miss Universe Puerto Rico 2026 was the 70th Miss Universe Puerto Rico pageant, held at the Ángel O. Berríos Performing Arts Center in Caguas, Puerto Rico, on June 25, 2026.

Zashely Alicea of Dorado crowned Jennifer Barreto of San Sebastián as her successor at the end of the event. Barreto will represent Puerto Rico at Miss Universe 2026, which will be held in the archipelago and island later in the year.

== Results ==
=== Placements ===
Placement	Contestant	Ref.
Miss Universe Puerto Rico 2026	San Sebastián – Jennifer Barreto	
1st runner-up	Arroyo – Génesis Dávila	
2nd runner-up	Aguas Buenas – Vivianie Díaz-Arroyo	
3rd runner-up	Aibonito – Nicole Marie Colón	
4th runner-up	Añasco – Chelsey García (Miss Cosmo Puerto Rico 2026)	
Top 8	Orocovis – Ariana Pagán; Salinas – Natalia Molina; Utuado – Krystal González	
Top 15	Caguas – Fabiola Medina; Carolina – Yamirelis Carrasquillo; Coamo – Mayra Núñez; Dorado – Winedly Lugo; Juana Díaz – Anaís Torres; Manatí – Kiashalee Ruiz; Toa Baja – Vicky Carbonell (Miss Grand Puerto Rico 2026)	

=== Special awards ===
Award	Winner	Ref.
Miss Photogenic	Aguas Buenas – Vivianie Díaz-Arroyo	
Miss Personality	Toa Alta – Andrea Zerpa	
Total Look	Juana Díaz – Anaís Torres	
L´Oréal Most Beautiful Hair	Aguas Buenas – Vivianie Díaz-Arroyo	
L´Oréal Most Radiant Skin	San Sebastián – Jennifer Barreto	
L´Oréal Mujer De Valor	Arroyo – Génesis Dávila	
Best Catwalk	San Sebastián – Jennifer Barreto	
Colgate Impactful Smile	San Sebastián – Jennifer Barreto	

== Contestants ==
35 contestants competed for the title:

Municipality	Contestant	Age
Adjuntas	Grecia Isabel Ortiz Báez	21
Aguadillla	Deyhaneira Nieves Chaves	30
Aguas Buenas	Vivianie Díaz-Arroyo	27
Aibonito	Nicole Marie Colón Rivera	32
Añasco	Chelsey Mary García Agrón	28
Arroyo	Génesis María Dávila Pérez	35
Barceloneta	Adriana Pérez Mercado	34
Barranquitas	Pamela Alejandra Rodríguez Rivera	26
Caguas	Fabiola Esther Medina Soltero	31
Camuy	Nashley Pariente	29
Canóvanas	Beruchka Rivera Soto	27
Carolina	Yamirelis Carrasquillo Fernández	28
Cataño	Nayshla Michelle Rosa Pagán	32
Cidra	Gabriel Rodríguez Velázquez	25
Coamo	Mayra Alejandra Núñez Soto	25
Corozal	Addylinette Castro Hernández	25
Dorado	Winedly Lugo Lind	38
Fajardo	Leilani Verdejo	25
Guaynabo	Arlene González Robles	35
Gurabo	Lucylí Lleras Rodriguez	31
Isabela	Katielynn Rodriguez	30
Juana Díaz	Anaís Torres Colls	35
Lajas	Amanda Calderón Valero	26
Manatí	Kiashalee Ruiz Maldonado	34
Mayagüez	Ángela Sofía Santos	23
Orocovis	Ariana Pagán González	20
Ponce	Juleissy Pacheco Ocasio	19
Rincón	Maidily Ortiz	21
Salinas	Natalia Molina Colón	24
San Juan	Juliandra De Jesus Berru	26
San Sebastián	Jennifer Barreto	27
Toa Alta	Andrea Zerpa	25
Toa Baja	Vicky Carbonell Cuevas	24
Trujillo Alto	Victoria Gabriela Negrón Torres	20
Utuado	Krystal Lorene González Del Valle	23

== Judges ==
=== Preliminary ===
- Orlando Cañizares Jr. – Plastic surgeon
- Dámaris Díaz – President of D'Royal Bride
- Johnmichael Colón – Illusionist
- Ingrid Rivera – Professional makeup artist and stylist
- Marian Guillén – Former international model
- Sylvia Verónica Camacho – Journalist
- Emilio Olabarrieta – Businessman
