= Caguas barrio-pueblo =

Historical and administrative center (seat) of Caguas, Puerto Rico

Caguas barrio-pueblo Pueblo de Caguas
- Municipality seat
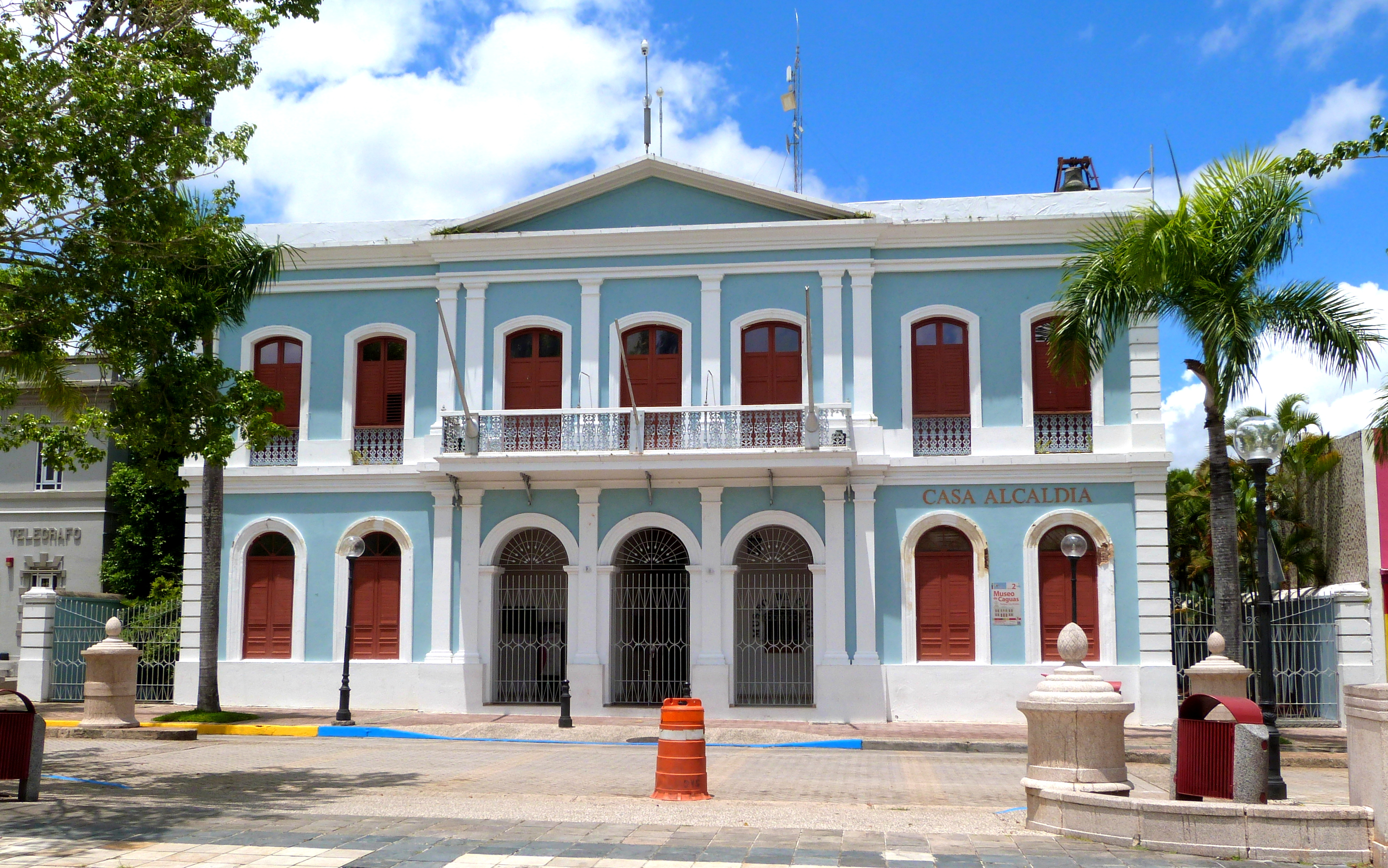
- The old Caguas City Hall is a museum

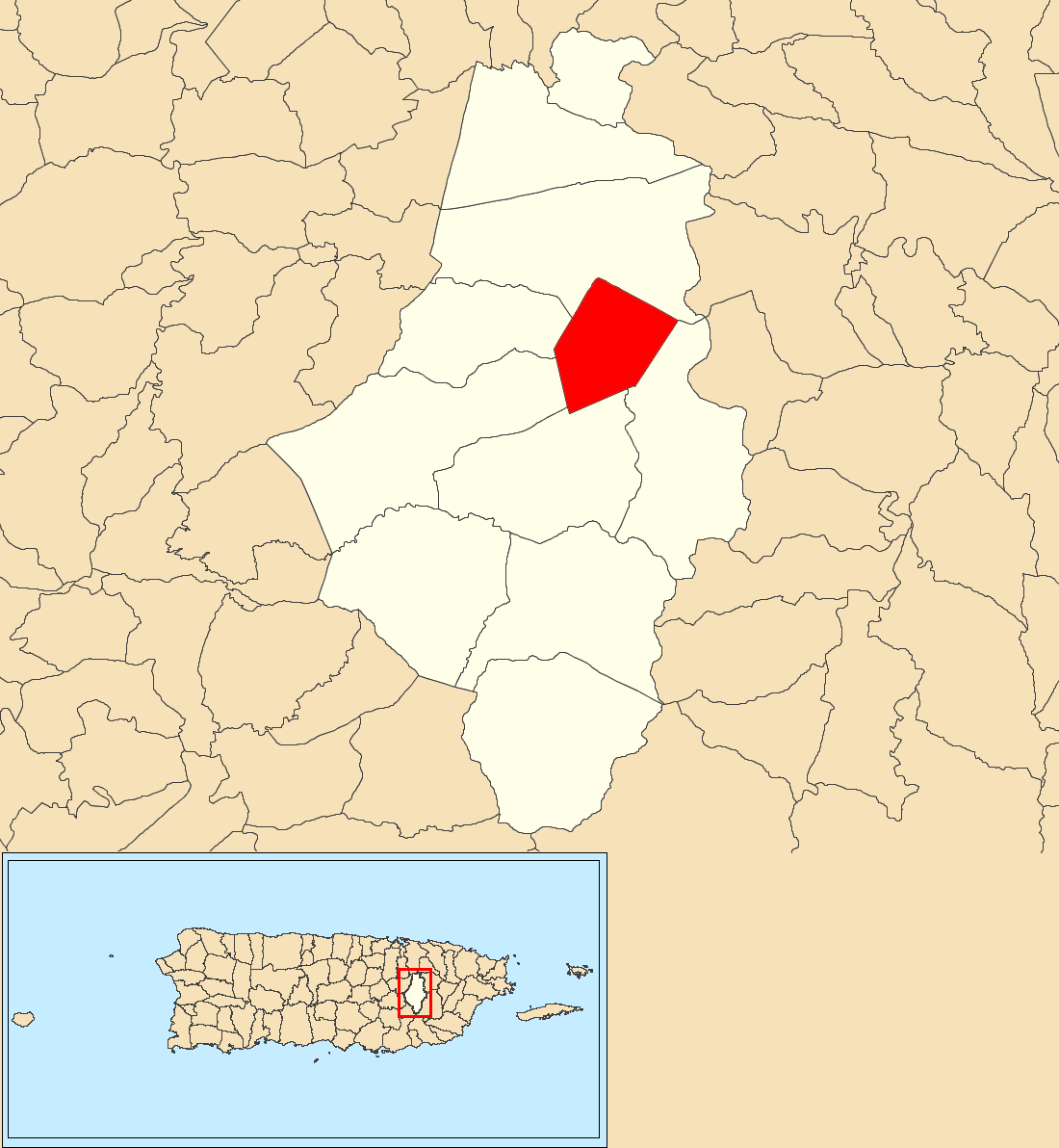
- Location of Caguas barrio-pueblo within the municipality of Caguas shown in red

- Location of Puerto Rico
- Coordinates: 18°14′02″N 66°02′00″W
- Commonwealth: Puerto Rico
- Municipality: Caguas

Area
  - Total: 2.67 sq mi (6.9 km^{2})
  - Land: 2.67 sq mi (6.9 km^{2})
  - Water: 0 sq mi (0 km^{2})
- Elevation: 233 ft (71 m)

Population (2020)
  - Total: 19,020
  - Density: 8,391.8/sq mi (3,240.1/km^{2})
- Source: 2010 Census
- Time zone: UTC−4 (AST)
- ZIP Code: 00725, 00726, 00727
- Area codes: 787, 939

Caguas Pueblo is a barrio and downtown area that serves the administrative center (seat) of Caguas, a municipality of Puerto Rico. It is bordered by the Cagüitas River to the north and located two miles southwest of the Río Grande de Loíza. Its population in 2020 was 19,020.

As was customary in Spain, in Puerto Rico, the municipality has a barrio called pueblo (barrio-pueblo starting with the 1990 US Census) which contains a central plaza or main town square, the municipal buildings (such as the city hall), and a Catholic church. Fiestas patronales (patron saint festivals) are held in the main town square every year. The municipal and mayoral offices were located in the City Hall building at the western edge of the main town square until 2010 when a new City Hall building located in the northwestern side of the downtown area was inaugurated.

The historic downtown district (pueblo) of Caguas was listed on the Puerto Rico Register of Historic Sites and Zones (Registro Nacional de Sitios y Zonas Históricas) on July 6, 1996, under the name Zona Histórica de Caguas.

== Geography ==
Caguas Pueblo (Spanish: Pueblo de Caguas), officially designated as Caguas Barrio-pueblo and popularly referred to as Downtown Caguas in English, is located in the middle plains of the Caguas Valley. It is bordered by the Cagüitas River to the north, the Loíza River to the east and the Turabo River to the south.

== History ==
The area where downtown Caguas is located today was originally inhabited by the Taíno people. This area of the valley was ideal for the cultivation of crops, such as cassava, due to the fertile river-fed soil. At the time of the Spanish colonization the local tribes were led by the cacique Caguax, from whom the Spanish settlement of San Sebastián del Piñal de Caguax got its name. This village was granted town privileges in 1812 and its first city hall was built in 1820 when it received the title of Villa y cabeza de distrito de Provincia de España ("Villa and District headquarters of a Spanish province"). The village was finally granted full city rights in 1894.

Caguas barrio-pueblo was in Spain's gazetteers until Puerto Rico was ceded by Spain in the aftermath of the Spanish–American War under the terms of the Treaty of Paris of 1898 and became an unincorporated territory of the United States. In 1899, the United States Department of War conducted a census of Puerto Rico finding that the population of Caguas Pueblo was 5,450. The area was heavily damaged by San Felipe Segundo (also known as the 1928 Okeechobee hurricane) in 1928 and many historical buildings were demolished then, which is why many of the older buildings, such as the cathedral, date from the 1930s after many rebuilding projects in the downtown took place.

== The central plaza and its church ==
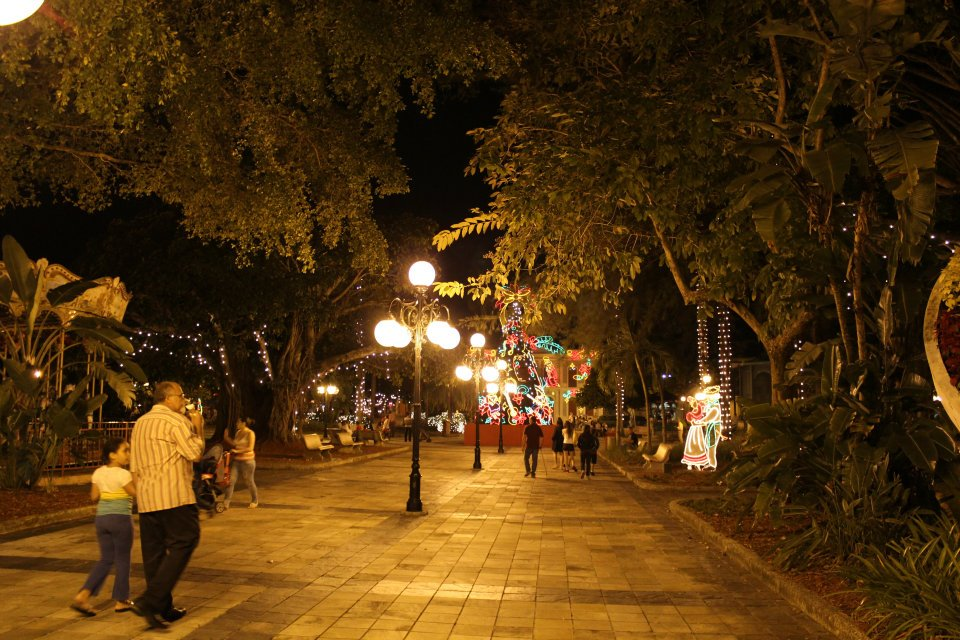
Plaza Palmer during Christmas

The main town square of Caguas is named Plaza de Recreo Santiago R. Palmer. This is one of the largest main town squares or plazas in Puerto Rico. The central plaza or square, is a public space that is often used for official and unofficial recreational events and is a place where people can gather and socialize from dusk to dawn. The Laws of the Indies, Spanish law, which regulated life in Puerto Rico in the early 19th century, stated the plaza's purpose was for "the parties" (celebrations, festivities) (Spanish: a propósito para las fiestas), and that the square should be proportionally large enough for the number of neighbors (Spanish: grandeza proporcionada al número de vecinos). These Spanish regulations also stated that the streets nearby should be comfortable portals for passersby, protecting them from the elements: sun and rain.

Located across from the central plaza in Caguas barrio-pueblo is the Catedral Dulce Nombre de Jesús which serves as the regional Catholic cathedral. A hermitage was built in 1626 and by 1775 it had been renamed to its current name. In 1830 the construction of a church made of masonry began. The church was used until 1928 when it was damaged by San Felipe Segundo hurricane. Having sustained too much damage, it was demolished and reconstructed starting in 1936 based on an architectural design by Pedro Méndez and Joseph O'Kelly. The church was restored in 1999. In 1964 the church became a cathedral.

Historical population
Census	Pop.	Note	%±
1900	5,450		—
1910	10,354		90.0%
1920	12,149		17.3%
1930	19,791		62.9%
1940	24,377		23.2%
1950	33,759		38.5%
1960	32,015		−5.2%
1970	0		−100.0%
1980	28,729		—
1990	26,065		−9.3%
2000	24,023		−7.8%
2010	22,406		−6.7%
2020	19,020		−15.1%
U.S. Decennial Census; 1899 (shown as 1900) 1910-1930; 1930-1950 1980-2000 2010 2020

== Landmarks and places of interest ==
- Aguayo Aldea Vocational High School, historical Art Deco building from 1939 listed on the National Register of Historic Places.
- Caguas Cathedral Dulce Nombre de Jesús, the historical Catholic cathedral of the Diocese of Caguas.
- Caguas Museum of Art, housed in a historic building known as Casa Amarilla.
- Caguas Museum of Folk Arts, dedicated to the popular arts and crafts of Caguas and Puerto Rico.
- Caguas Museum of History in the old city hall.
- Caguas Museum of Tobacco, dedicated to the history of tobacco in Caguas and the Caribbean.
- Centro Criollo de Ciencias y Tecnología del Caribe, a science and technology institution hosting special educational events, a museum, science and engineering workshops and a movie theater.
- Centro de Bellas Artes de Caguas, the municipal center for performing arts which houses one of the largest theaters in Puerto Rico.
- First Baptist Church of Caguas, historic church and museum.
- Gautier Benítez High School, historical Neoclassical building from 1924 also listed on the National Register of Historic Places.
- Las Catalinas Mall, located in the former Central Santa Catalina sugarcane plantation and refinery.
- Logia Unión y Amparo No. 44, historic masonic lodge.
- Old Telegraph at the Casa del Rey building next to the city hall.
- Paseo de las Artes Abelardo Díaz Alfaro, a promenade located next to the Caguas Center for Performing Arts, popular for its nightlife and social events.
- Paseo Gautier Benítez, a pedestrian street with stores, restaurants and bars.
- Plaza del Mercado de Caguas, the city's main marketplace which today houses food stores, restaurants, private offices and often hosts cultural events.
- Plaza Juan Corujo Collazo, a small square and recreational park.
- Taíno Heritage Monument, popularly known as La India de Caguas.

== Gallery ==
Places in Caguas barrio-pueblo:

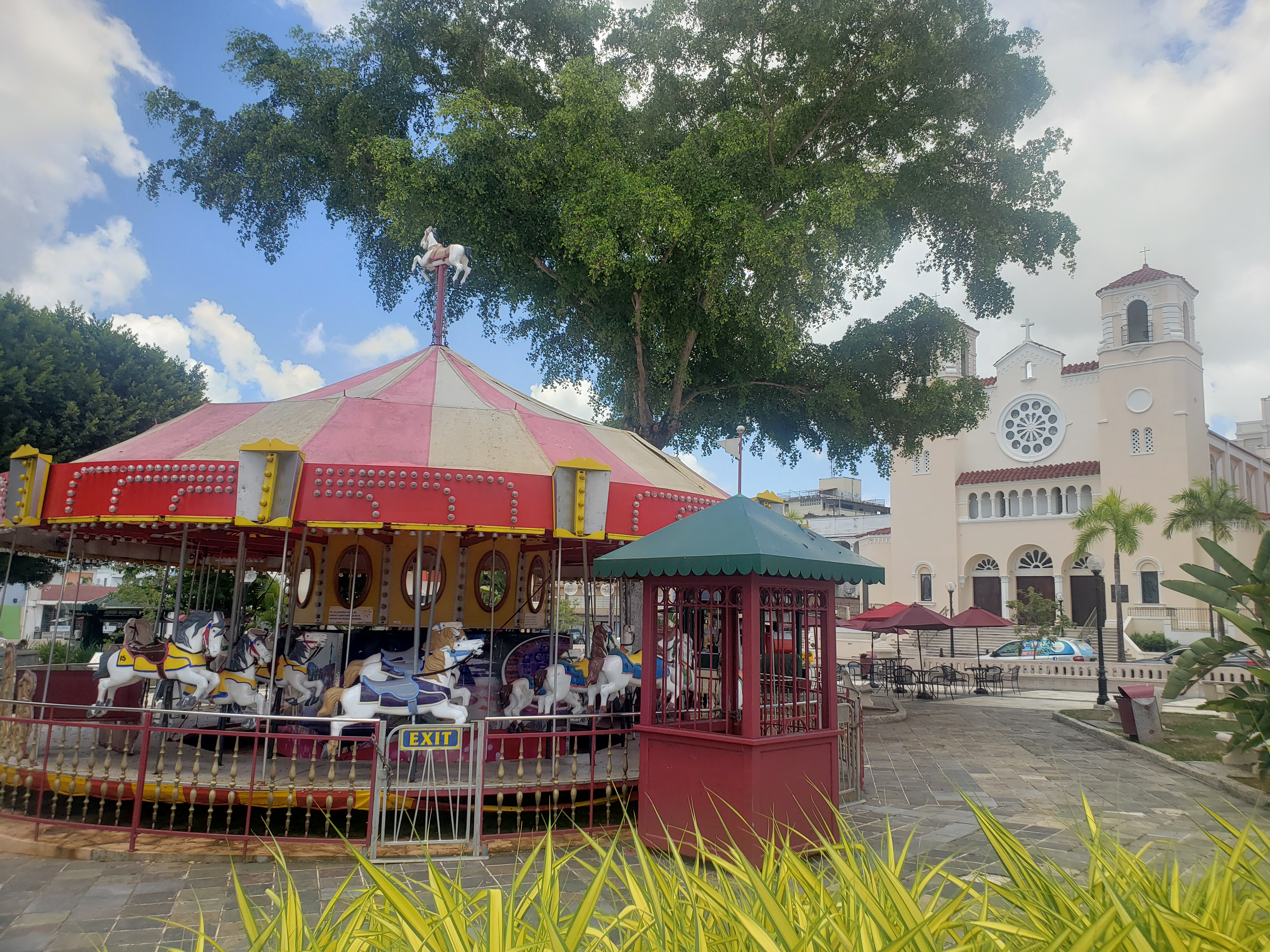
Carousel in Plaza Palmer (main town square) and the cathedral in the back

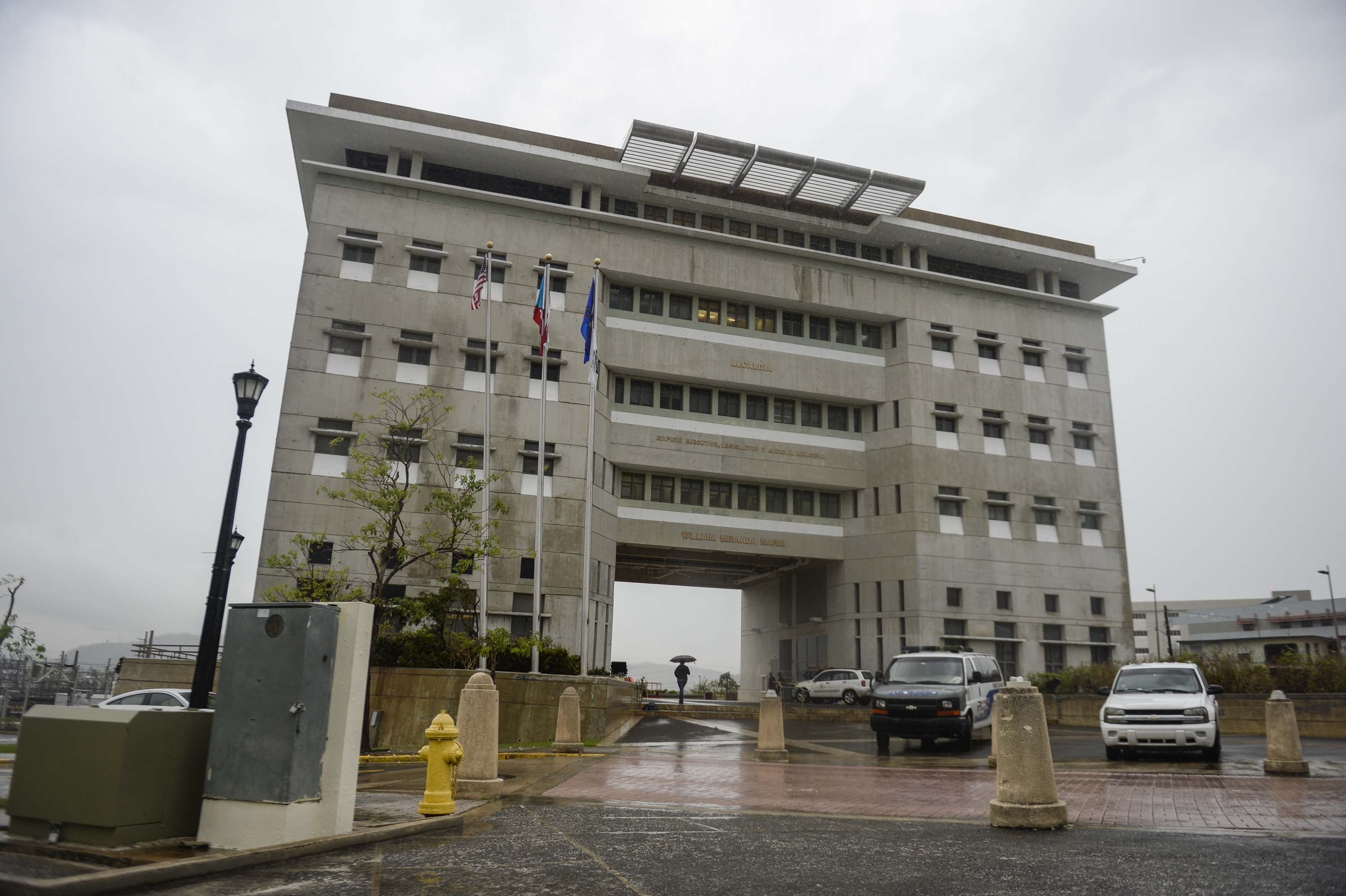
New Caguas City Hall

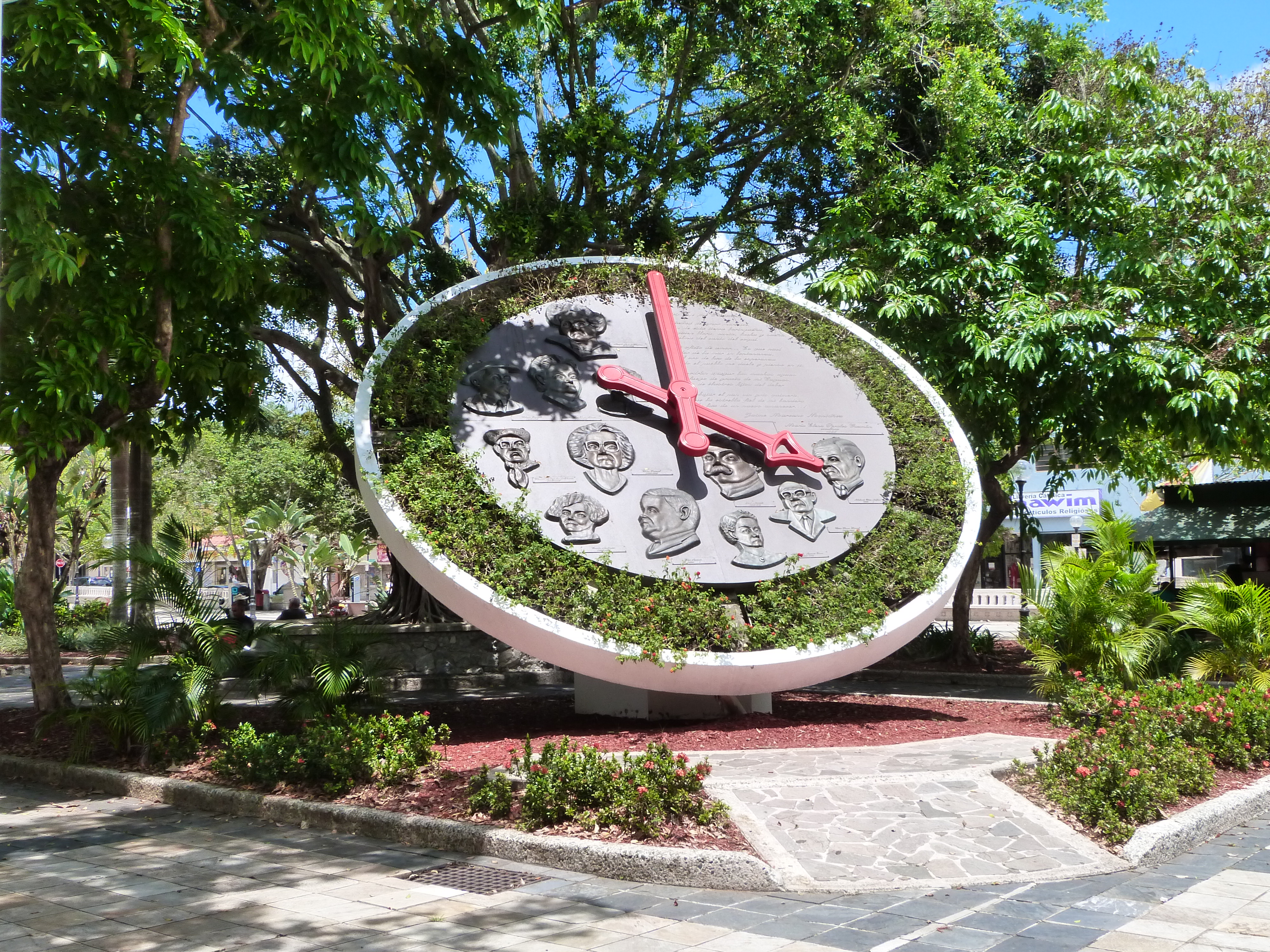
Floral clock with faces of famous past citizens of Caguas

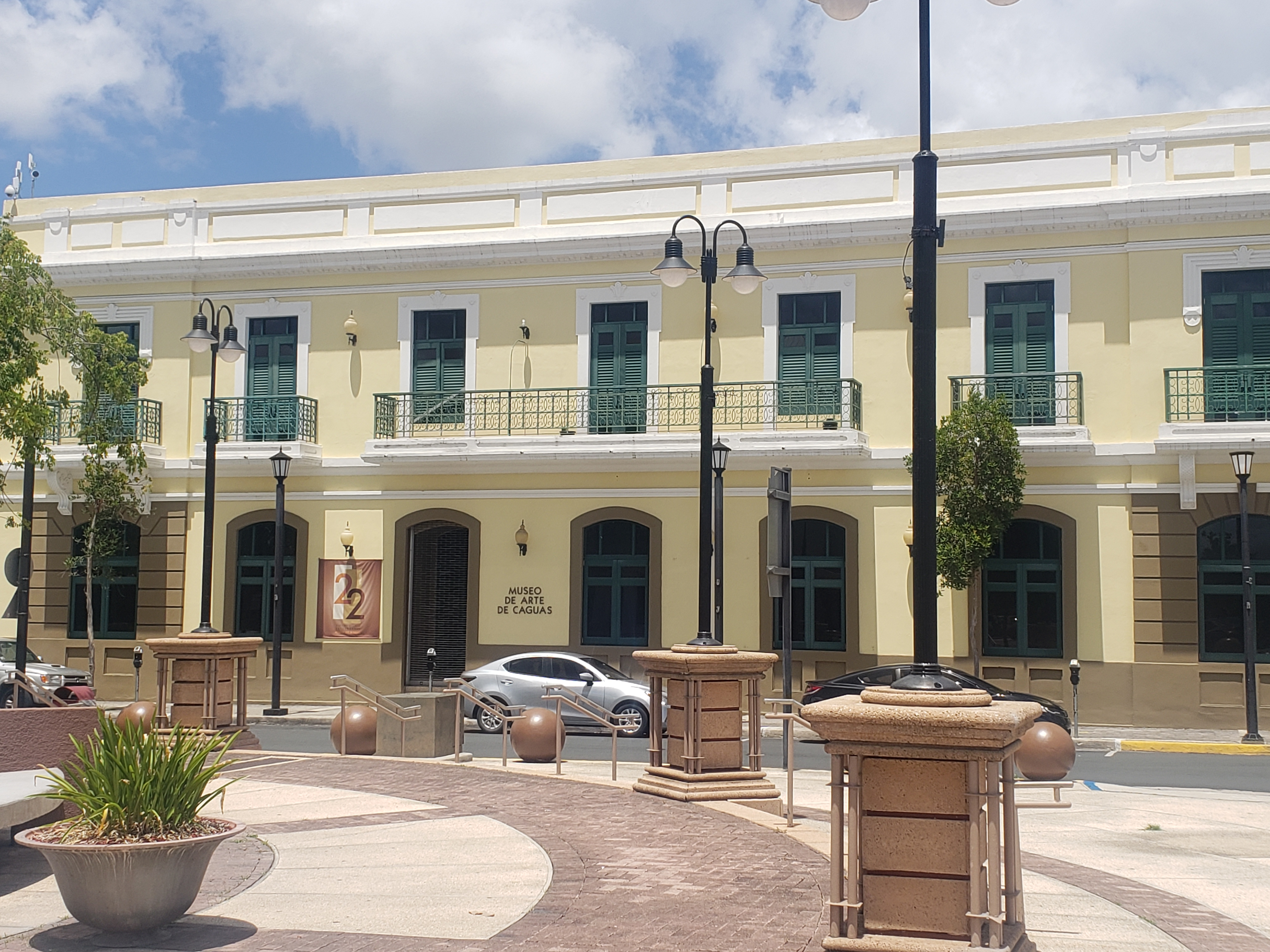
Caguas Museum of Art

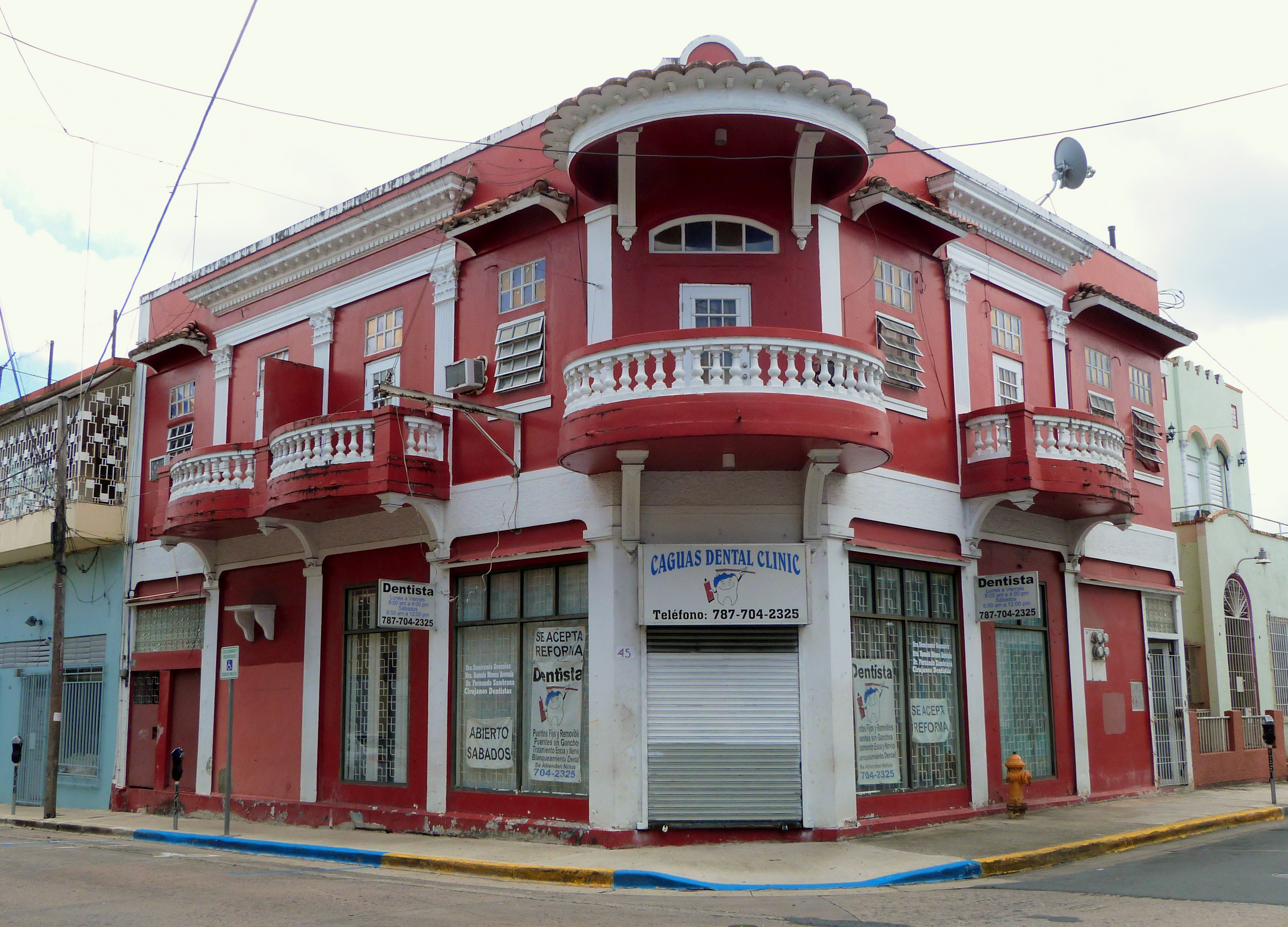
Typical architecture

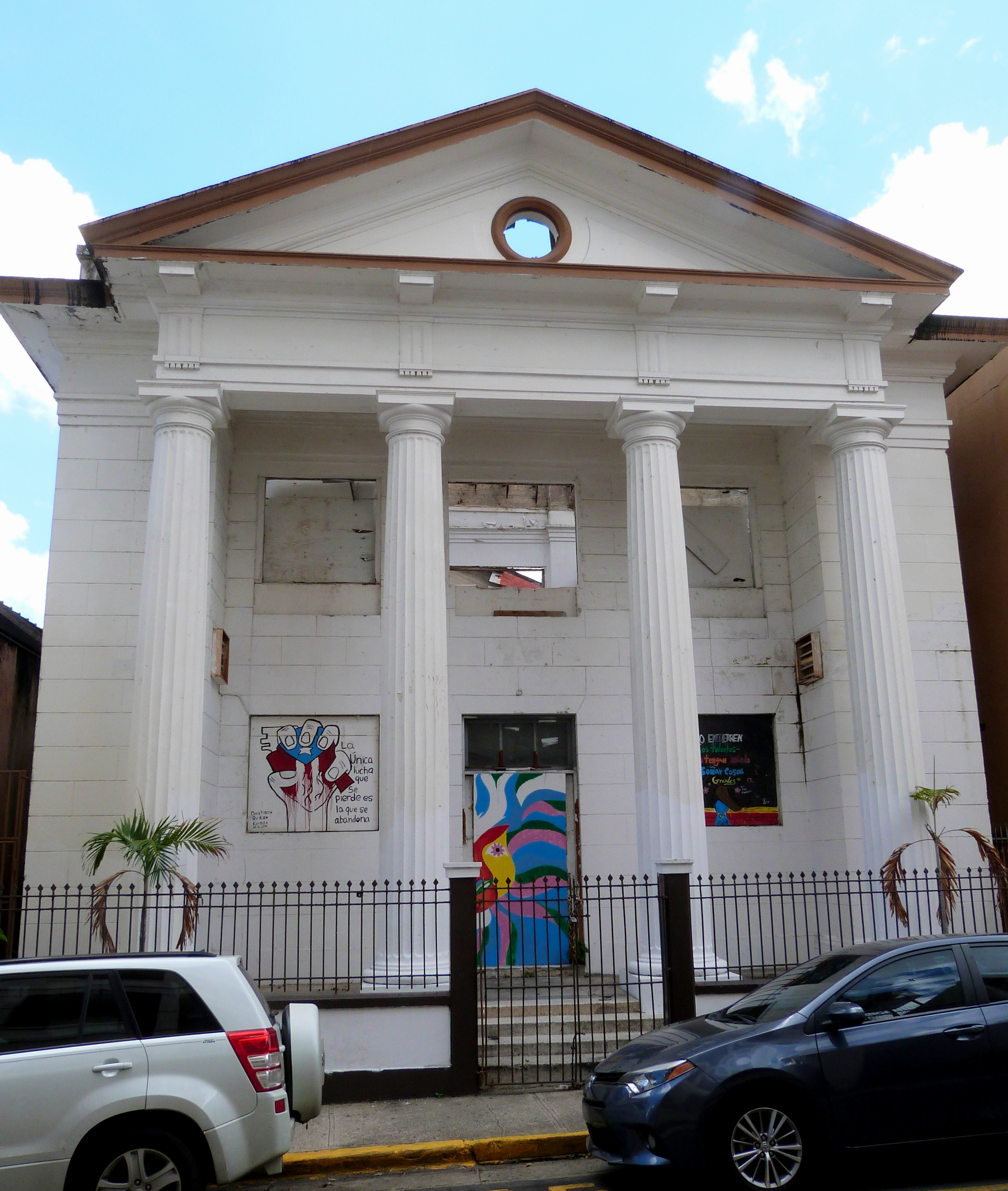
Historic masonic lodge

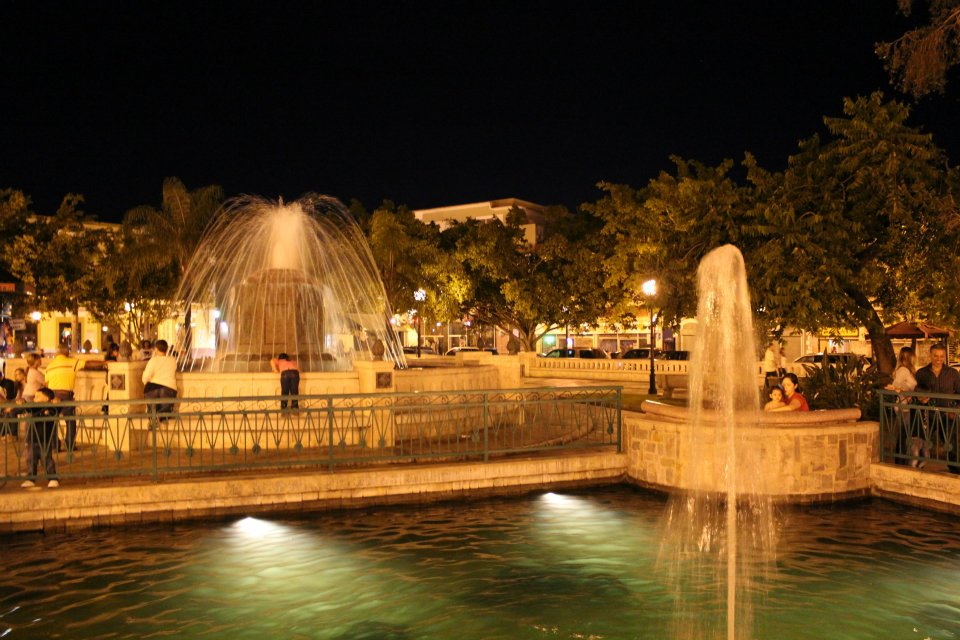
Fountain in Plaza Palmer.

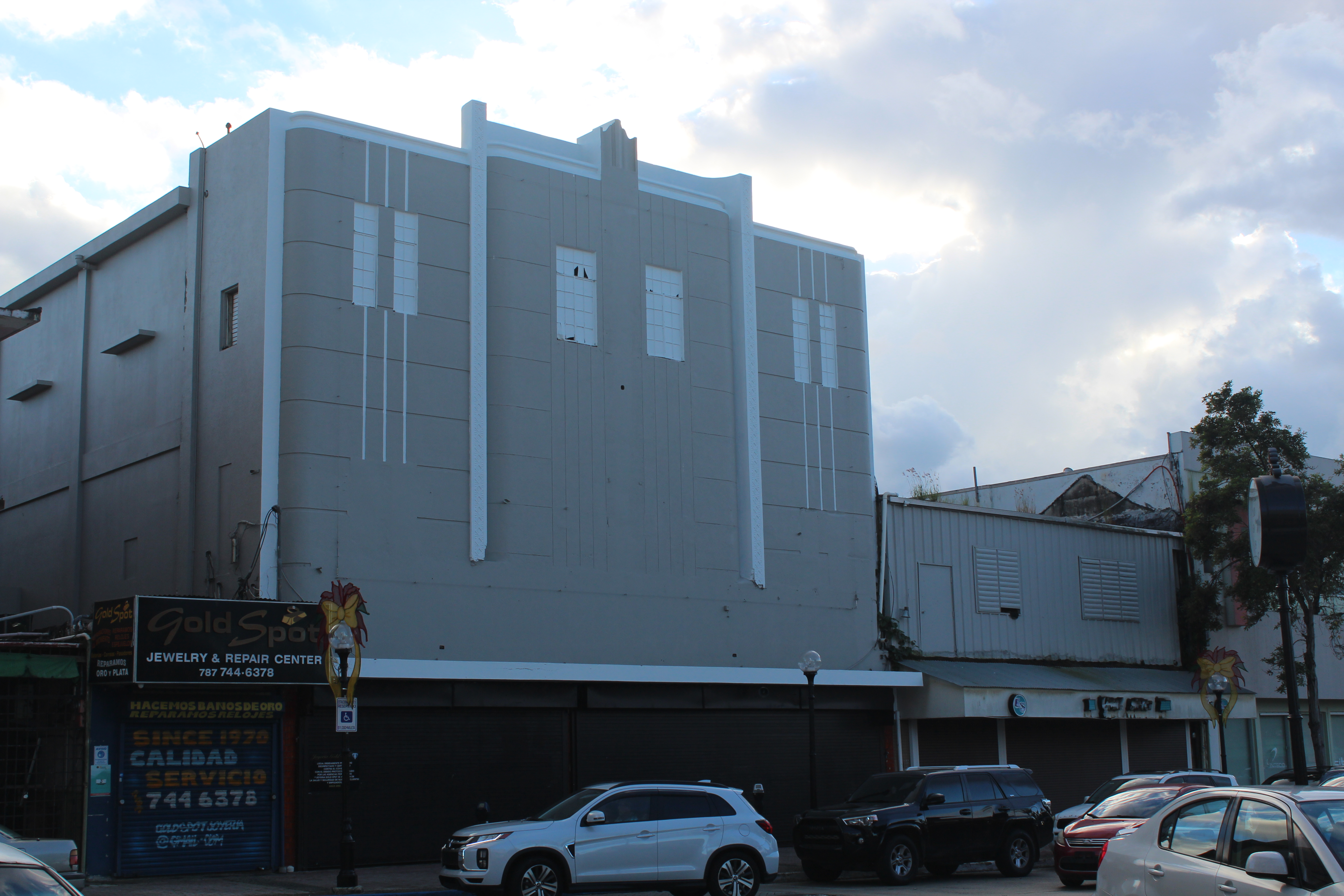
Old Caguas theater.

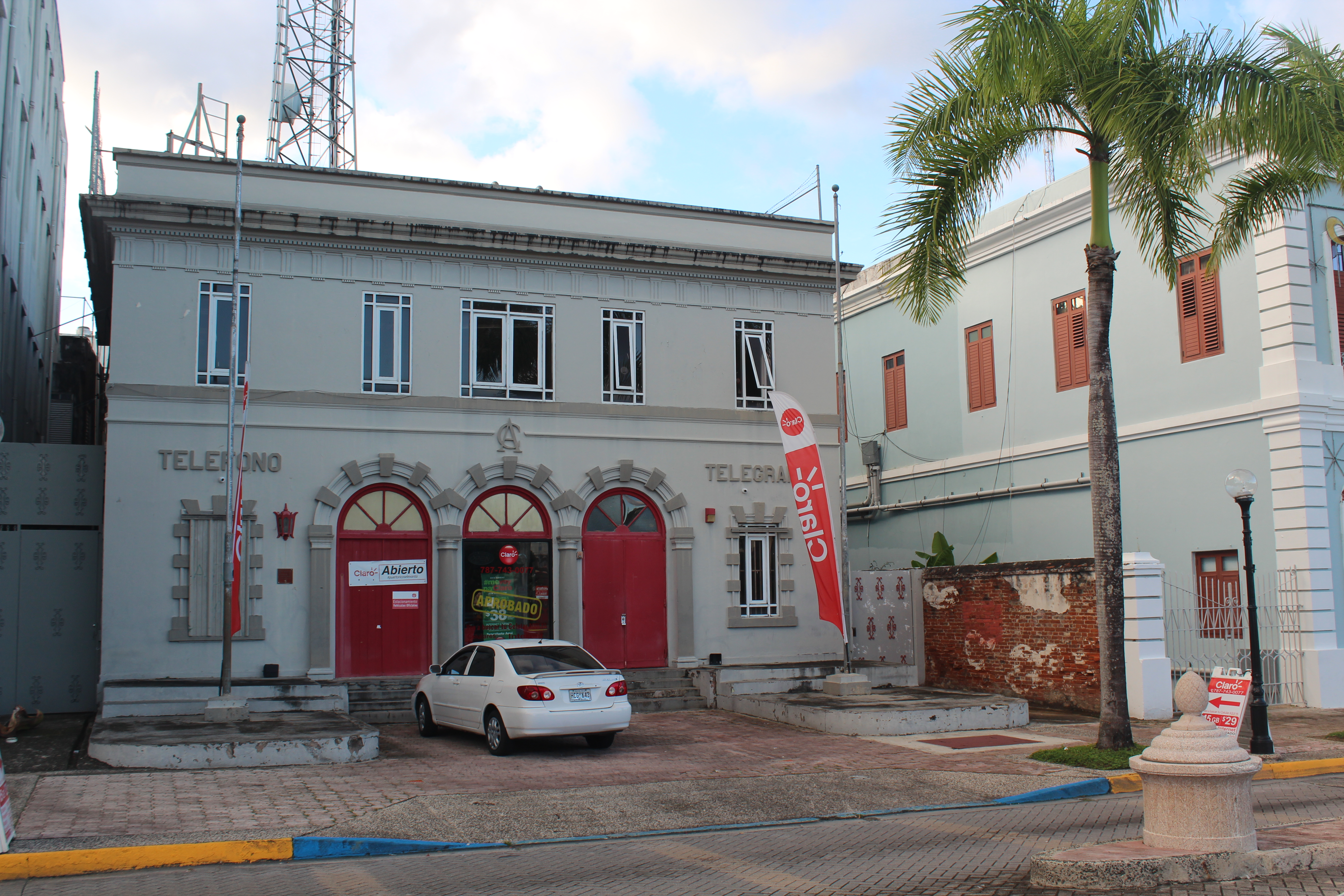
The old Telegraph building of Caguas.

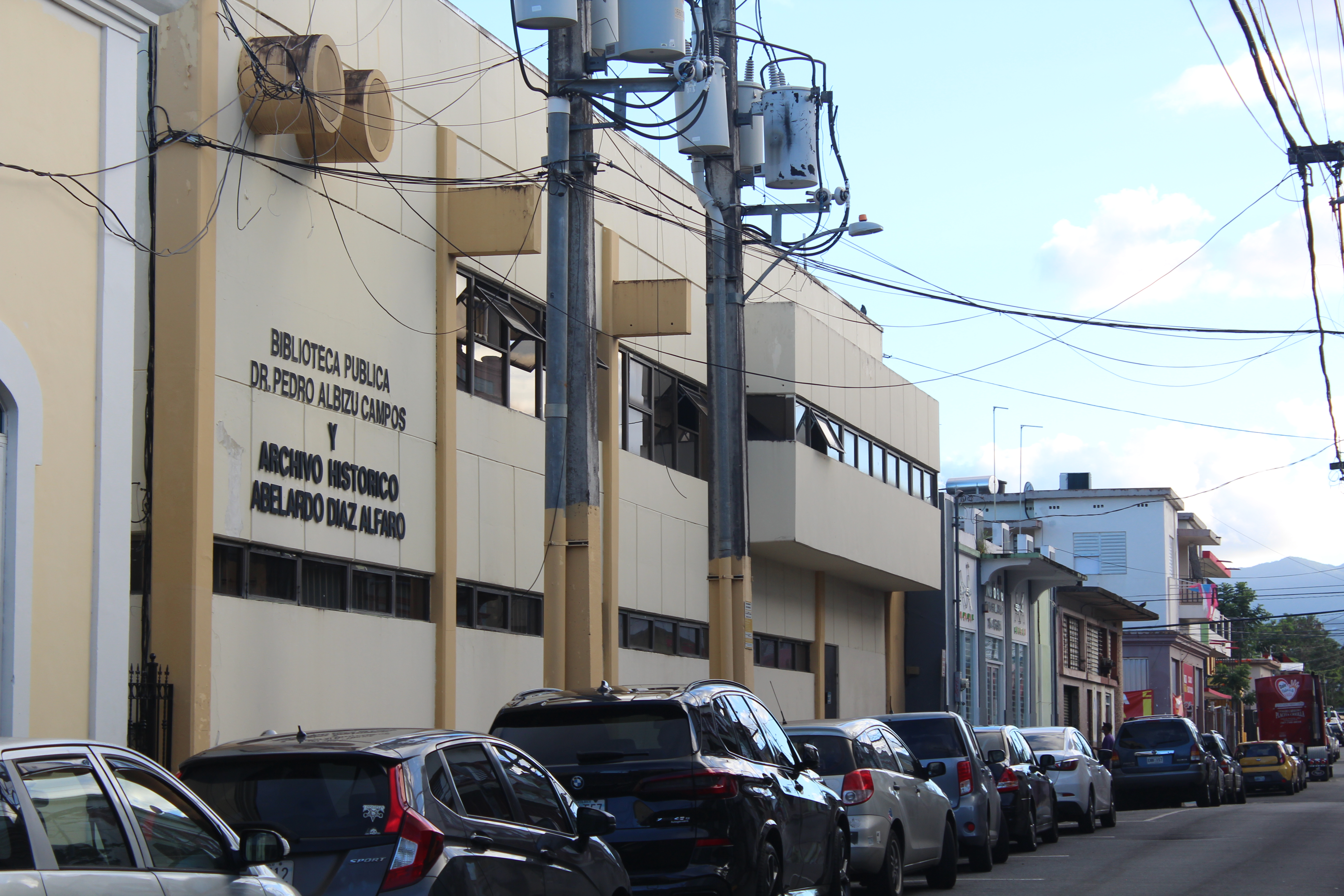
Dr. Pedro Albizu Campos Public Library and Caguas Historical Archives

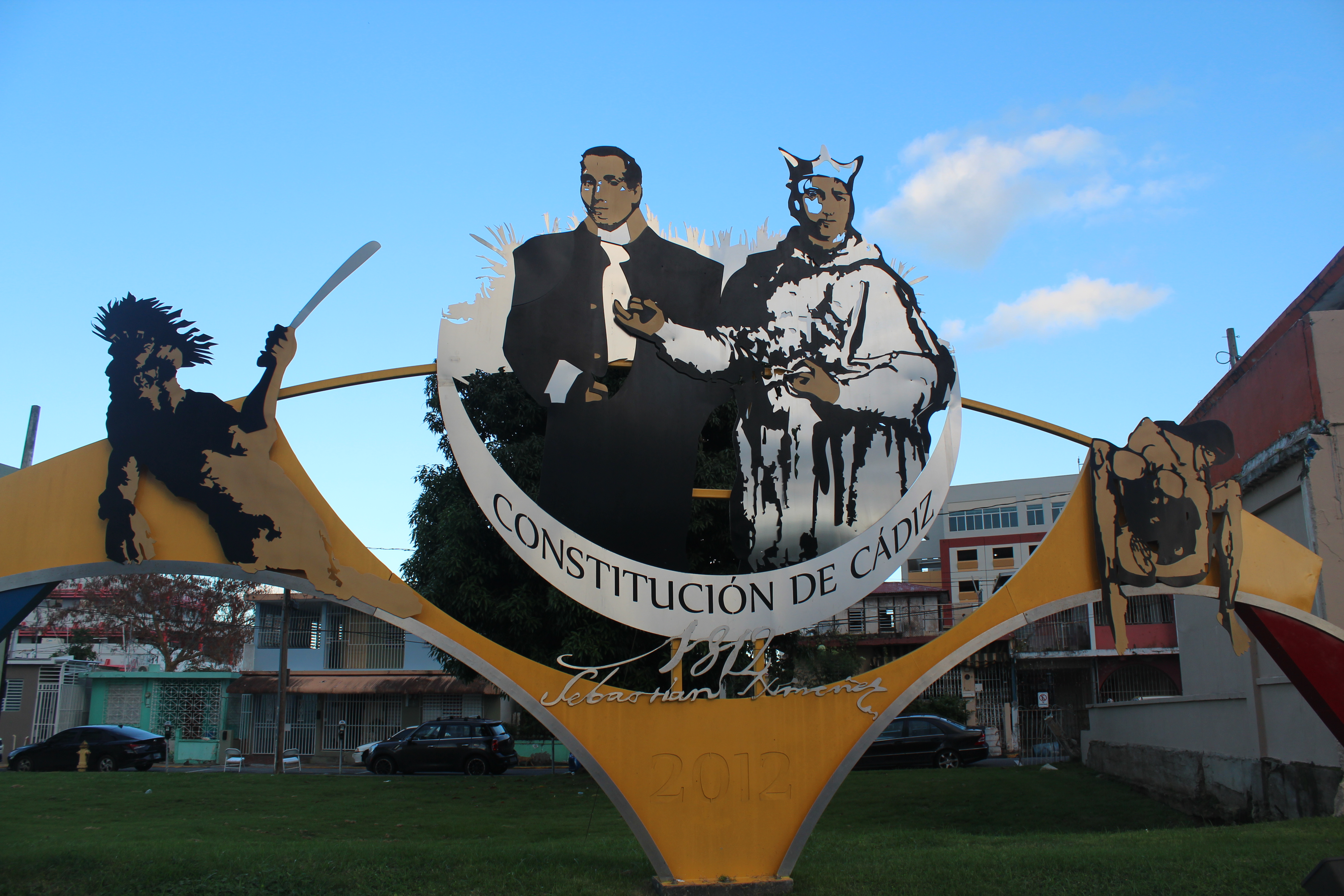
Monument to the Cadiz Constitution

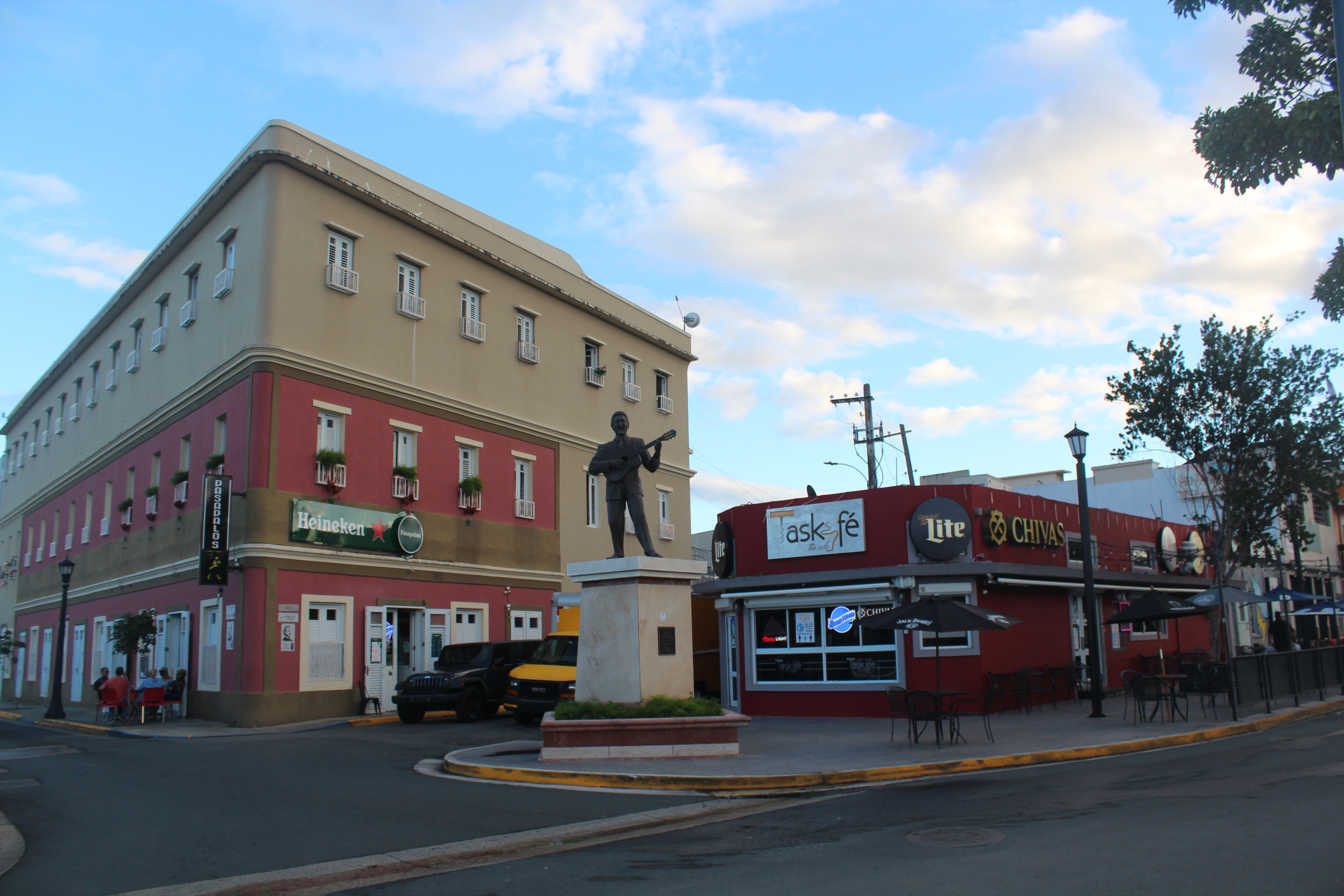
Padial Street

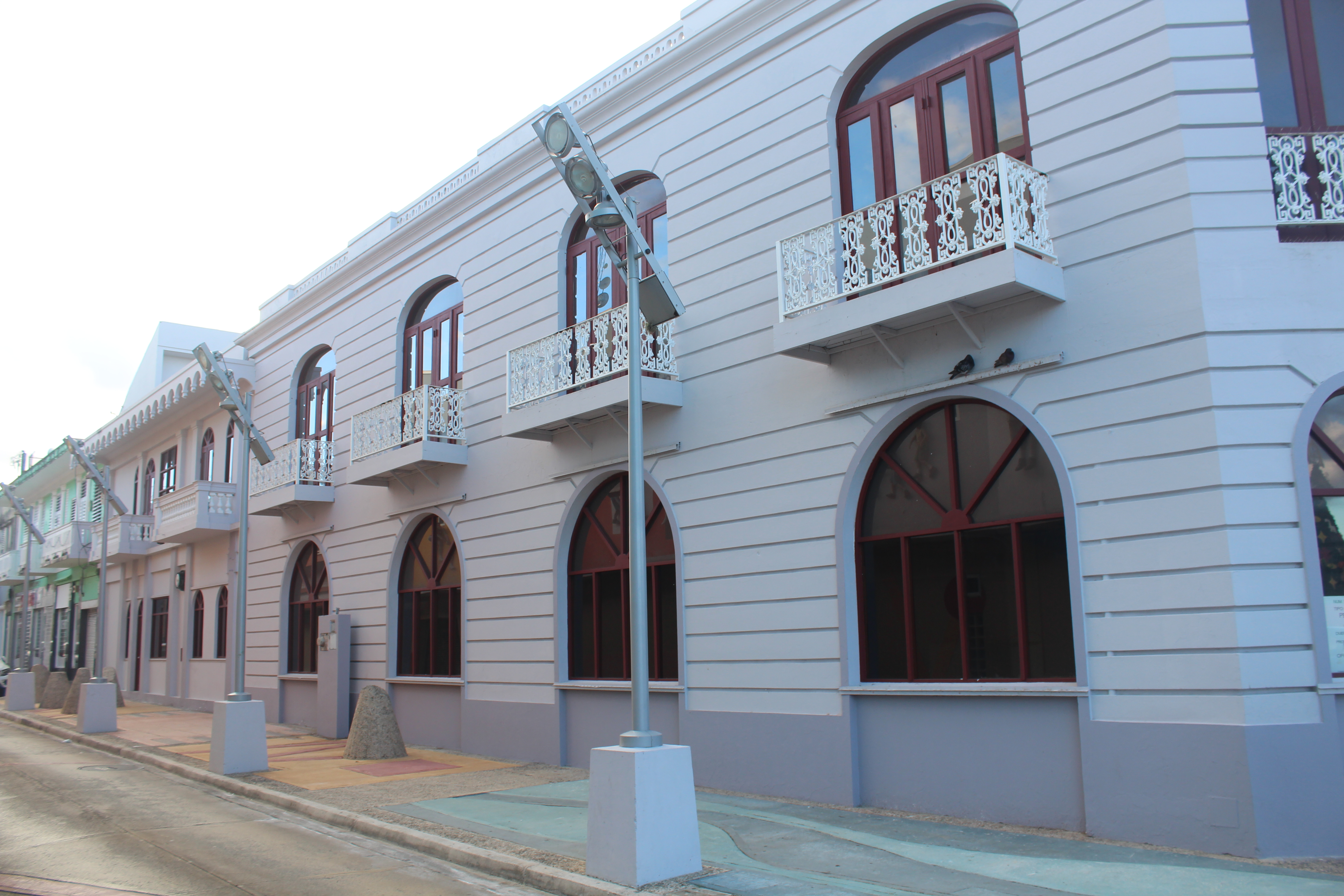
Historic bank building in Plaza Palmer

== See also ==
- List of communities in Puerto Rico
