= Paseo Gautier Benítez =

Street in Caguas, Puerto Rico

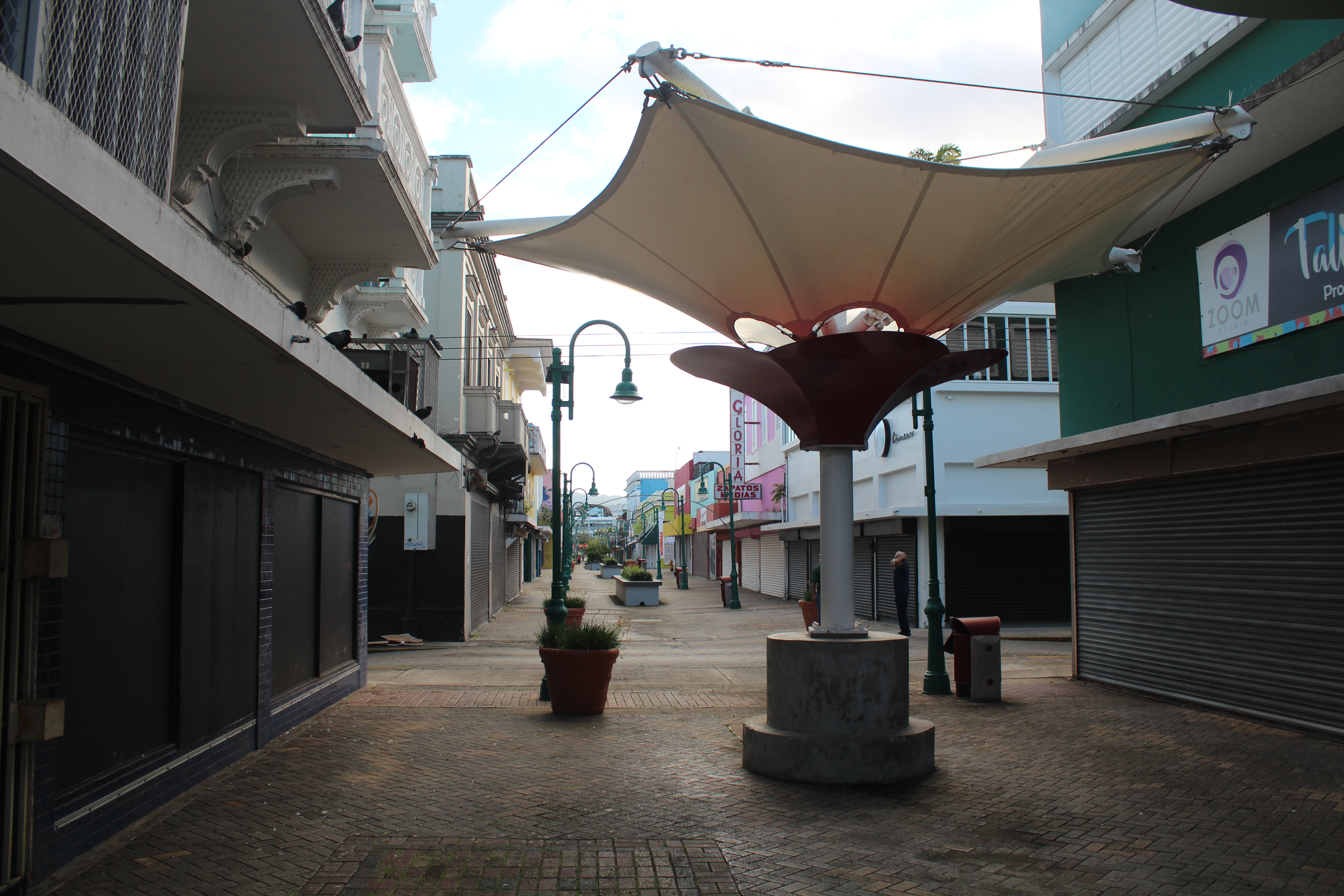
Paseo Gautier

Paseo Gautier Benítez, colloquially known as Paseo Gautier, is a pedestrian street and shopping district located in Caguas Pueblo (downtown Caguas) in the municipality of Caguas, Puerto Rico. The street is named after José Gautier Benítez, a poet from the Romantic Era who was born in Caguas in 1851.

The pedestrianized street extends from Plaza Palmer and Betances Street close to the Caguas Cathedral up to Georgetti Street. The street has commercial establishments, souvenir stores, restaurants and bars. The Paseo Gautier hosts the Fiestas del Paseo Gautier the first Saturday of every month. This monthly event accommodates live music, arts and crafts and food trucks.
