= Centro de Bellas Artes de Caguas =

Performing arts venue located in Caguas, Puerto Rico

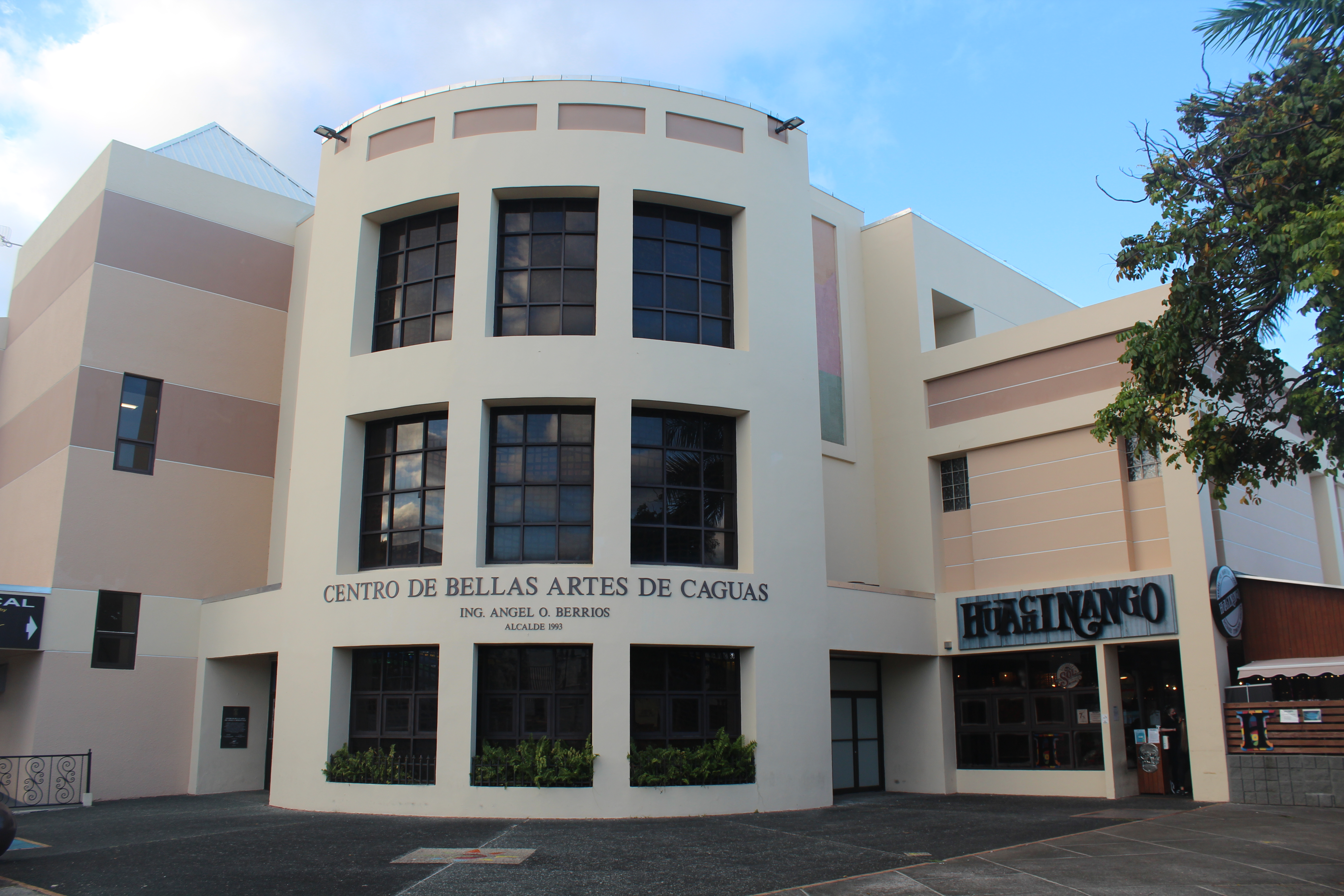
Southeastern entrance of the complex.

The Centro de Bellas Artes de Caguas (English: Caguas Center of Fine Arts), officially the Centro de Bellas Artes Ángel O. Berríos (Ángel O. Berríos Performing Arts Center), is a multi-purpose performance center located on Ruiz Belviz and Luis Padial streets in Caguas Pueblo (downtown Caguas). It was inaugurated in 1993 and named after Ángel O. Berríos, former mayor of Caguas, Puerto Rico. The performing arts center is one of the largest of its kind in Puerto Rico and the Caribbean. The complex is divided into three arts venues: the Felipe Rodríguez Concert Hall, the José Luis Moneró Room, and the Carmita Jiménez Convention Room. The complex is also home to several restaurants and cafés, and has further capacity for conventions, meetings and miscellaneous activities such as school ceremonies, proms and business events.

The Caguas Center of Fine Arts is located in a commercial and entertainment district of downtown Caguas, close to the main town square (Plaza Palmer), several museums such as the Caguas Museum of Art, and both the old and new municipal city halls. The complex is connected to the Caguas City Hall through a promenade called Paseo de las Artes Abelardo Díaz Alfaro ("Promenade of the Arts"). The district is also home to several popular restaurants and bars.

Myraida Chaves was the center's director until her death during 2021; since, Ivonne Class has been the director.

== Gallery ==
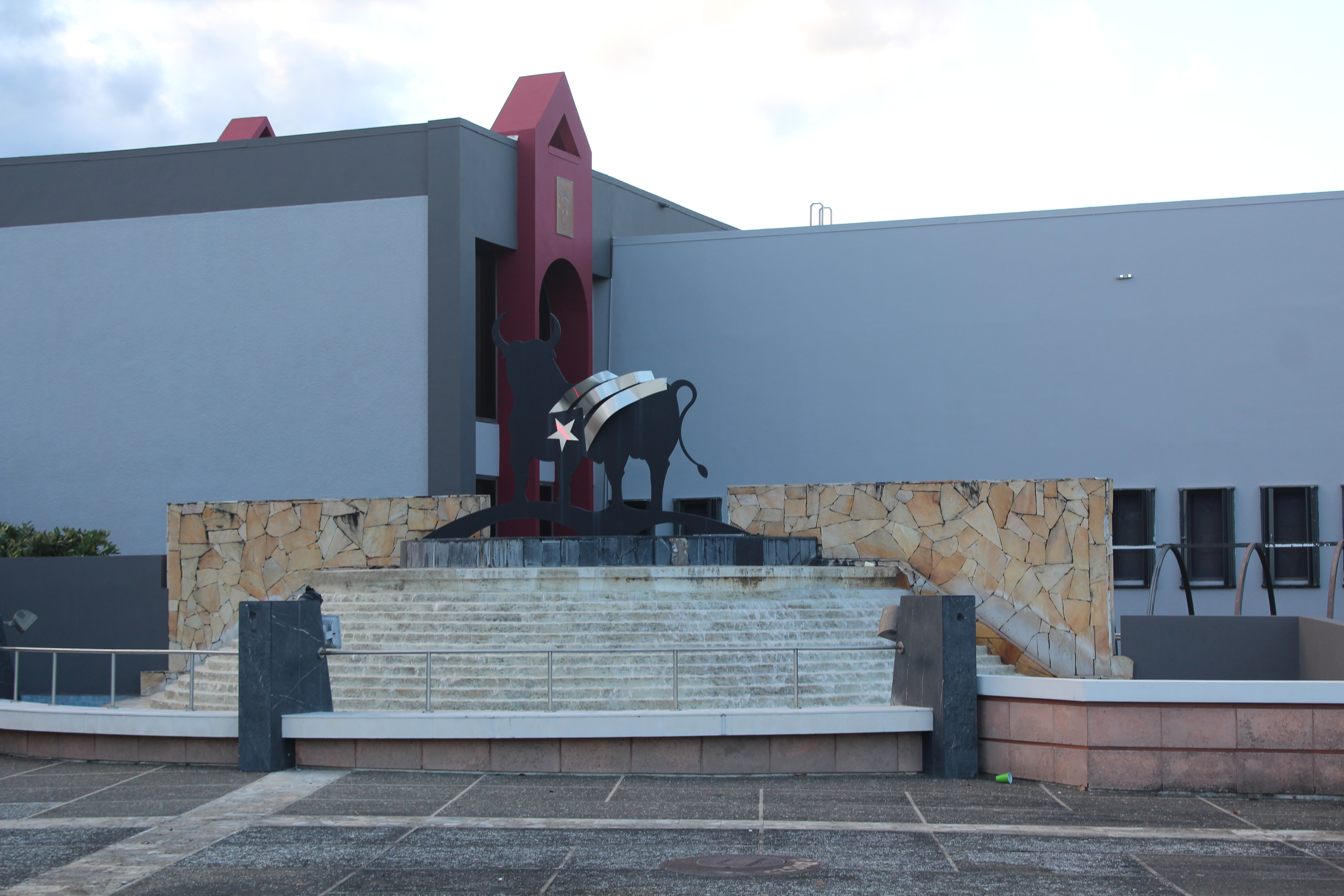
Sculpture on Paseo de las Artes.

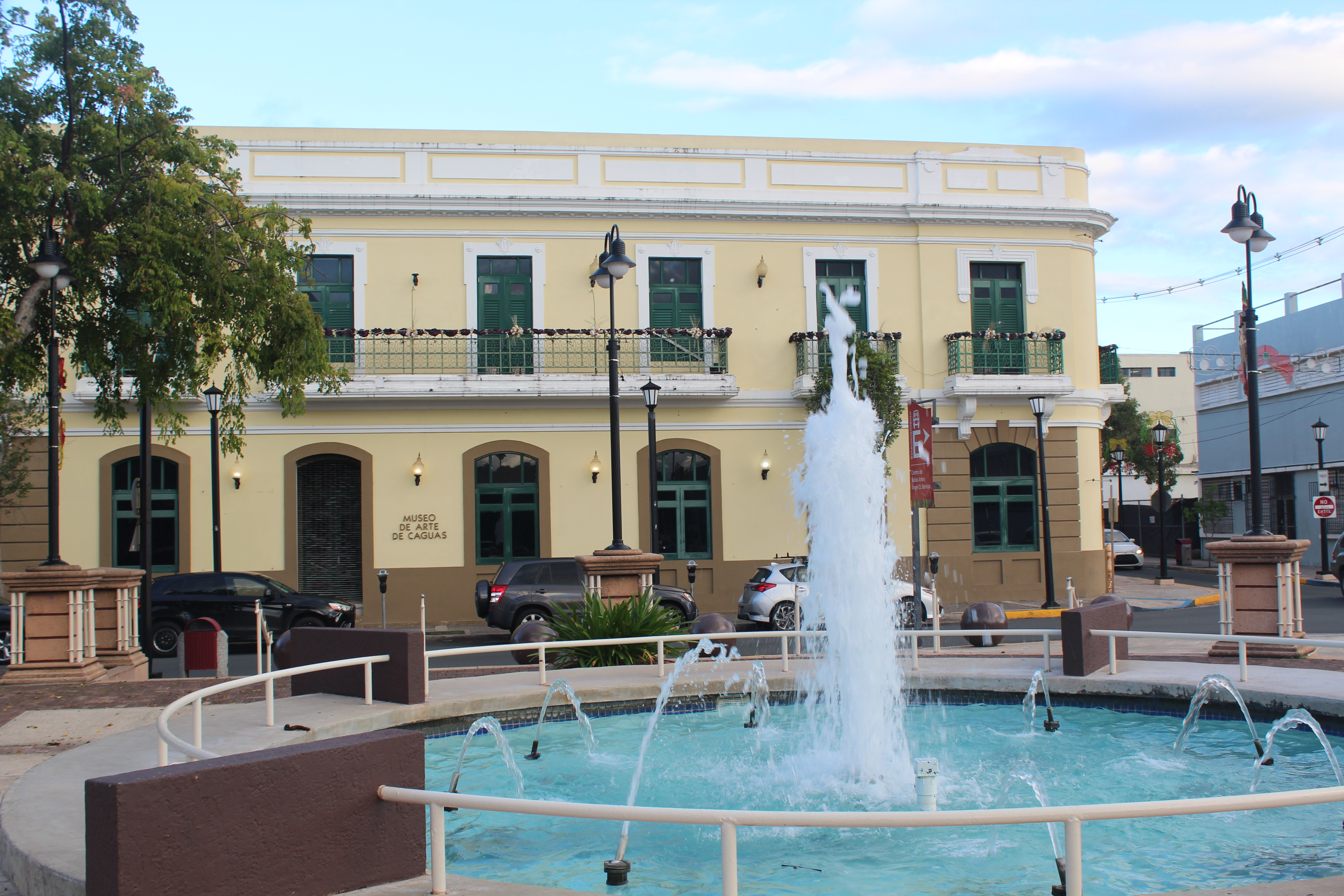
Caguas Museum of Art across the Paseo de las Artes.

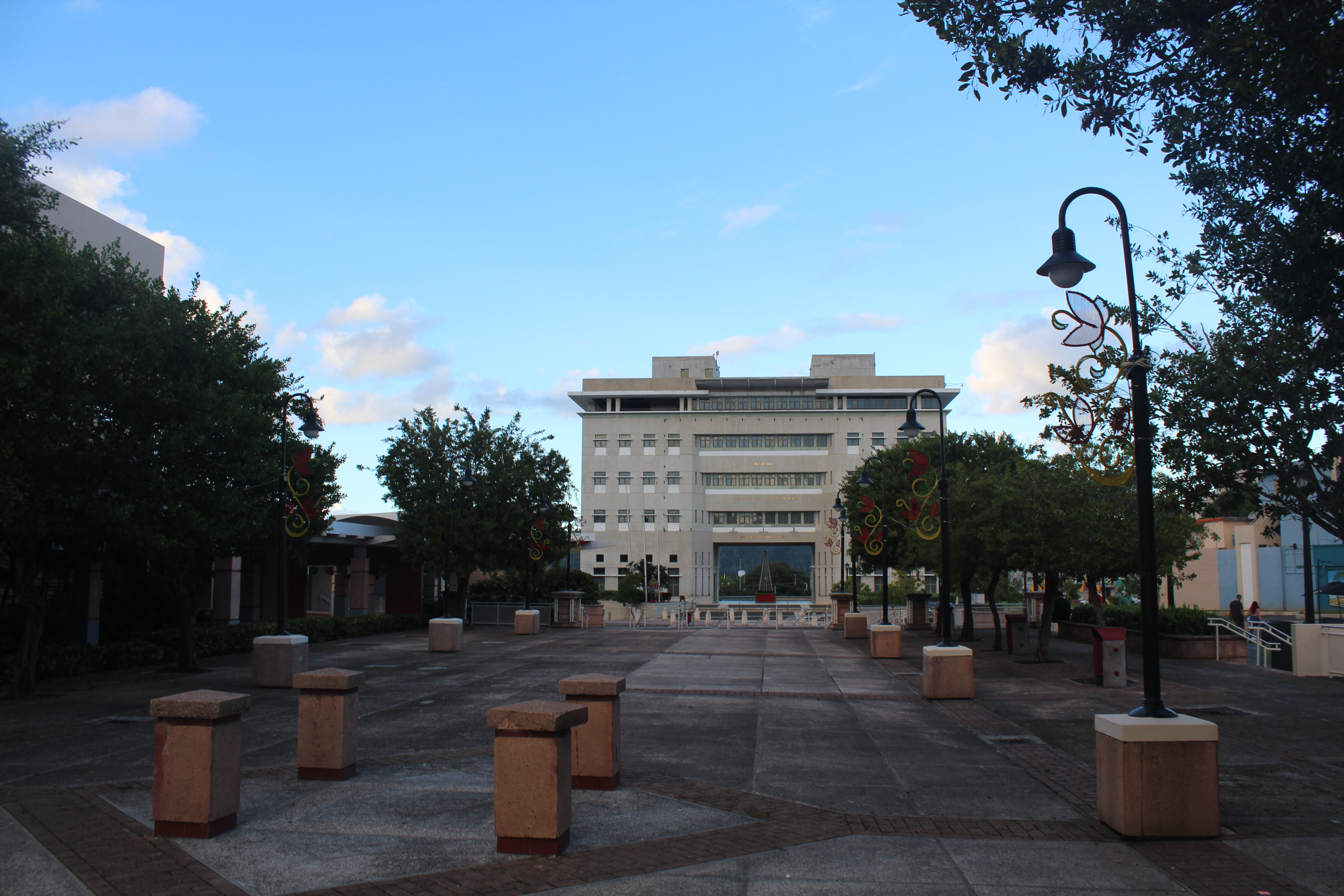
The new Caguas City Hall across Paseo de las Artes.
