= Caguas Museum of Folk Arts =

Museum in Puerto Rico

Coordinates: 18°14′04″N 66°02′12″W

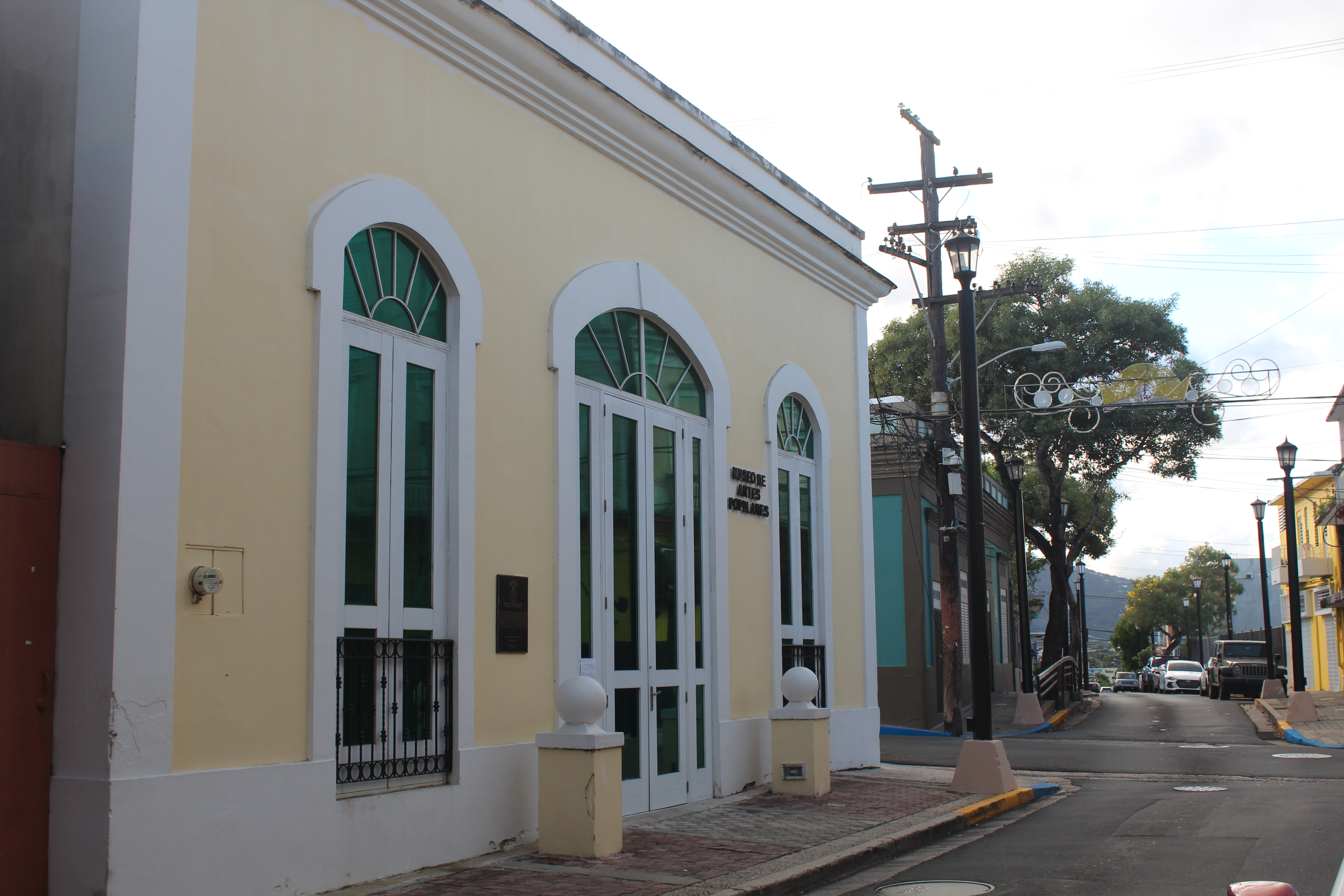
View of the museum from Betances Street.

The Caguas Museum of Folk Arts (Spanish: Museo de Artes Populares de Caguas) is an art museum located in Caguas Pueblo, the downtown and administrative area of the municipality of Caguas, Puerto Rico.

The museum is dedicated to Puerto Rican and Criollo artists, traditional handmade products, and local arts and crafts. The museum is divided into two areas: the first area is a permanent exhibition that showcases Puerto Rican master craftsmen and artists such as Zoilo Cajigas, Celestino Avilés, and Domingo Orta. The second area has a selective sample of eight miniature pieces by Caguas master artisan, Edwin Báez, as well as quarterly temporary exhibitions.

== See also ==
- Caguas Museum of Art
- Puerto Rican art
