= Caguas Museum of History =

Museum in Puerto Rico

Coordinates: 18.2348°N 66.0360°W

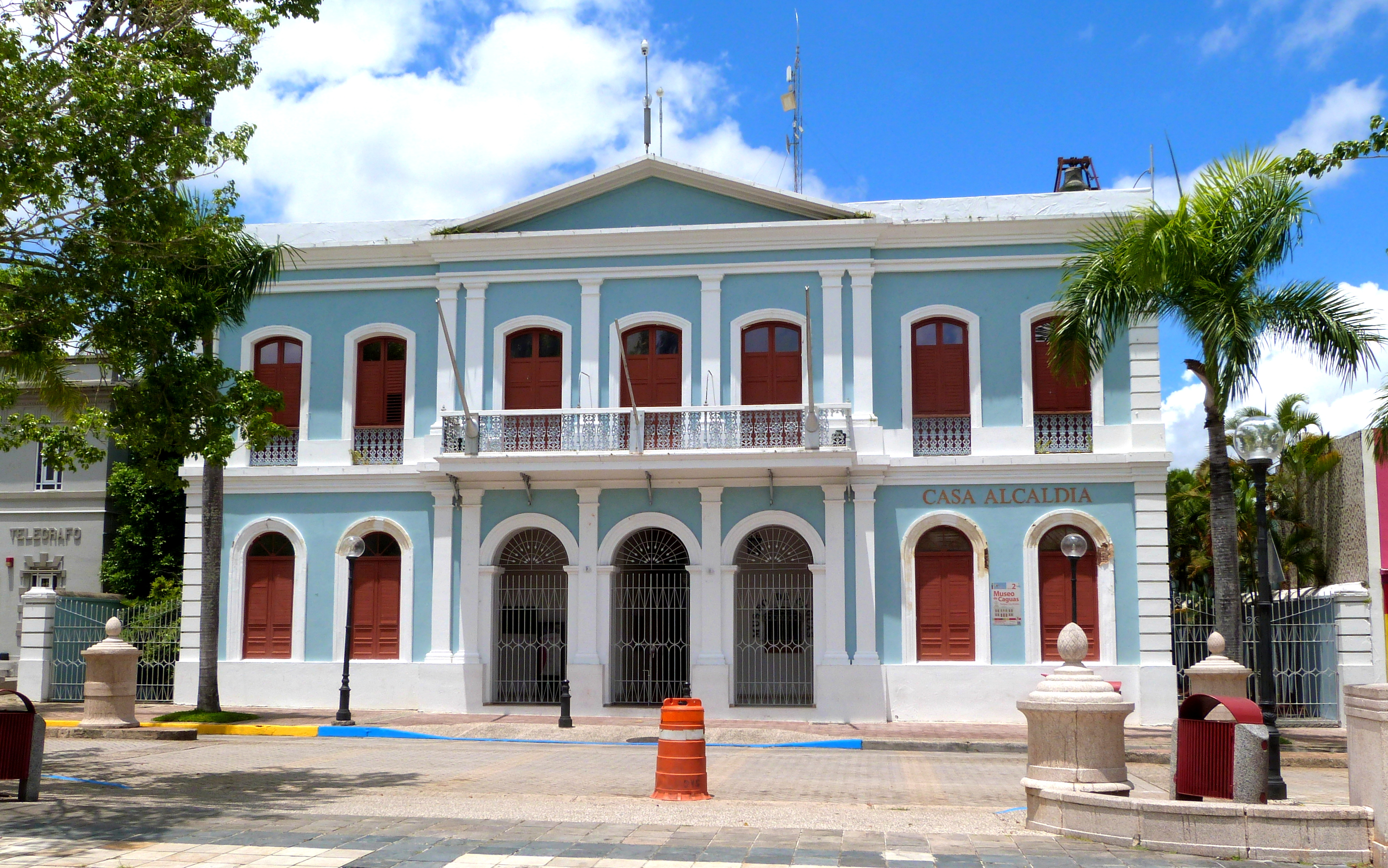
The museum is located in the old Caguas City Hall building.

The Caguas Museum of History (Spanish: Museo de Historia de Caguas, also often referred to as Museo de Caguas) is a history museum located in the old city hall of the municipality of Caguas, Puerto Rico. This building is located on Muñoz Rivera Street on the western edge of Plaza Palmer, the main town square. Caguas Pueblo, which is the historic and administrative center of the municipality.

The museum consists of five exhibitions each dedicated to either a historical era or a particular aspect of the Puerto Rican and local Criollo identity and history. The term Criollo, outside of its historical connotations, is often used to describe natives and residents of the city of Caguas regardless of race or ethnicity. The term comes from one of the city's nicknames: la Ciudad Criolla ('Criollo city'), which also lends the term to numerous local sports teams.

== See also ==
- Caguas, Puerto Rico
- History of Caguas, Puerto Rico
