= Logia Unión y Amparo No. 44 =

Masonic lodge located in Caguas, Puerto Rico

- U.S. National Register of Historic Places
- Puerto Rico Historic Sites and Zones
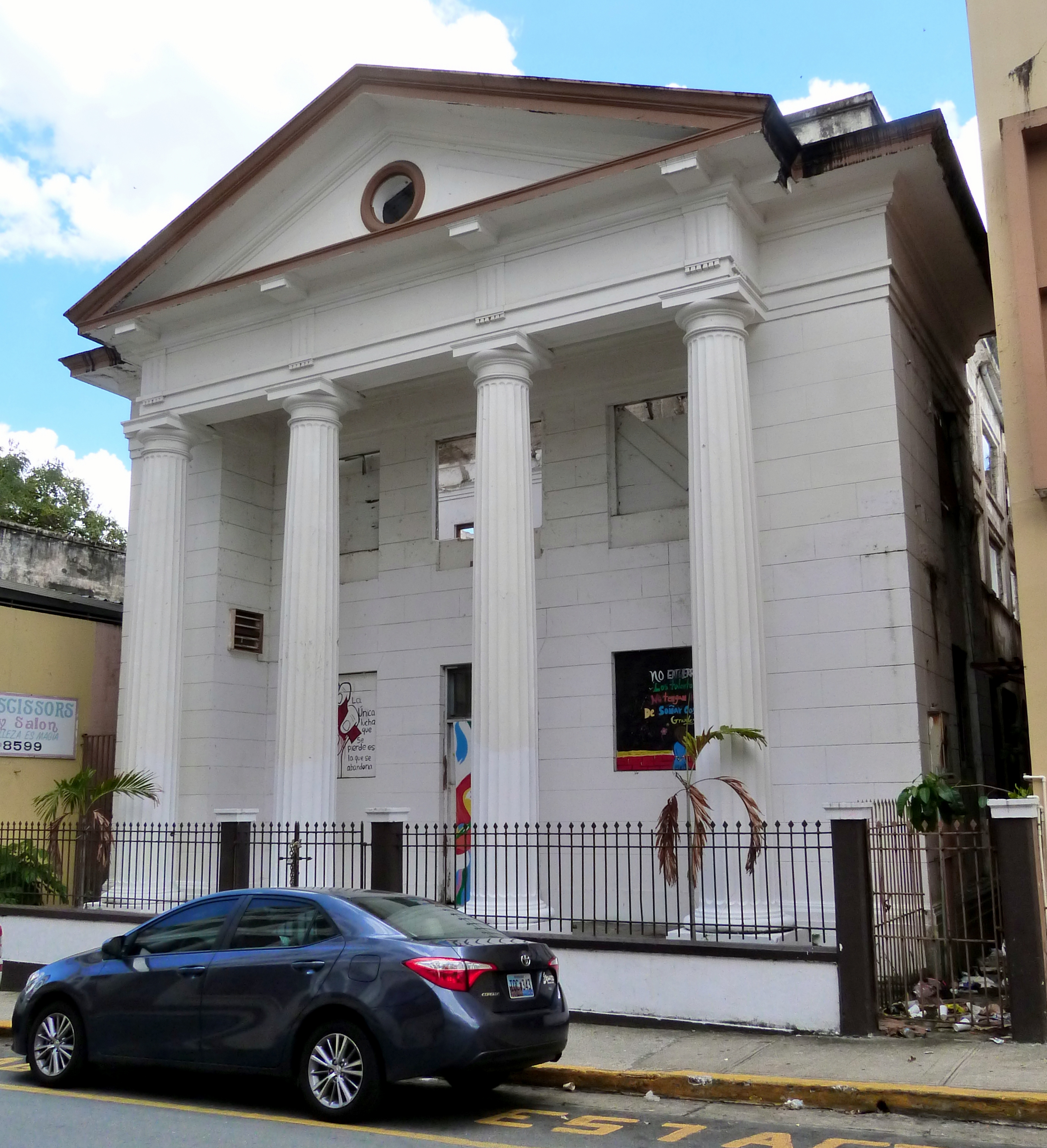
- Logia Unión y Amparo No. 44, in 2017

- Location within Puerto Rico
- Location: Calle Acosta No. 39, Caguas, Puerto Rico 00725
- Coordinates: 18°14′09″N 66°02′04″W
- Area: less than one acre
- Built: 1923
- Architect: Antonin Nechodoma
- Architectural style: Classical Revival
- NRHP reference No.: 88000661
- RNSZH No.: 2000-(RCE)-21-JP-SH

Significant dates
- Added to NRHP: June 15, 1988
- Designated RNSZH: December 21, 2000

The Logia Unión y Ampara No. 44, or Logia Masónica de Caguas is a masonic lodge located in Caguas, Puerto Rico which was built in 1923. It was listed on the National Register of Historic Places on June 15, 1988 and on the Puerto Rico Register of Historic Sites and Zones in 2000.

== History and description ==
According to historians of freemasonry, somewhere between 1873 and 1875 the Logia Ampara had a member named Jose Ramos de Anaya who went on to serve as Grand Master from 1903 to 1904 in Puerto Rico.

The privately owned lodge, designed by Antonin Nechodoma, was listed in the National Register of Historic Places on June 15, 1988. The lodge features a Greek Revival architecture style and is made of concrete. As of June 15, 1988 it still maintained its function as a meeting place for freemasons.

== Gallery ==
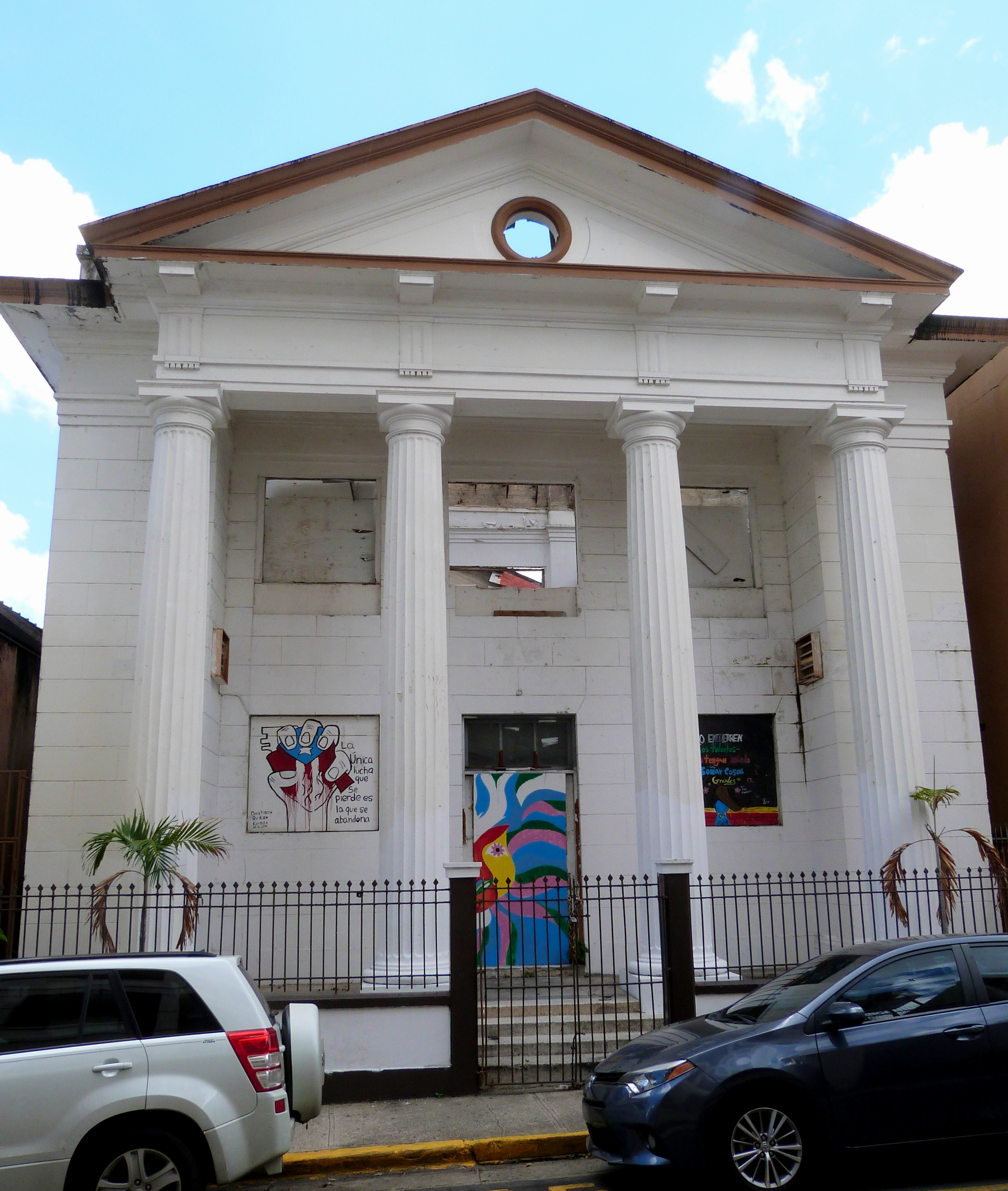
Facade of Logia Union y Amparo No. 44 in April, 2017 with boarded up windows
