= Caguas City Hall =

Government buildings in Caguas, Puerto Rico

The Caguas City Hall (Spanish: Casa de la Alcaldía de Caguas) consists of two buildings located in the downtown area of Caguas, Puerto Rico.

== The old city hall ==
- Alcaldia de Caguas
- U.S. National Register of Historic Places
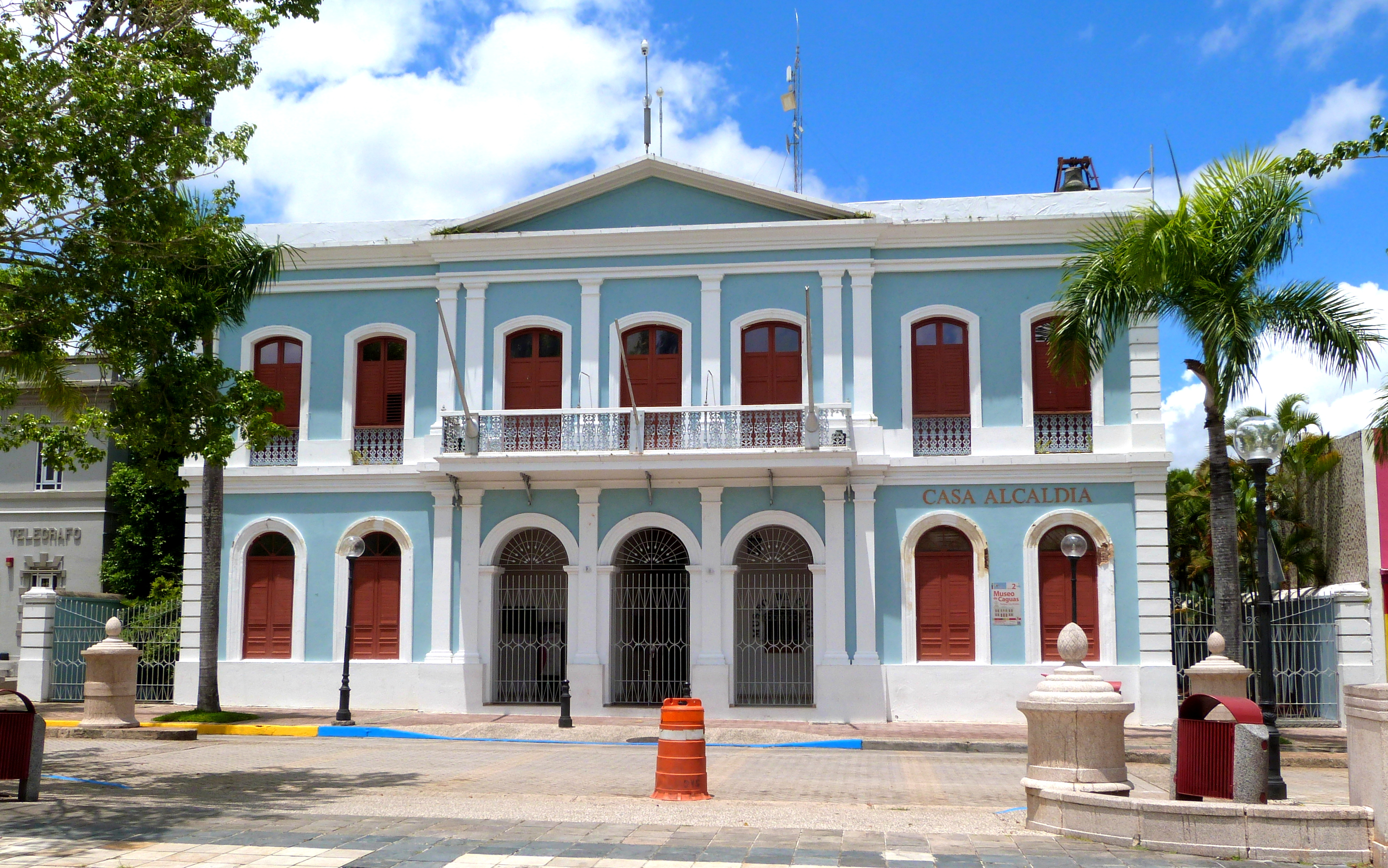
- Old Caguas city hall building

- Location within Puerto Rico
- Location: Calle Muñoz Rivera Num. 42, Caguas, Puerto Rico
- Coordinates: 18°14′12″N 66°02′11″W
- Area: Less than one acre
- Built: 1856
- Built by: Spanish Royal Corps of Engineers
- Architect: Spanish Royal Corps of Engineers
- Architectural style: Isabelino Neoclassical
- NRHP reference No.: 88001307
- Added to NRHP: March 22, 1989

The original city hall building (Spanish: Antigua Casa Alcaldía) of the municipality of Caguas dates to 1856-1860, although it did not officially become the municipal headquarters until 1887. The building is well-maintained and still preserves its original Neoclassical façade. The building was added to the National Register of Historic Places as Alcaldia de Caguas on March 22, 1989. This building hosted municipal offices until 2010 when the new city hall building was inaugurated. The building now houses several cultural institutions including a museum dedicated to the history of Caguas.

== The new city hall ==
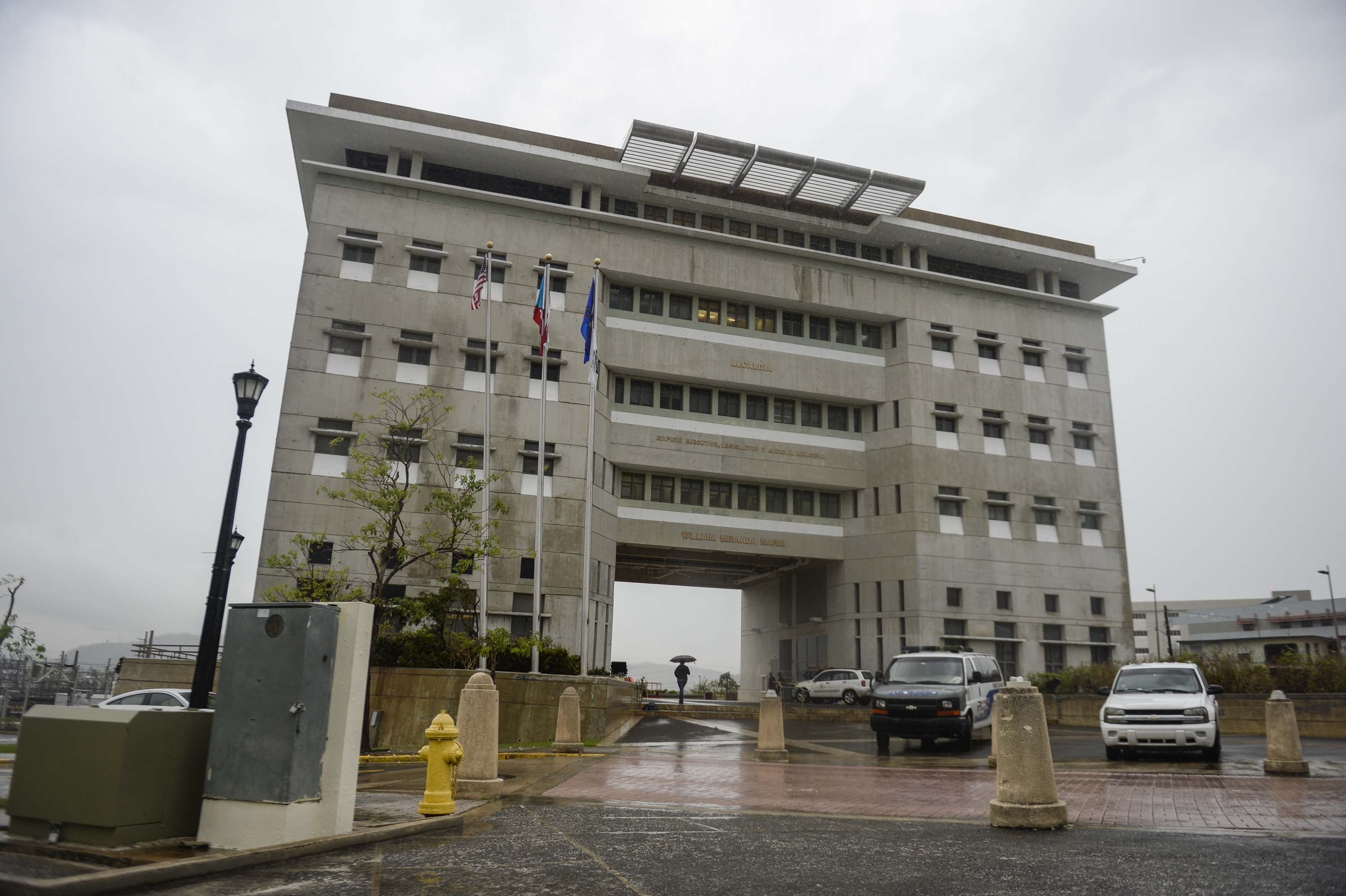
The new city hall building in 2017.

The building of a new city hall was part of a project to develop and build more modern office and administrative spaces in the city. Some people, however, have criticized the continuous use of Brutalist architecture in new government buildings. The new city hall building, nicknamed "El Cacique Mayor" (Spanish for 'the major cacique'), was inaugurated in September 2010 by Caguas mayor William Edgardo Miranda Torres.

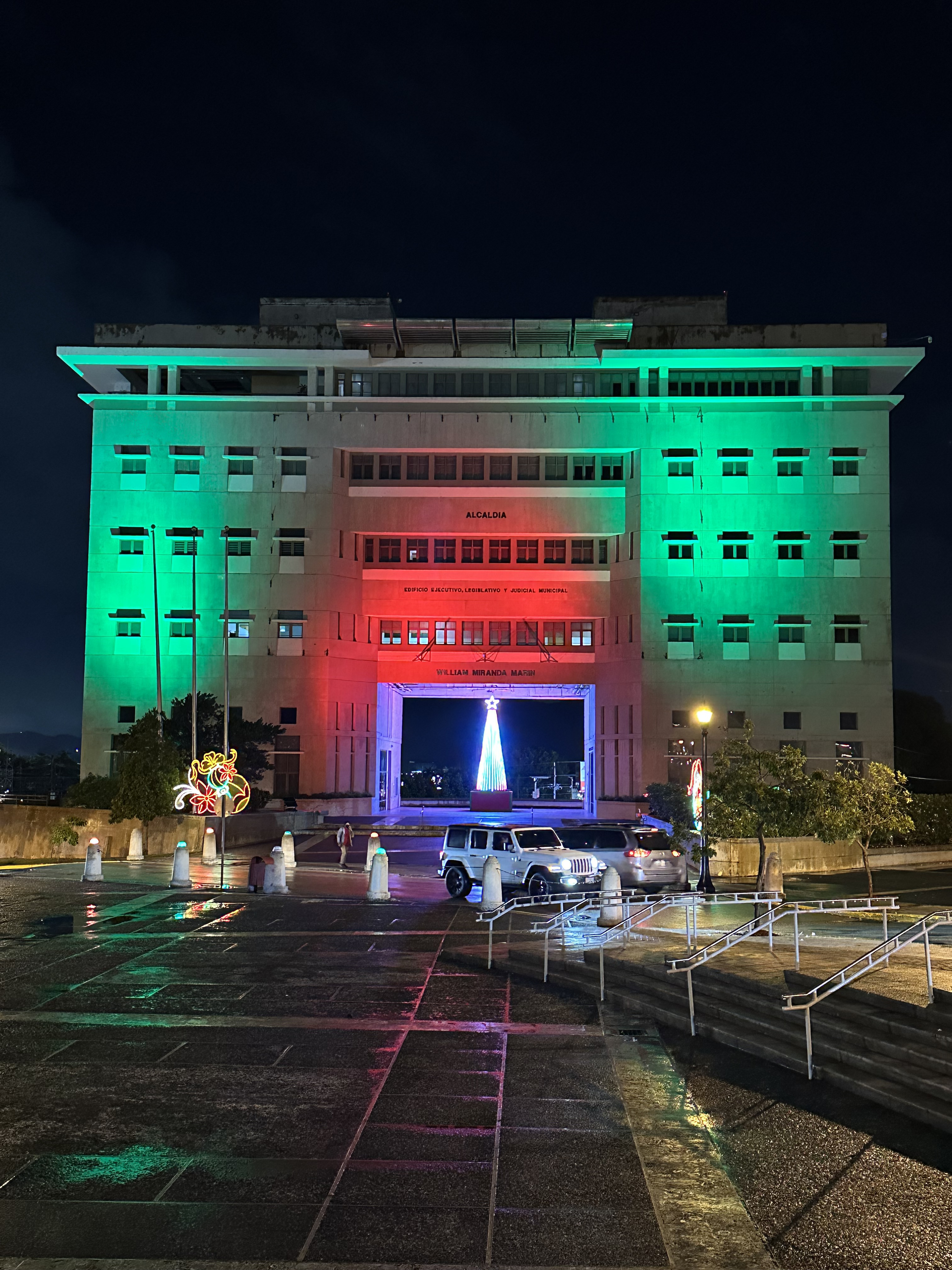
Caguas city hall at night

== See also ==
- Architecture of Puerto Rico
- Caguas, Puerto Rico
- Caguas Museum of History
